= Mother of Pearl and Silver: The Andalusian =

Painting by James Abbott McNeill Whistler

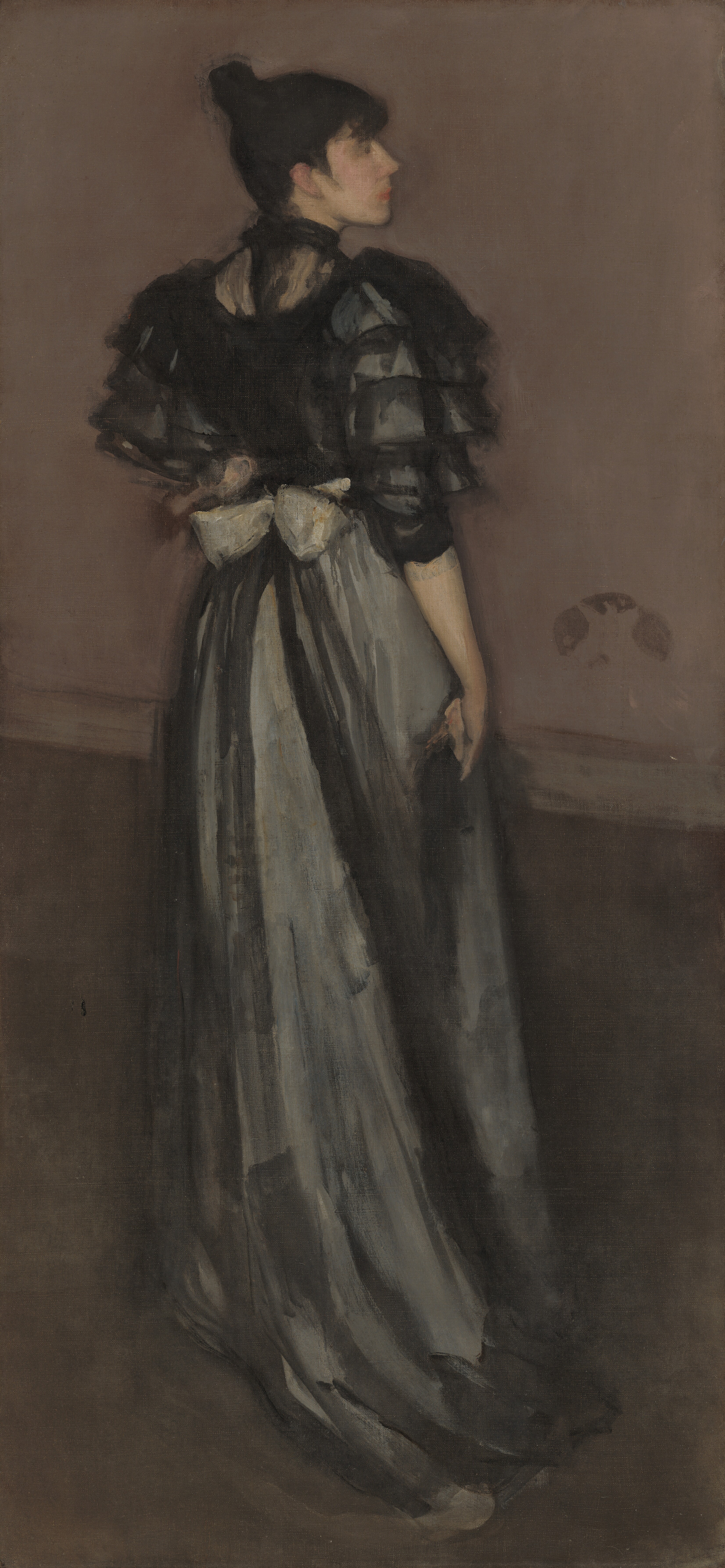
- Artist: James McNeill Whistler
- Year: 1888?–1900
- Medium: Oil on canvas
- Dimensions: 191.5 cm × 89.8 cm (75.4 in × 35.4 in)
- Location: National Gallery of Art; Washington, D.C.

Mother of Pearl and Silver: The Andalusian is a painting by James McNeill Whistler. The work shows a woman in full figure standing with her back to the viewer, with her head in profile. The model is Ethel Whibley, (née Birnie Philip) the artist's secretary and sister-in-law.

The painting's color scheme consists of black, mother-of-pearl, and silver. The title alludes to Ethel's gray silk evening dress, which is styled in the Parisian Belle Époque manner. The transparent, layered sleeves of the black bolero jacket evoke the appearance of a traditional Andalusian costume.

== Artist and model ==
James McNeill Whistler was born in the United States in 1834, the son of George Washington Whistler, a railway engineer. In 1843, his father relocated the family to Saint Petersburg, Russia, where James received training in painting. After a stay in England, he returned to America to attend the US Military Academy at West Point in 1851. In 1855, he made his way back to Europe, determined to dedicate himself to painting. He settled in Paris at first, but in 1859 moved to London, where he would spend most of the remainder of his life. Although he returned to Paris from 1892 to 1901 and resided at 110 Rue du Bac, Paris, with his studio at the top of 86 Rue Notre Dame des Champs.

Ethel Birnie Philip was born at Chelsea, London, on 29 September 1861. She was the daughter of the sculptor John Birnie Philip and Frances Black. Her sister Beatrice (also called "Beatrix" or "Trixie') married Whistler in 1888. Ethel worked for a time in 1893–1894 as secretary to Whistler. She married Charles Whibley in 1896 in the garden of the house occupied by Whistler at Rue du Bac. Her sister Rosalind Birnie Philip succeeded Ethel as Whistler's secretary, and was appointed the artist's executrix at his death.

Whistler painted a number of full-length portraits of Ethel, including Mother of Pearl and Silver: The Andalusian and the watercolour Rose and Silver: Portrait of Mrs Whibley; and other sketches and etchings of her titled as Miss Ethel Philip or Mrs Whibley.

== Creation ==
Whistler commenced work on The Andalusian in London in 1888, the year Whistler married Beatrix, with the painting being completed in Paris in 1900.

== See also ==
- List of paintings by James McNeill Whistler

== Sources ==
- Anderson, Ronald; Anne Koval (1994). James McNeill Whistler: Beyond the Myth. London: John Murray. ISBN 0-7195-5027-0.
- Batchelor, Bob (2002). The 1900s. Westport, Conn.; London: Greenwood Press. ISBN 0-313-31334-2.
- Craven, Wayne (2003). American Art: History and Culture. New York: McGraw-Hill. ISBN 0-07-141524-6.
- Kramer, Hilton; Roger Kimball (1974). The Age of the Avant-Garde: An Art Chronicle of 1956–1972. London: Secker and Warburg. ISBN 0-436-23685-0.
- Young, Andrew McLaren; MacDonald, Margaret F.; Spencer, Robin; Miles, Hamish (1980). The Paintings of James McNeill Whistler. New Haven and London: 2 vols, Yale University Press.
- MacDonald, Margaret F.; Galassi, Susan Grace; Ribeiro, Aileen (2003). Whistler, Women, & Fashion. Frick Collection/Yale University.
- MacDonald, Margaret F. (1999). "Whistler, James (Abbott) McNeill". Grove Art Online. Oxford: Oxford University Press.
- Newton, Joy; Margaret F. MacDonald (1978). "Whistler: Search for a European Reputation". Zeitschrift für Kunstgeschichte. 41 (2): 148–159. doi:10.2307/1481962. JSTOR 1481962.
- Schlossman, Beryl (1999). Objects of Desire: The Madonnas of Modernism. Ithaca; London: Cornell University Press. p. 195. ISBN 0-8014-3649-4.
- Spencer, Robin (2004). "Whistler, James Abbott McNeill". Oxford Dictionary of National Biography (online ed.). Oxford University Press. doi:10.1093/ref:odnb/36855. (Subscription, Wikipedia Library access or UK public library membership required.)
- Taylor, Hilary (1978). James McNeill Whistler. London: Studio Vista. ISBN 0-289-70836-2.
- Weintraub, Stanley (1974). Whistler: A biography. London: Collins. ISBN 0-00-211994-3.
