= Peace Drinking Fountain =

Drinking fountain and sculpture in London

Coordinates: 51.518476°N 0.101134°W

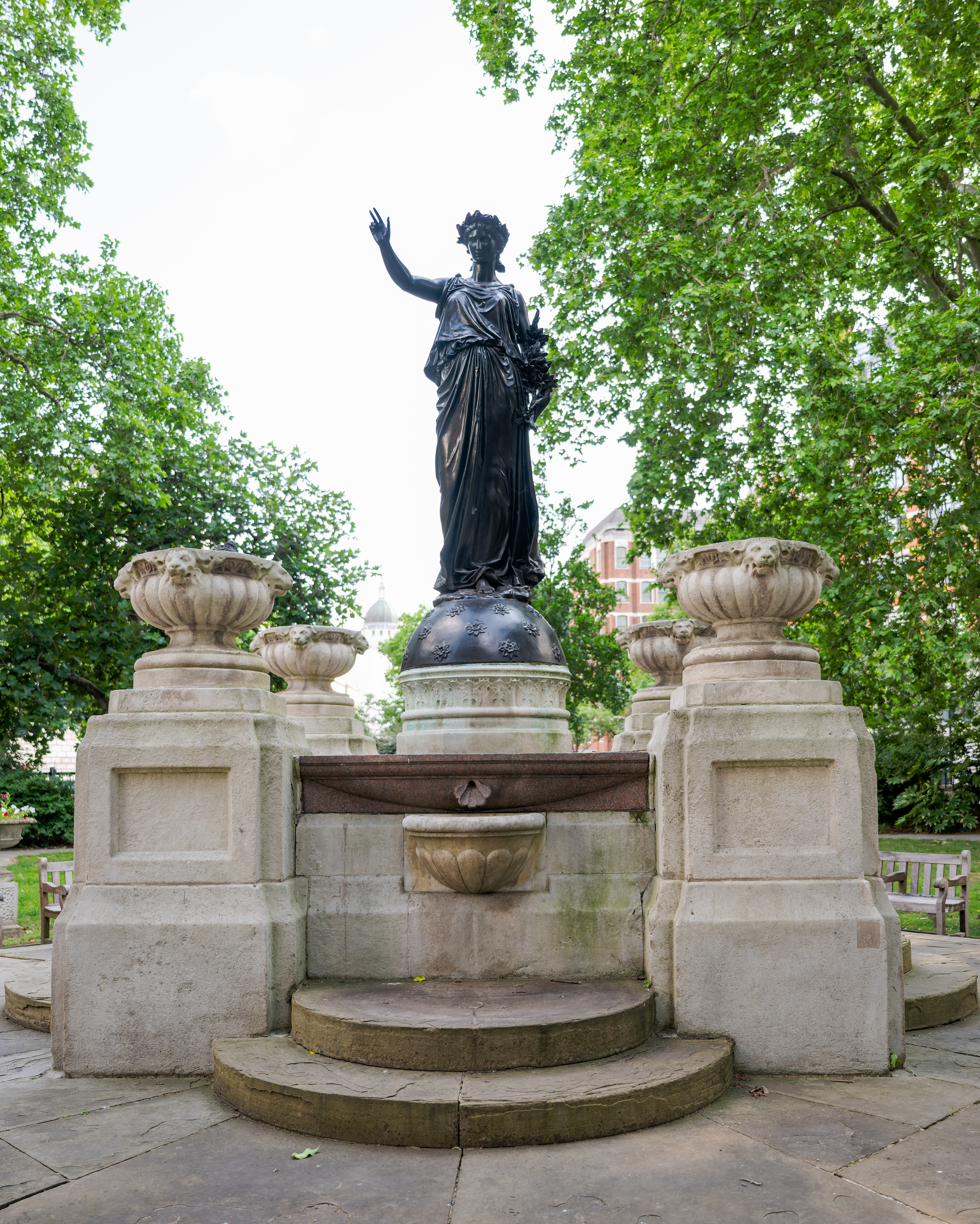
- Artist: John Birnie Philip and Farmer and Brindley with Francis Butler as architect
- Completion date: 1873
- Subject: Peace
- Location: London

Listed Building – Grade II
- Official name: Drinking Fountain in Centre of Gardens
- Designated: 5 June 1972
- Reference no.: 1358895

The Peace Drinking Fountain is a fountain in the City of London. It was installed in 1873 as the centrepiece of Smithfield Rotunda Garden, which was laid out the year before; both the fountain and the garden are listed at Grade II. A bronze statue of Peace by John Birnie Philip stands at the centre of the structure, which was originally surmounted by a domed canopy in a Romanesque style.

== Background ==
Smithfield Market was rebuilt in the 1860s, following the Metropolitan Meat and Poultry Market Act 1860. The market buildings, designed by Horace Jones, were completed in 1868. The site where the fountain sits is south of the market and was earmarked for the construction of a public garden by the City of London Corporation's Market Improvement Committee.

The committee found funding in the form of a bequest which had been provided by the jeweller to Elizabeth I, Sir Martin Bowes, for the upkeep of conduits within the City. By 1870, the bequest had accrued a value of £1,200, which was used for the construction of the garden. Horace Jones, who had designed Smithfield Market, was tasked with the design of the fountain, which included a requirement by the Charity Commissioners to incorporate a statue of Bowes. The design was possibly based on the statue of Sir Hugh Myddelton on Islington Green, which Jones quoted as having cost equal to the budget provided by the bequest.

The committee disagreed with the designs on the grounds that it was not intended to be a monument to Bowes, but instead a public drinking fountain. They rejected an offer by the Metropolitan Drinking Fountain and Cattle Trough Association to construct the fountain. A competition was instead held in 1871 for the design of the fountain, with few requirements other than a price within the £1,200 budget. Entries were exhibited in the Guildhall's crypt; the entrants included Edward William Wyon, Farmer and Brindley (who would ultimately produce sculptures for the fountain) and Joseph Edgar Boehm, entering with a design later exhibited at the Annual International Exhibition of the same year. Francis Butler was chosen as the winner, and John Birnie Philip was selected to be the sculptor of the central figure.

== Design ==
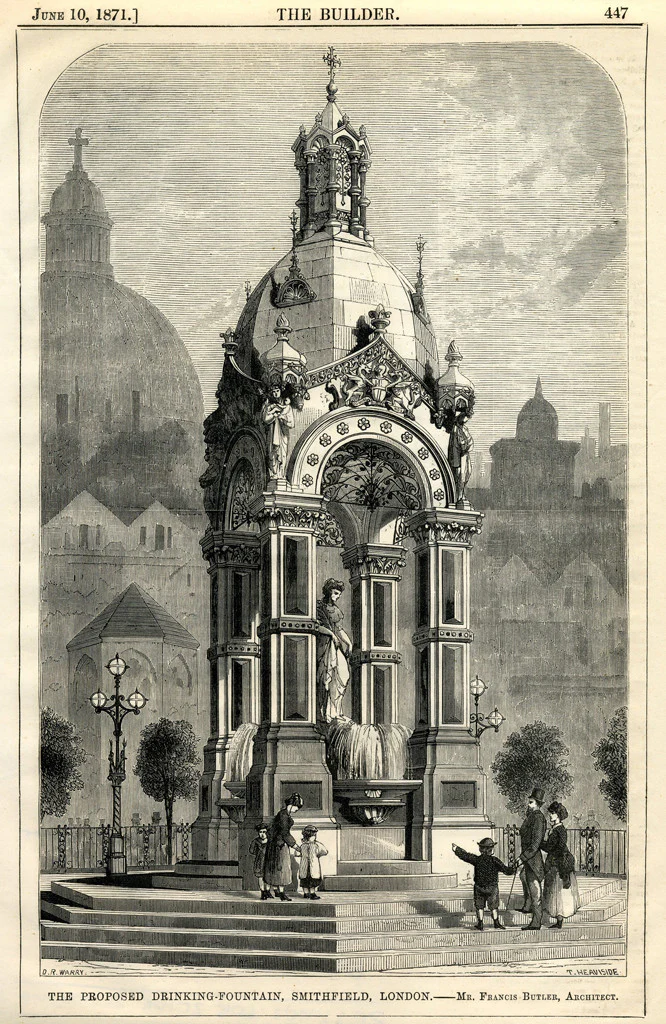
The proposed 1871 design by Francis Butler with the canopy and dome, as shown in The Builder

The original design is pictured in an 1871 edition of The Builder in their coverage of the submissions for the design competition. Butler's winning design was an elaborate structure with an ironwork canopy surmounted by an octagonal dome, which had been removed by at least 1906. It bore the arms of the City as well as of Sir Martin Bowes.

The structure stood upon a four-pier granite base, which survives to this day. On each corner stands a pedestal with granite bowls featuring lions' heads. The fountain itself is of Portland stone and granite, and stands on a wide stepped base of Yorkstone. Upon a circular plinth in the centre stands a figure, which was without an identification in the initial submission but eventually became Peace, possibly in reference to the Treaty of Frankfurt ending the Franco-Prussian War. The figure stands on a cloud and metal dome decorated with daffodils and inscribed with the name of the founders, Elkington & Co. She holds an olive branch in her left hand and wears a wheat crown.
