= Beatrice Whistler =

British artist and designer (1857–1896)

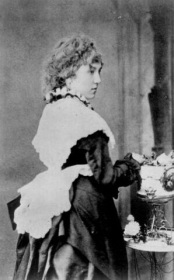
- c. 1887
- Born: 12 May 1857; Chelsea, London, England
- Died: 10 May 1896 (aged 38); Hampstead Heath, London, England
- Other names: Beatrix; Trixie
- Occupations: Artist and artist’s model
- Spouse(s): Edward William Godwin (1876–1885); James Abbott McNeill Whistler (1888–1896)
- Parent(s): John Birnie Philip and Frances Black

Beatrice Whistler (also known as Beatrix or Trixie; 12 May 1857 – 10 May 1896) was born in Chelsea, London on 12 May 1857. She was the eldest daughter of ten children of the sculptor John Birnie Philip and Frances Black. She studied art in her father's studio and with Edward William Godwin who was an architect-designer. On 4 January 1876 she became the second wife of Edward Godwin. Following the death of Godwin, Beatrice married James McNeill Whistler on 11 August 1888.

== Family ==
Edward Godwin and Beatrice had a son together, also called Edward (1876–1957), who became known as a sculptor. He created the bronze angels that were placed on the Whistlers' tomb in Chiswick Old Cemetery.

Her sister Ethel Whibley had been the secretary to Whistler before her marriage to the writer Charles Whibley. After the death of Beatrice in 1896, her younger sister Rosalind Birnie Philip acted as secretary to Whistler and was appointed Whistler's executrix in his will. In Whistler's correspondence Beatrice was referred to as 'Trixie' or 'Chinkie' and also ‘Luck’ and ‘Wam’; his sister-in-law and secretary (1890–1894) Ethel Whibley was 'Bunnie'; his brother-in-law Charles Whibley was 'Wobbles'; and Rosalind was referred to as (the 'Major'); with Whistler signing family correspondence as the 'General' when he did not sign with his butterfly signature.

== Marriage to James McNeill Whistler ==
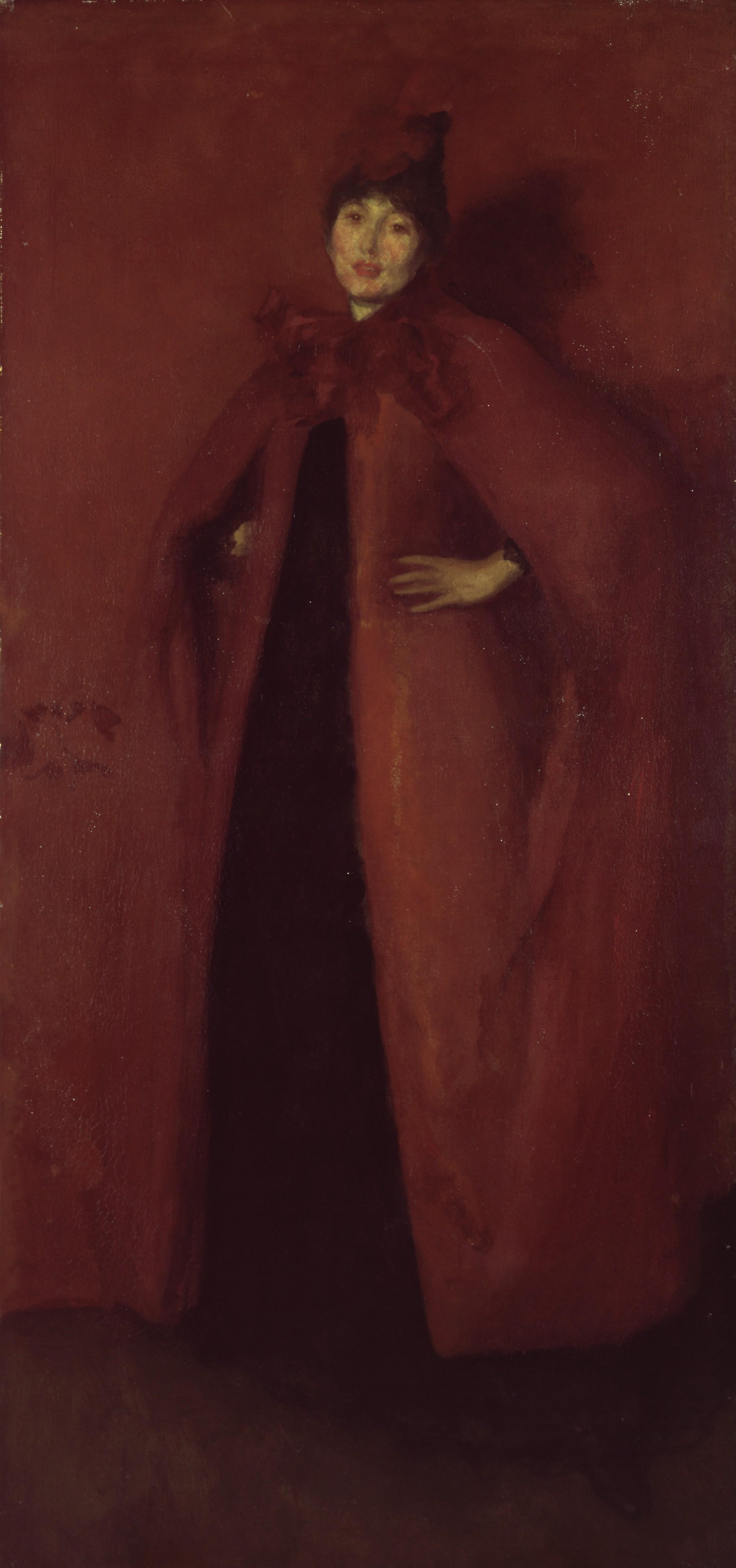
Harmony in Red: Lamplight used Beatrice as the model

Maud Franklin had been Whistler's main model since the 1870s and became Whistler's mistress. She called herself "Mrs Whistler", with Whistler usually referring to her in company as "Madame". Whistler showed no intention of marrying Maud. Through his friendship with Edward Godwin, Whistler became close to Beatrice (or "Trixie" as he called her). Whistler painted her in the full-length portrait titled Harmony in Red: Lamplight (GLAHA 46315). In 1885 Beatrice separated from her husband as a result of his compulsive philandering. Godwin died in 1886. By the summer of 1888 Whistler and Beatrice appeared in public as a couple. At a dinner Louise Jopling and Henry Labouchère insisted that they should be married before the end of the week.

The wedding was arranged; as a member of Parliament, Henry Labouchère arranged for the Chaplain to the House of Commons to marry the couple. No publicity was given to the ceremony to avoid the possibility of a furious Maud Franklin interrupting the marriage ceremony. The marriage took place on 11 August 1888, with the ceremony attended by a reporter from the Pall Mall Gazette, so that the event received publicity after the event. The couple left soon after for Paris, to avoid any risk of a scene with Maud.

After their marriage they lived in Tower House, 33 Tite Street, then in 1889, Whistler and Beatrice moved to 21 Cheyne Walk, in Chelsea, London. After an indifferent reception to his solo show in the Goupil Gallery, London, featuring mostly his nocturnes, Whistler abruptly decided he had had enough of London. He and Beatrice moved to Paris in 1892 and resided at n° 110 Rue du Bac, Paris, with his studio at the top of 86 Rue Notre Dame des Champs in Montparnasse.

He was at the top of his career when it was discovered that Beatrice had cancer. They returned to London in February 1896, taking rooms at the Savoy Hotel while they sought medical treatment. Whistler's portraits of her, The Siesta (C.159) and By the Balcony (C.160), were drawn as she lay dying. She died at St. Jude's Cottage in Hampstead Heath on 10 May 1896 and was buried on her birthday, 12 May, in Chiswick Old Cemetery in the London Borough of Hounslow. Following his death Whistler was buried in the same tomb as his wife.

== Paintings and drawings ==
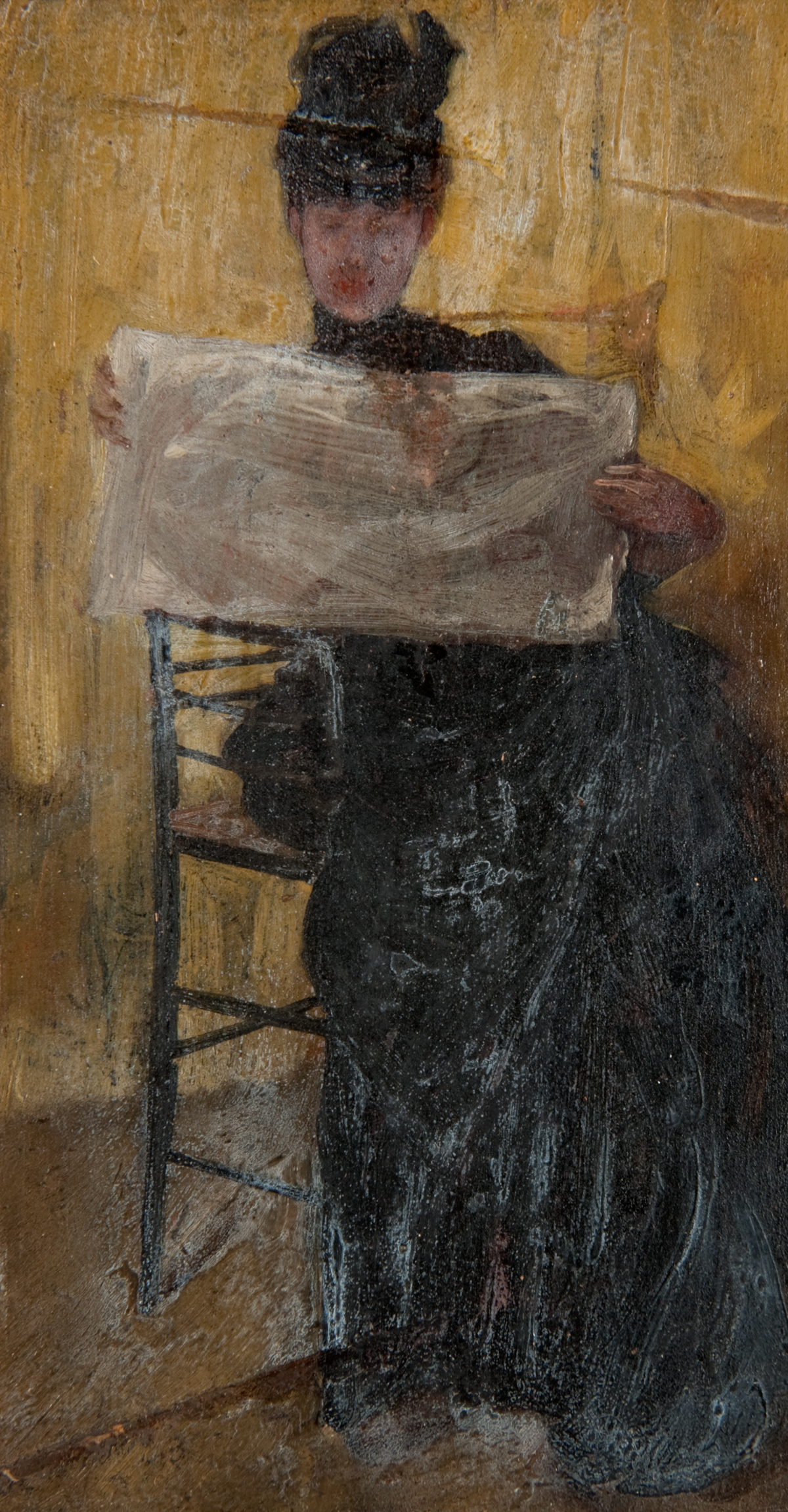
Ethel Philip reading a newspaper by Beatrix Whistler

Beatrice signed her work with a monogram or trefoil 'BP', then 'BG'. She also exhibited as 'Rix Birnie' to avoid being stigmatised as a female artist. A limited number of her works remain: oil studies The Novel and The Muslin Gown are in private collections; Ethel Philip Reading a Newspaper is in the Hunterian Museum and Art Gallery; and Peach Blossom is in the National Gallery of Art, Washington D.C. Her jewellery designs are in the National Gallery of Art and the Hunterian Museum and Art Gallery.

Images of her that were painted by Whistler include:

Paintings

Harmony in Red: Lamplight (GLAHA 46315), a full-length portrait.

Drawings

The Siesta (C.159) and By the Balcony (C.160).

Louise Jopling (1843–1933), a poet and portrait painter, also painted a portrait of Beatrice.
