= Maud Franklin =

English painter

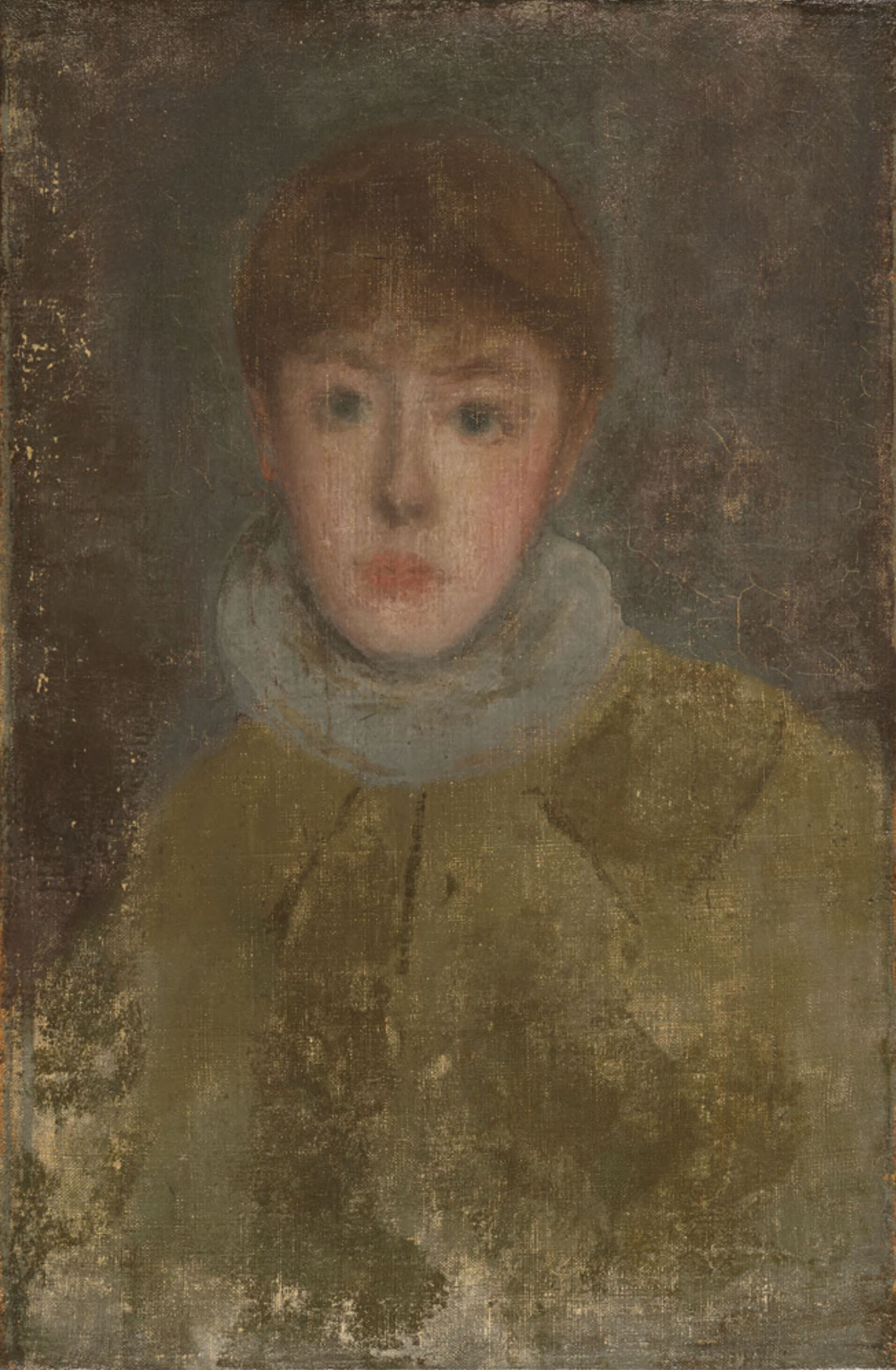
- Miss Maud Franklin by James McNeill Whistler, c. 1872–1873
- Born: Mary Franklin; January 9, 1857; Bicester, Oxfordshire, England
- Died: 18 November 1939 (aged 82); Cannes, France
- Other name: Clifton Lin
- Occupations: Model, Artist
- Spouses: John A. Little (died 1904) Richard H. S. Abbott (m. 1911)
- Partner: James McNeill Whistler (mid-1870s–1888)
- Children: 3

Maud Franklin (9 January 1857 – 18 November 1939) was an English artist and the mistress and model for artist James McNeill Whistler.

== Life ==
Franklin was born in Bicester, Oxfordshire, England, one of six children of Charles Franklin, an upholsterer and cabinetmaker, and Mary Clifton, after whom she was christened 'Mary'. She may have posed for Whistler as early as 1872, as a stand-in for his portrait of Mrs. Frances Leyland, when she was fifteen.

By the late 1870s, she was serving as a model to Whistler for etchings and painted portraits, most notably the Arrangement in White and Black. She also was the initial model for what would be the Portrait of Miss Florence Leyland, as well as Harmony in Grey and Peach Colour, numerous other oils, drawings, watercolours, etchings and lithographs.

Franklin had two daughters by Whistler: Ione (born circa 1877) and Maud McNeill Whistler Franklin (born 1879). She sometimes referred to herself as 'Mrs. Whistler', and in the census of 1881 gave her name as 'Mary M. Whistler'.

She was not always well treated by Whistler; at the time of his libel trial with John Ruskin in January 1879 he left Franklin, then pregnant, in a London hotel under the pretence that he was in Paris. Following Whistler's bankruptcy later that year, she accompanied him to Venice, but was not accepted into society. In the 1880s her health suffered, and she was the subject of watercolours by Whistler depicting her in bed.

During the 1880s, she exhibited her own artwork at the Grosvenor Gallery under the pseudonym Clifton Lin, and at the Society of British Artists.

After Whistler married Beatrice Godwin in 1888, Franklin moved to Paris. She married a New York man named John A. Little; in 1904 he died, and around 1911 Franklin married another American, Richard H. S. Abbott, and lived near Cannes until her death in 1939 aged 82.

== Depictions by Whistler ==
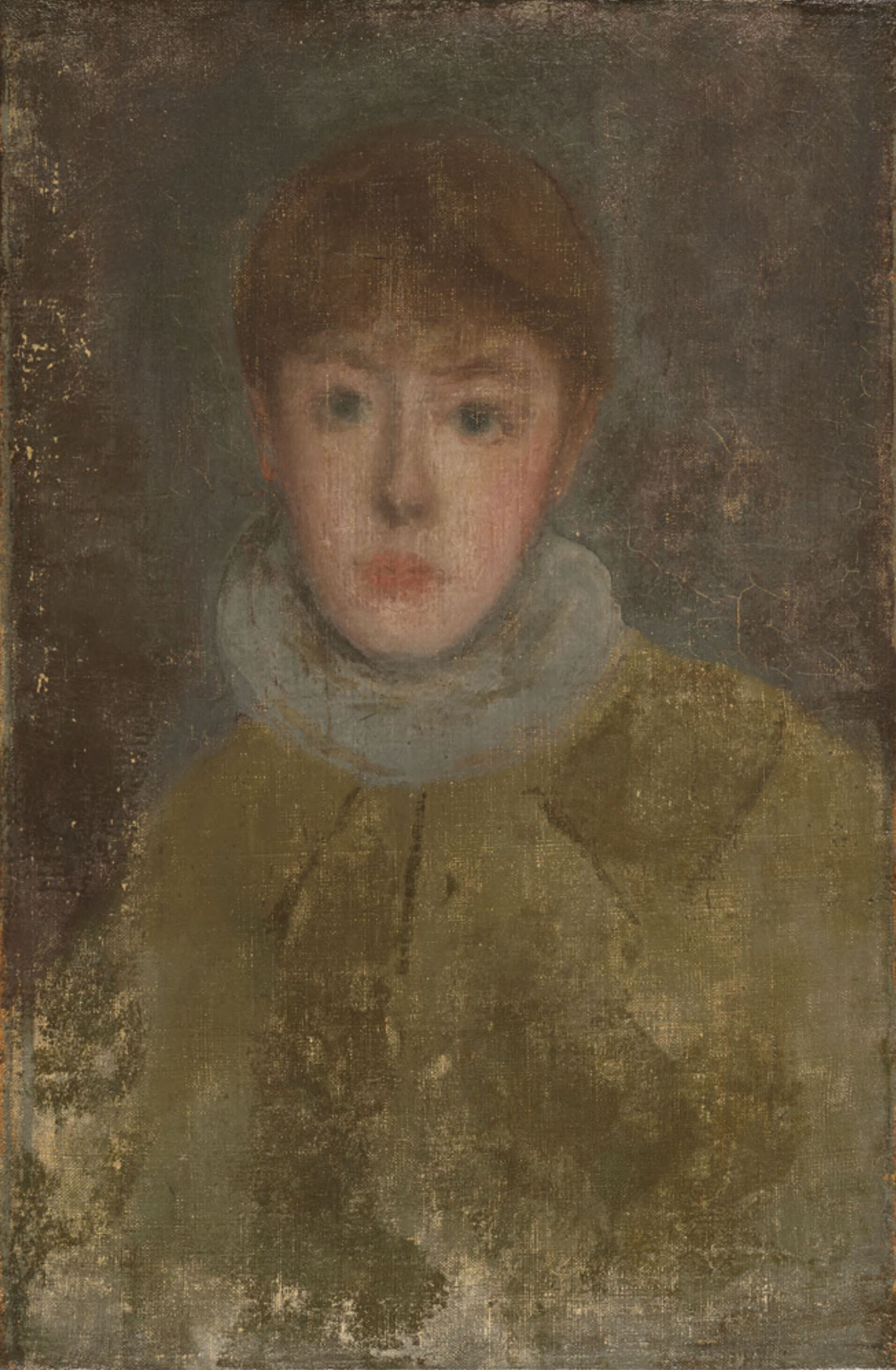
Miss Maud Franklin, c. 1872–1873, Fogg Museum of Art

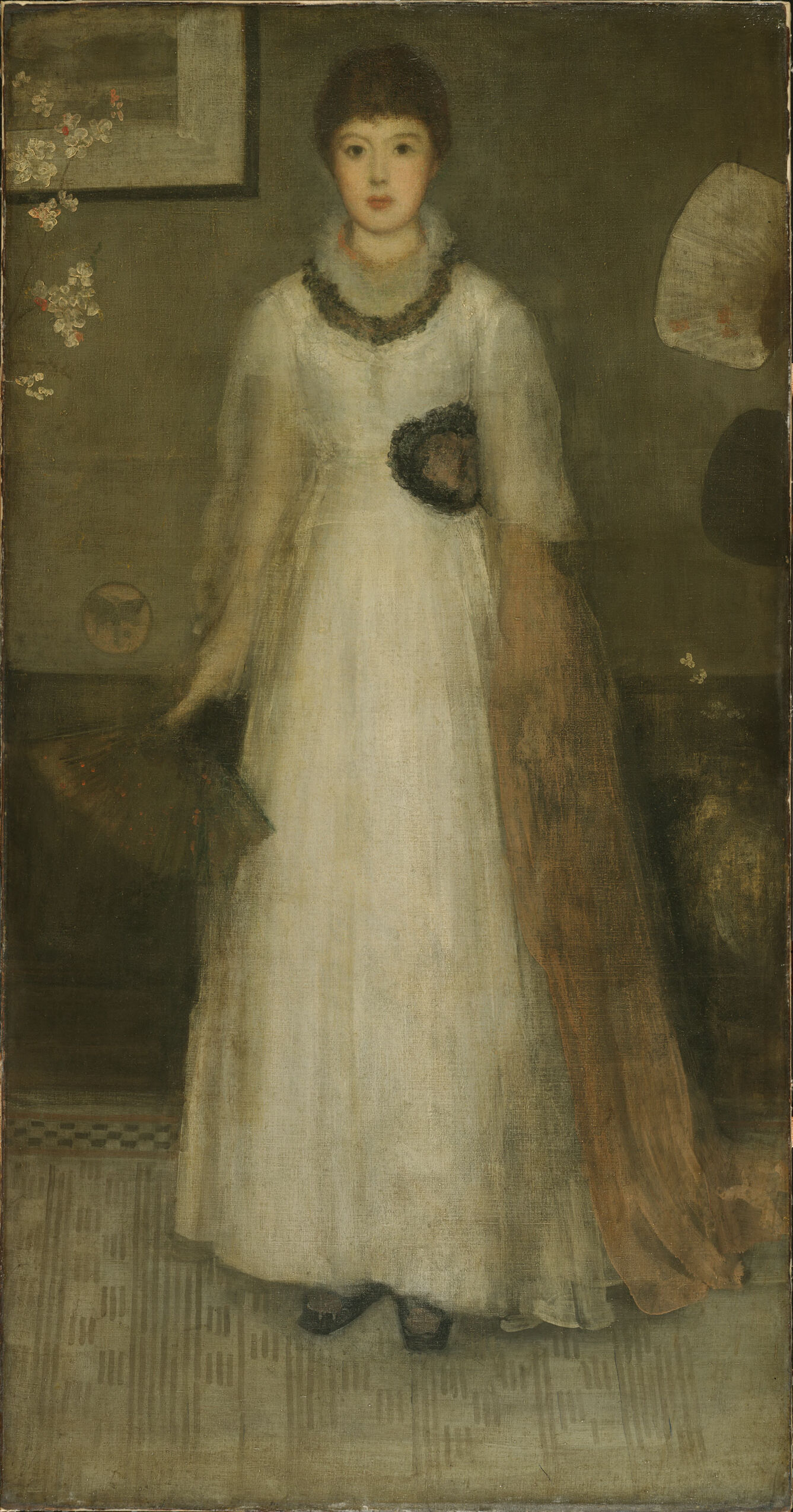
Harmony in Grey and Peach Colour, 1872–1874, Fogg Museum of Art

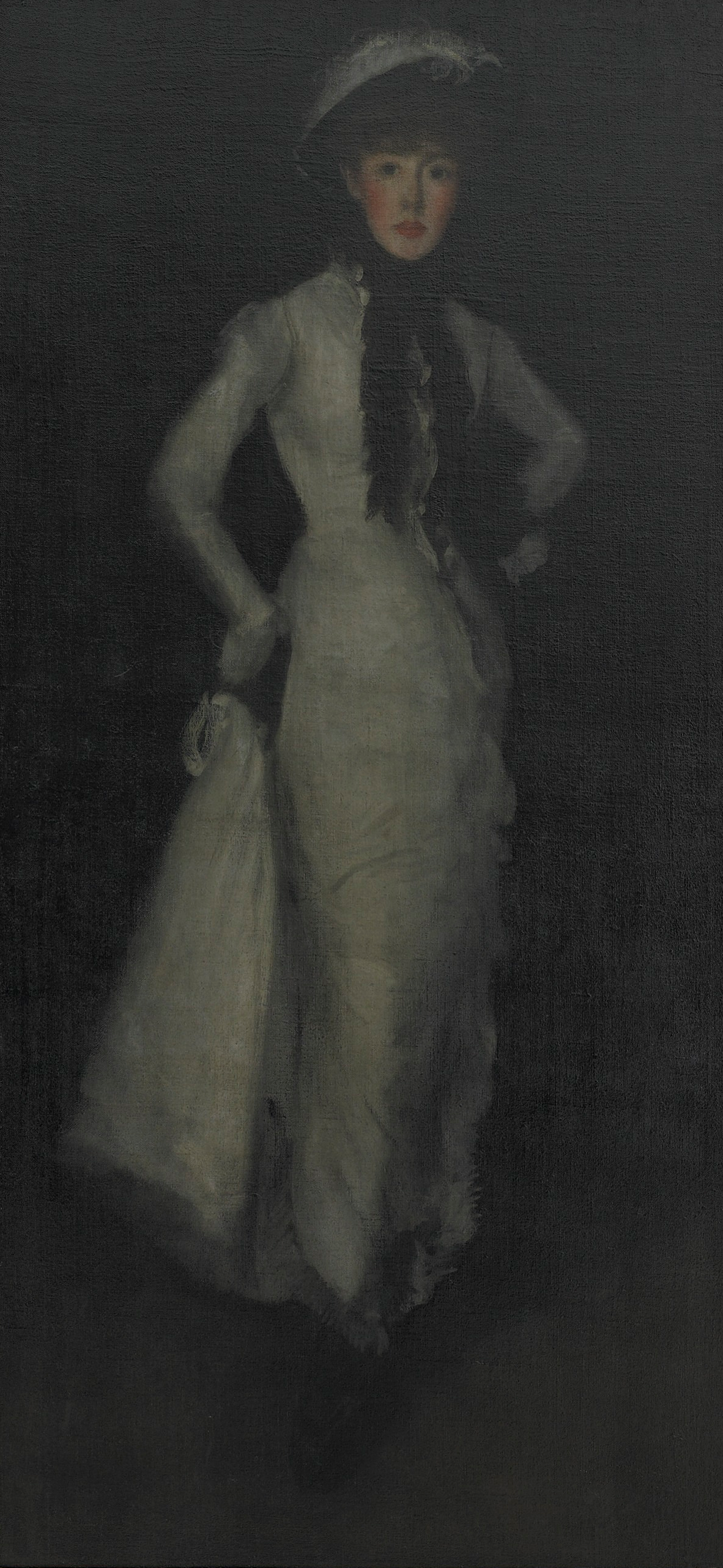
Arrangement in White and Black, c. 1876, Freer Gallery of Art

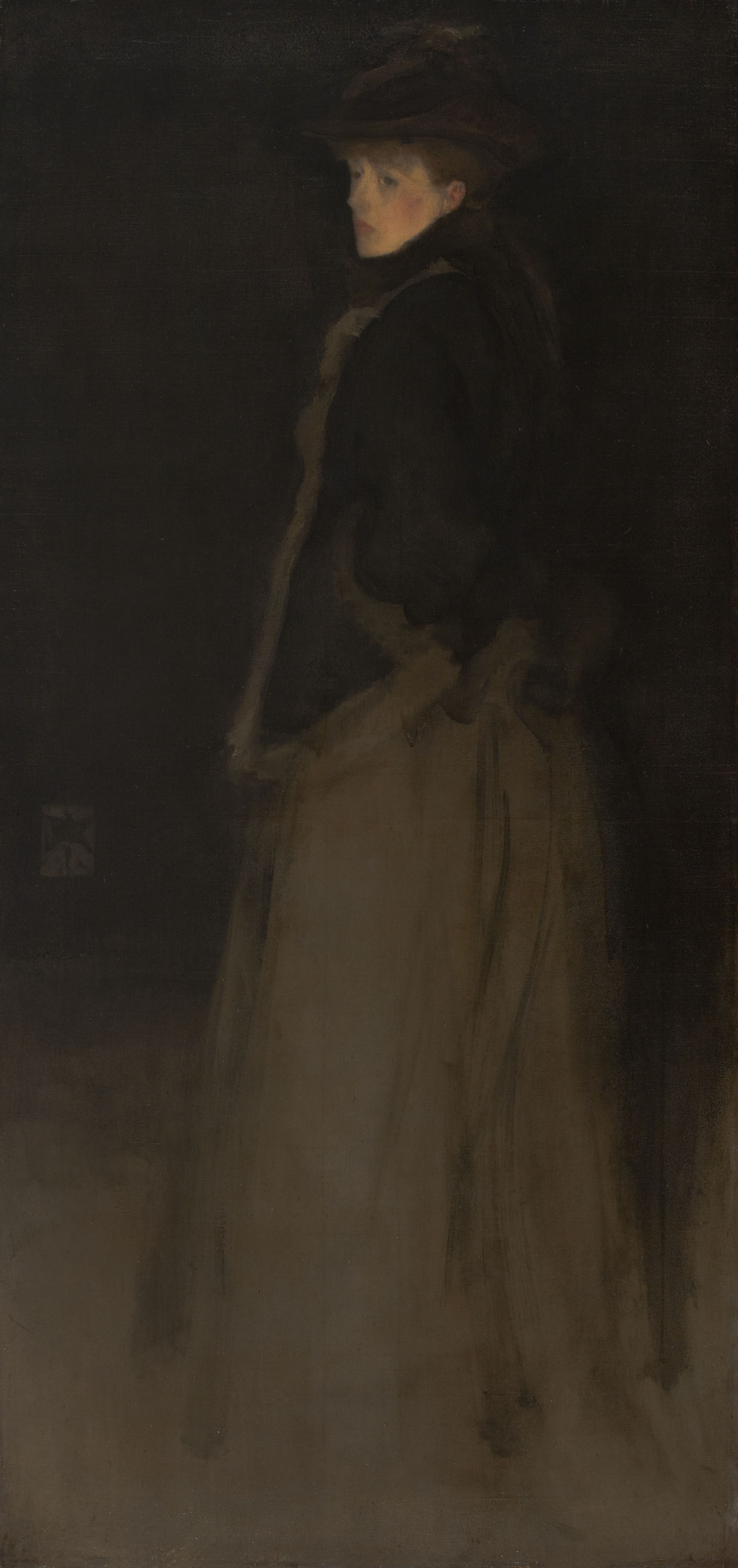
Arrangement in Black and Brown: The Fur Jacket, 1877, Worcester Art Museum

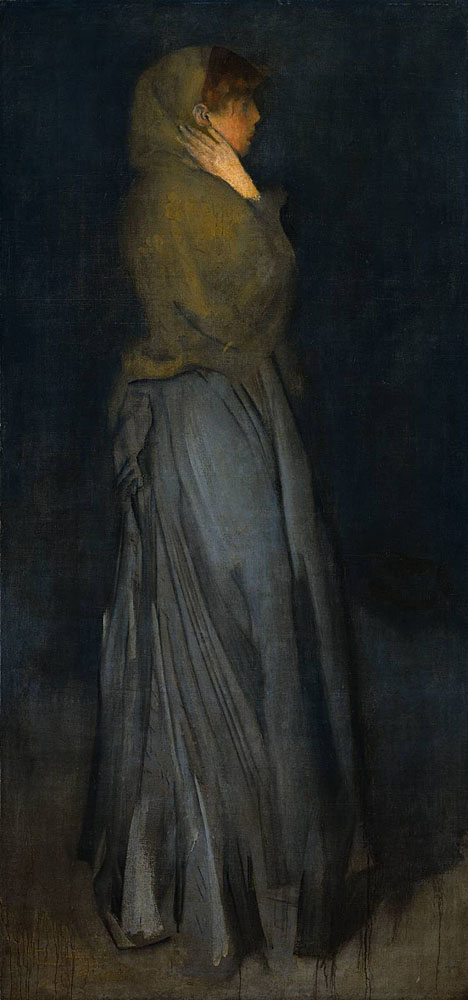
Arrangement in Yellow and Grey: Effie Deans, 1878, Rijksmuseum

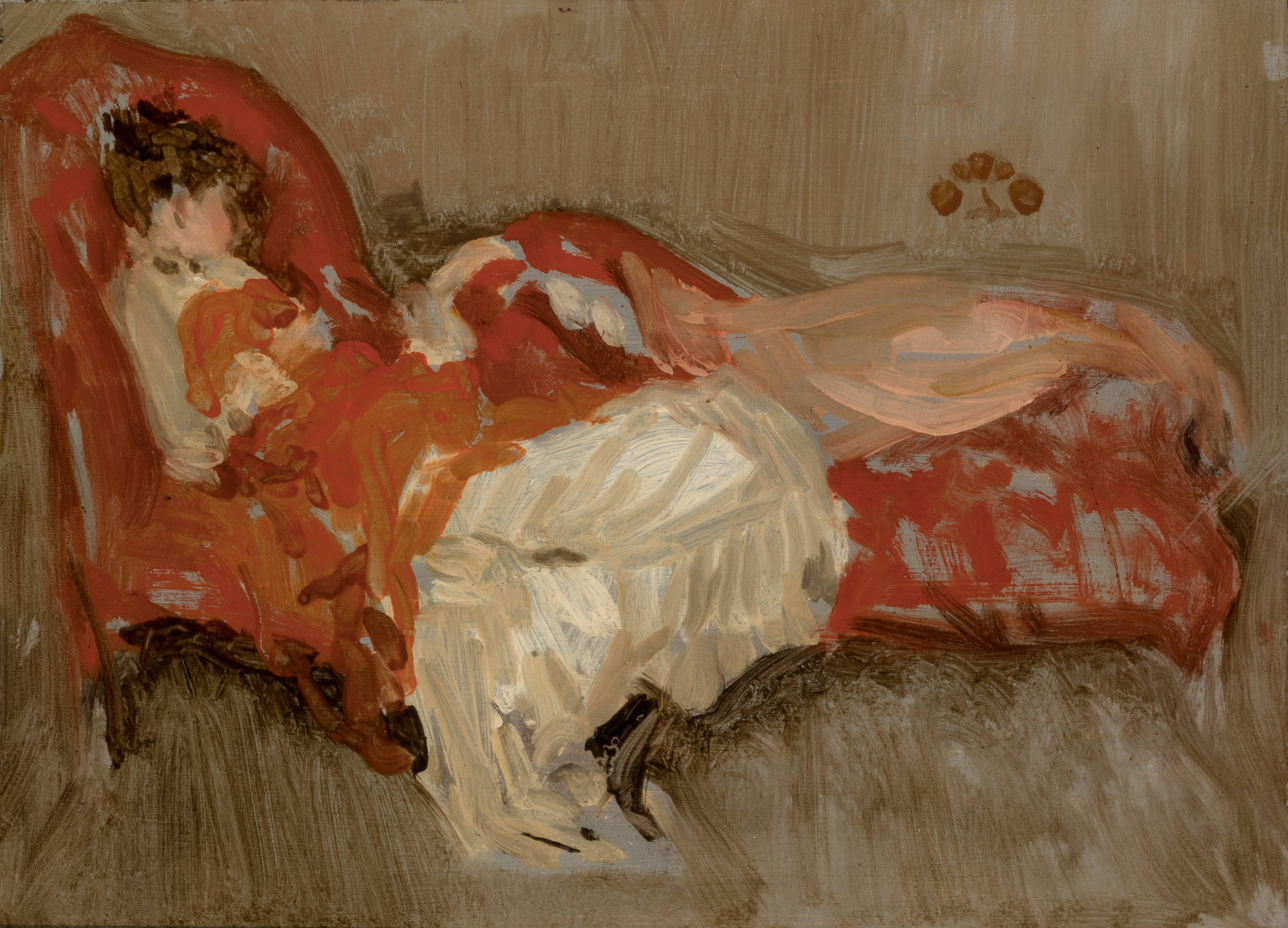
Note in Red: The Siesta, 1883–1884, Terra Foundation for American Art

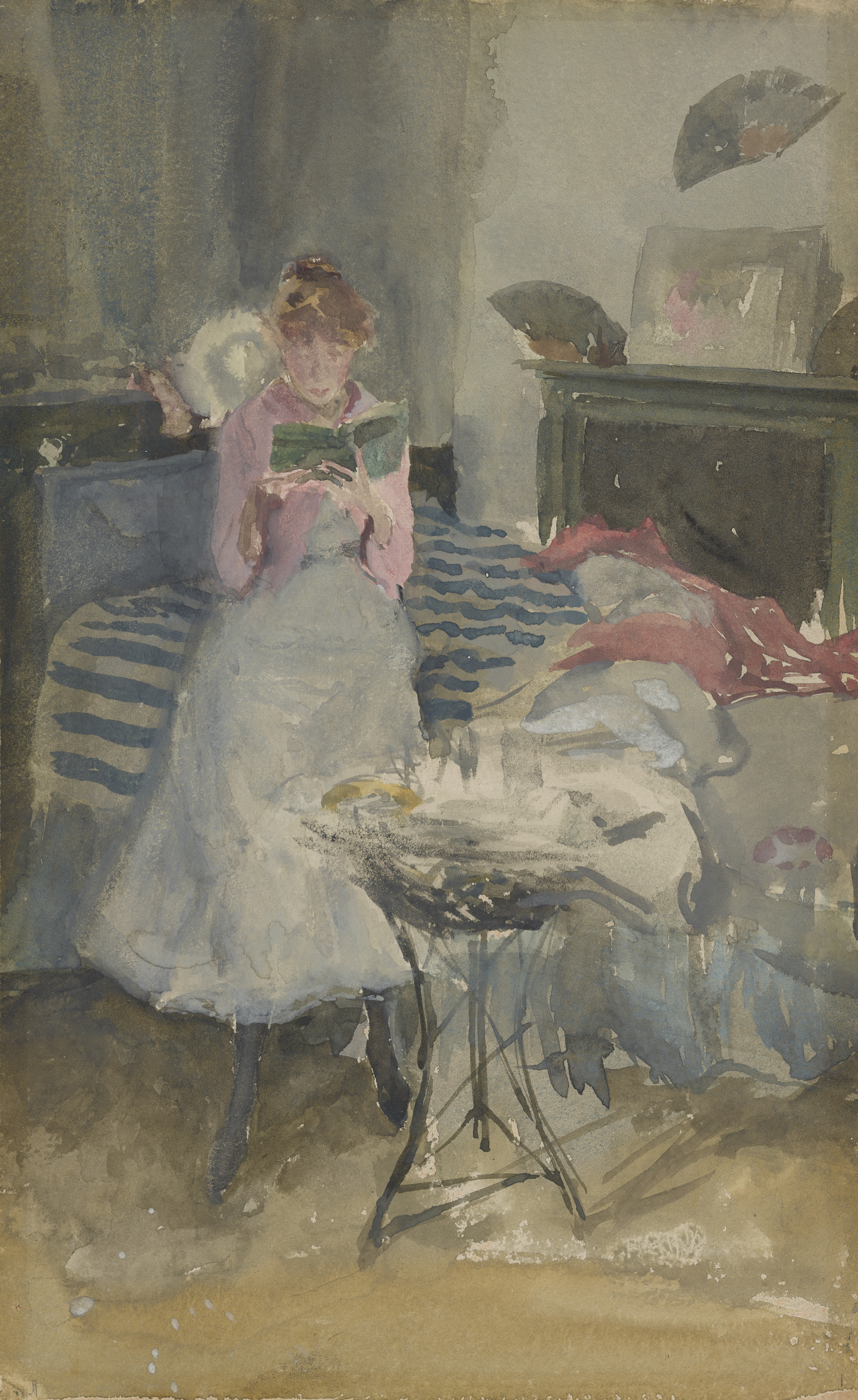
Pink Note–The Novelette, 1883–1884, Freer Gallery of Art

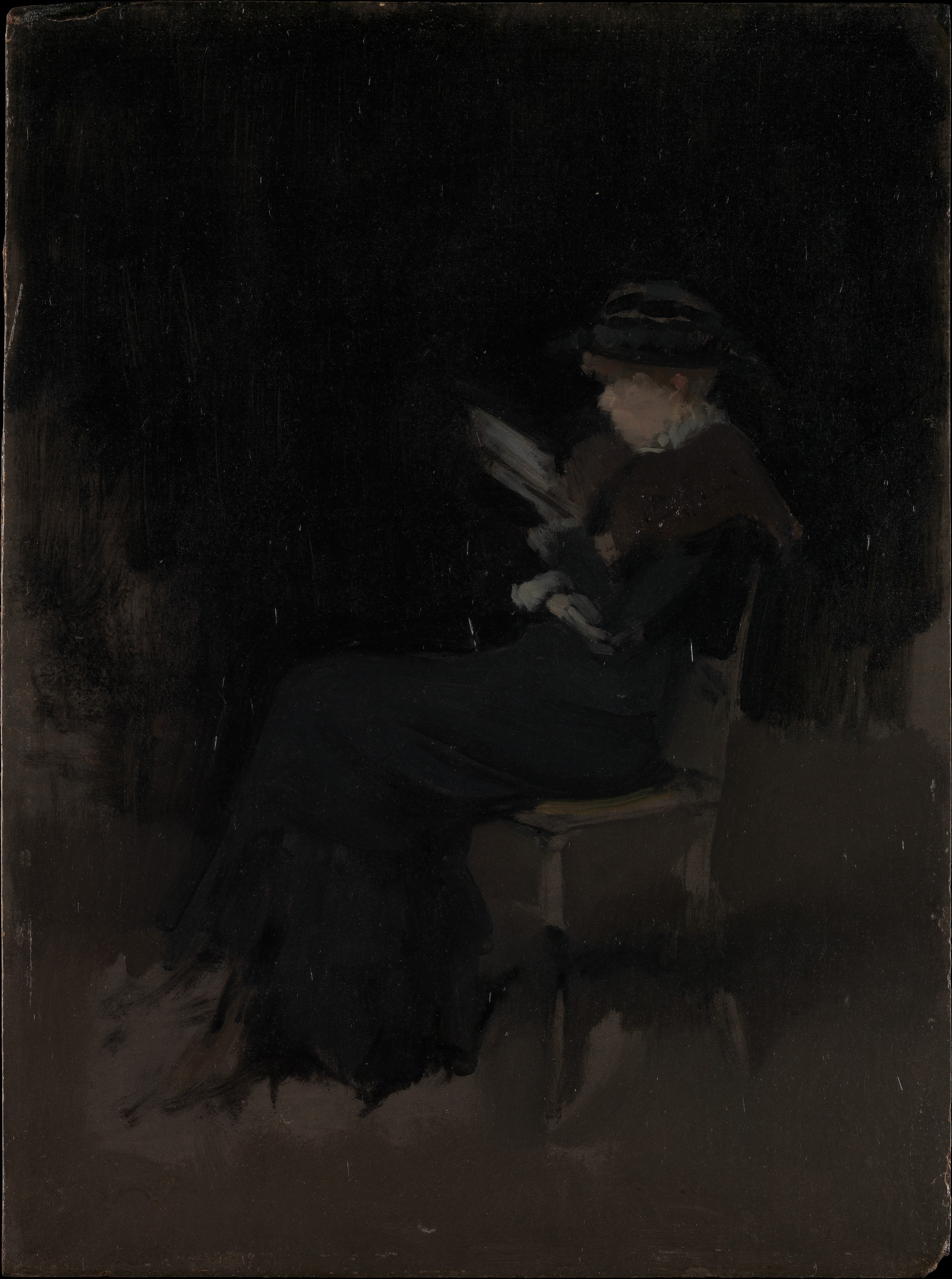
Arrangement in Black: Girl Reading, c. 1880s, Metropolitan Museum of Art
