= Farmer & Brindley =

British architectural sculpture business

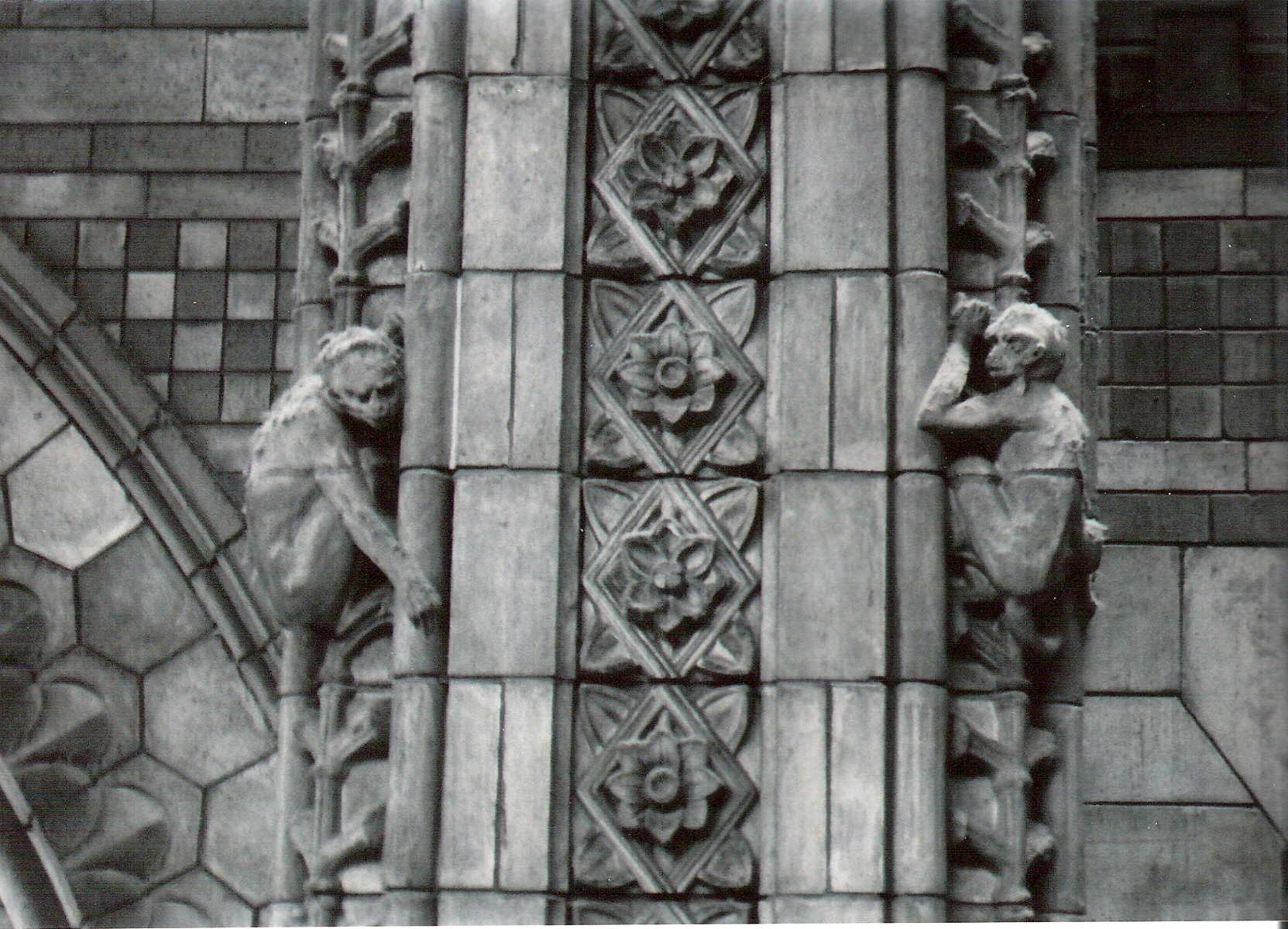
Arch detail, Natural History Museum, London

Farmer & Brindley was a firm of architectural sculptors and ornamentalists based in London, founded by William Farmer (1825–1879) and William Brindley (1832–1919).

The firm, located on Westminster Bridge Road in Lambeth, south London, flourished as stone and woodcarvers in the Victorian era, supplying sculpted figures, carved and terracotta patterns of exterior ornamentation and interior woodcarving and church furnishings. The firm also acted as an importer and merchant of coloured marble.

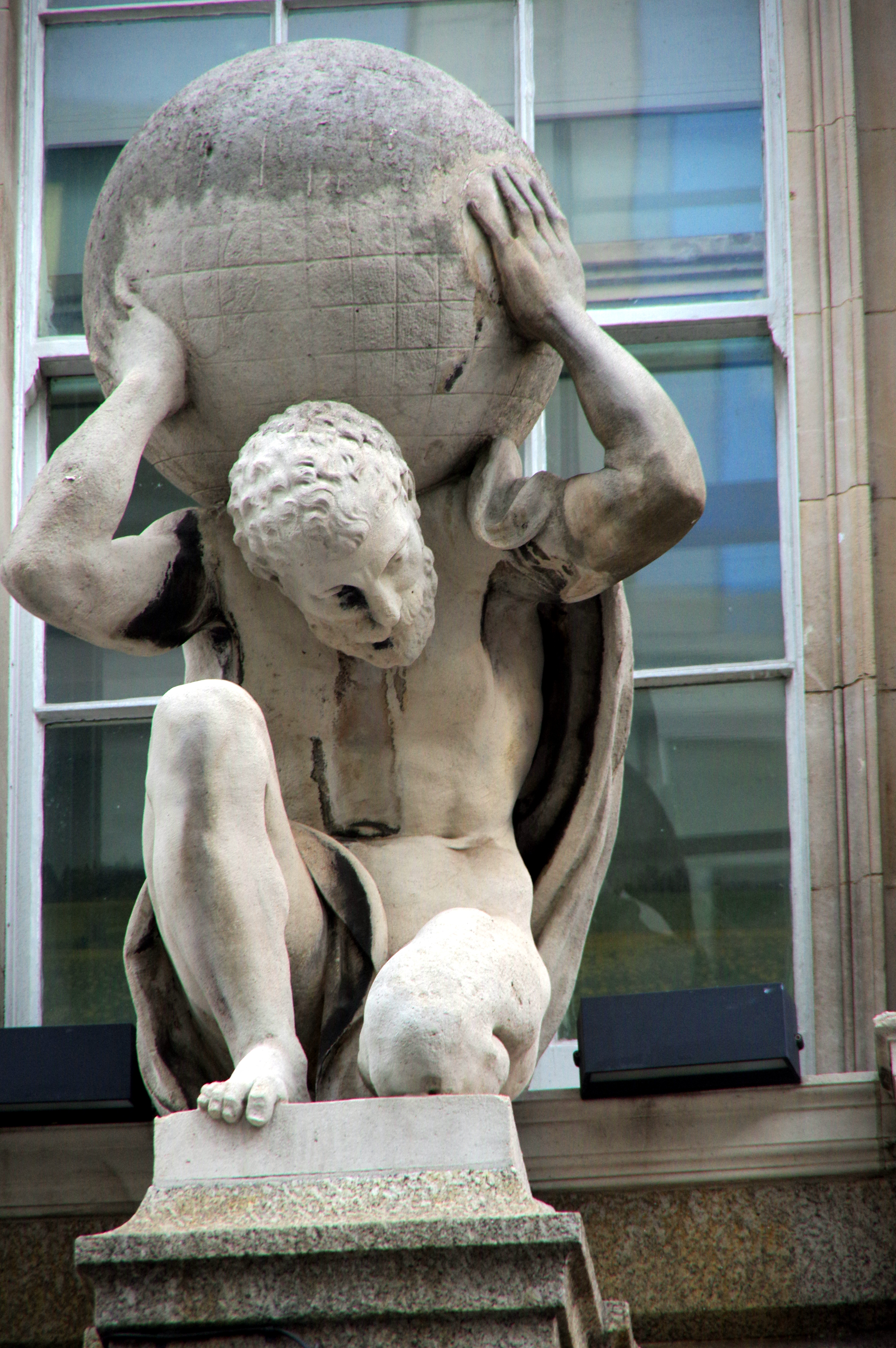
Atlas with Globe, King Street, City of London

Brindley began as an employed stone carver for Farmer, and they became partners in the 1860s. For architect Alfred Waterhouse alone they collaborated on over 100 buildings, the most significant of which was London's Natural History Museum, with its innovative use of architectural terracotta cladding. After Farmer's death Brindley turned to writing, for instance collaborating with Sir Lawrence Alma-Tadema on Marbles Their Ancient and Modern Application.

Architect Sir George Gilbert Scott, the firm's "most notable and prolific patron", said of Brindley that he was "the best carver I have ever met and the one who best understands my views".

Farmer & Brindley employees included C. J. Allen, who was with the firm for ten years, John William Kitson (architectural sculptor) apprenticing 1860 – 1868 before moving to Philadelphia and then New York City, Francis Child, and Harry Bates, who apprenticed with them from 1869 to 1879. In 1887, the firm employed Furio and Attilio Piccirilli who had recently migrated from Italy to work on the reredos and altar then being carved for St Paul's Cathedral. (These same Piccirillis became among the most notable fine stonecarvers in turn-of-the-century New York City.) According to Ward-Jackson, the St Paul's reredos had been designed by Bodley and Garner and were to be the firm's magnum opus, but they met a hostile reception and were removed. also Léon-Joseph Chavalliaud, Amongst the works Chavalliaud completed during the fifteen or so years he remained in Britain were eight statues in bronze and marble of famous naturalists and explores including Mercator, Linnaeus, Henry the Navigator, Columbus, Darwin and Captain Cook c.1896. These surrounded the exterior of the Palm House in Sefton Park, Liverpool.

The firm merged with another one in 1929, at which point most of its records were lost.

== Selected commissions ==
- Architectural carving for the Albert Memorial in London, 1863–1875, for Sir George Gilbert Scott.
- Figures of Science and Fine Arts for the Holborn Viaduct, London, 1863–1869.
- Carving for the University of Glasgow, 1864–1870, also for Scott.
- Carving for the Peace Drinking Fountain in Smithfield, London, 1873.
- 35 seven-foot figures of British monarchs for the Bradford City Hall, 1873.
- Bishop's throne, Chester Cathedral, 1876.
- Twelve exterior statues for the 1877 Manchester Town Hall, for Alfred Waterhouse.
- Furnishings for the St Mary's Cathedral, Edinburgh (Episcopal), 1874–1879.
- Alabaster arch inside entrance of Leeds Central Library for George Corson, 1878–1884.
- Architectural sculpture for Institute of Chartered Accountants building, Moorgate, London. c. 1892. Additional sculpture was provided by William Hamo Thornycroft and Harry Bates.
- The Great Eastern Railway War Memorial at Liverpool Street station
- The sculptures for the Natural History Museum

== Sources ==
- Online biography
- Full Text: Emma Hardy, Farmer and Brindley - Craftsmen Sculptors 1850-1930 (London: Victorian Society, 1993)
- Ward-Jackson, Philip (2003), Public Sculpture of the City of London, Public Sculpture of Britain, vol. 7, Liverpool: Liverpool University Press
- New York Times February 8, 1888
