= Ethel Whibley =

British model

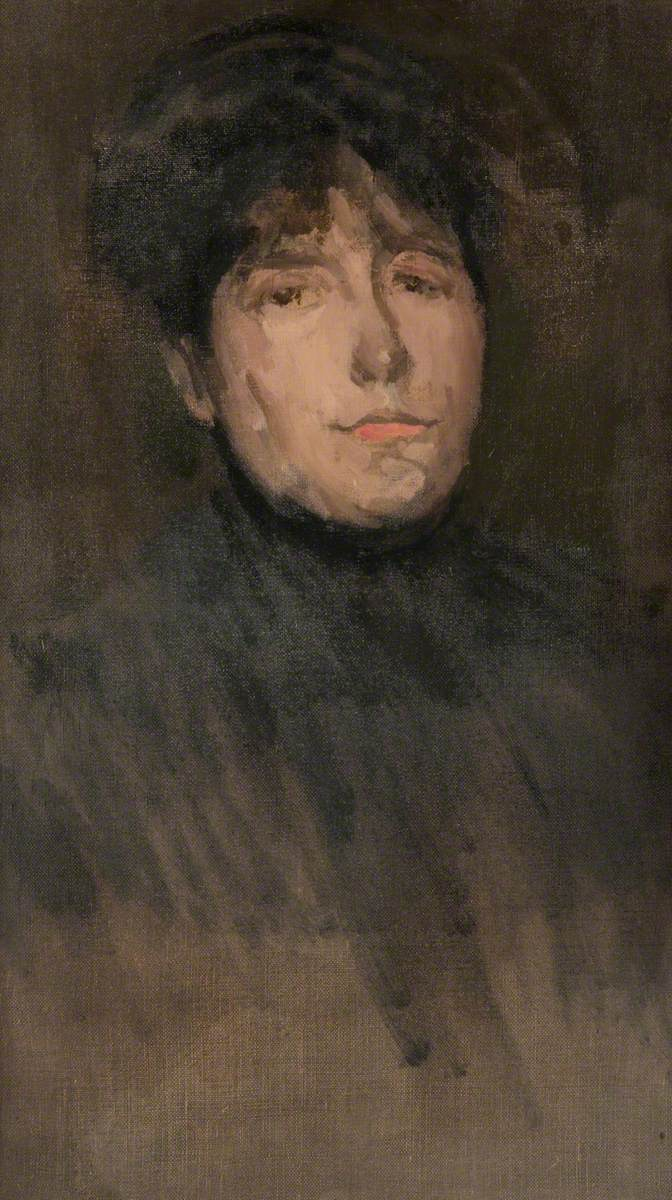
- Sketch of Miss Ethel Philip by James McNeill Whistler, 1897–1900
- Born: Ethel Birnie Philip; 29 September 1861; Chelsea, London, England
- Died: 21 May 1920 (aged 58); Paris, France
- Occupations: Secretary & model for James McNeill Whistler
- Spouse: Charles Whibley (m. 1894)
- Relatives: John Birnie Philip (father); Beatrice Whistler (sister); Rosalind Birnie Philip (sister)

Ethel Whibley (née Philip; 29 September 1861 – 21 May 1920) was the sister-in-law of James McNeill Whistler. Ethel was a secretary to Whistler who used Ethel as a model for a number of full-length portraits painted during the period 1888 to the mid-1890s. Her sister Beatrice (also called 'Beatrix' or 'Trixie') married James McNeill Whistler in 1888, following the death of her first husband Edward William Godwin. In 1896 Ethel married the writer Charles Whibley. Her sister Rosalind Birnie Philip (1873-1958) subsequently acted as secretary to Whistler and was appointed Whistler's executrix at his death.

== Life ==
Ethel was born at Chelsea, London on 29 September 1861. Ethel was 4th of ten children of the sculptor John Birnie Philip and Frances Black. Ethel married Charles Whibley in 1896 in the garden of the house occupied by James Abbott McNeill Whistler at n° 110 Rue du Bac, Paris.

Before her marriage Ethel worked for a time in 1893–94 as secretary to James McNeill Whistler. Whistler painted a number of full-length portraits of Ethel, including Mother of Pearl and Silver: The Andalusian and the watercolour Rose and Silver: Portrait of Mrs Whibley; and other sketches and etchings of her titled as Miss Ethel Philip or Mrs Whibley.

Correspondence between family members addressed personal, social and professional matters as Whistler's sisters-in-law acted as his models and secretaries to manage his business affairs. In correspondence Beatrice Whistler was referred to a 'Trixie' or 'Chinkie'; his sister-in-law and secretary (1890–94) Ethel Whibley was 'Bunnie'; his brother-in-law Charles Whibley was 'Wobbles'; his sister-in-law and secretary Rosalind Birnie Philip was referred to as the 'Major'; with Whistler signing family correspondence as the 'General' when he did not sign with his butterfly signature.

== Depictions by Whistler ==
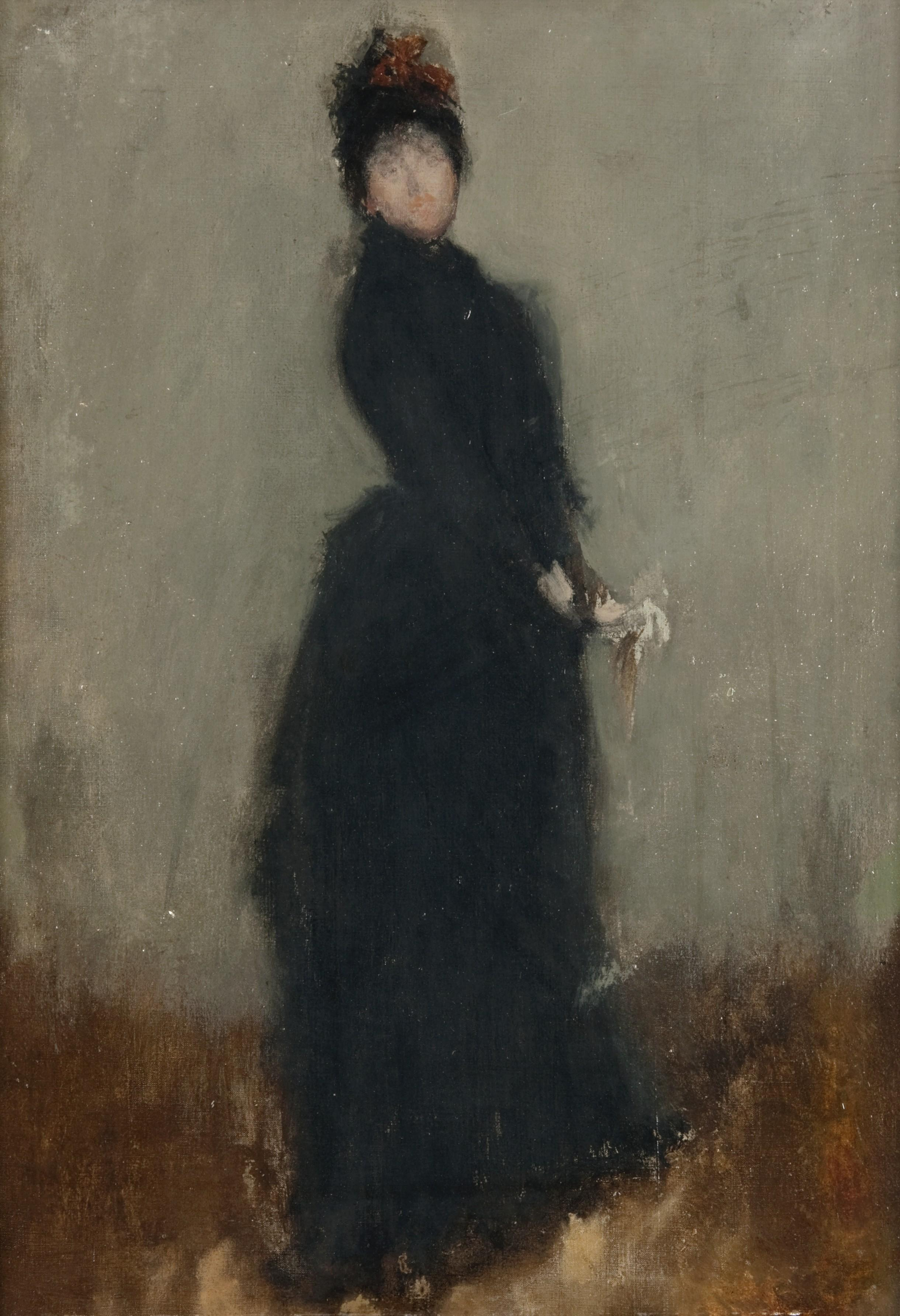
Sketch for a Portrait of Miss Ethel Philip, c. 1886–89, Hunterian Art Gallery

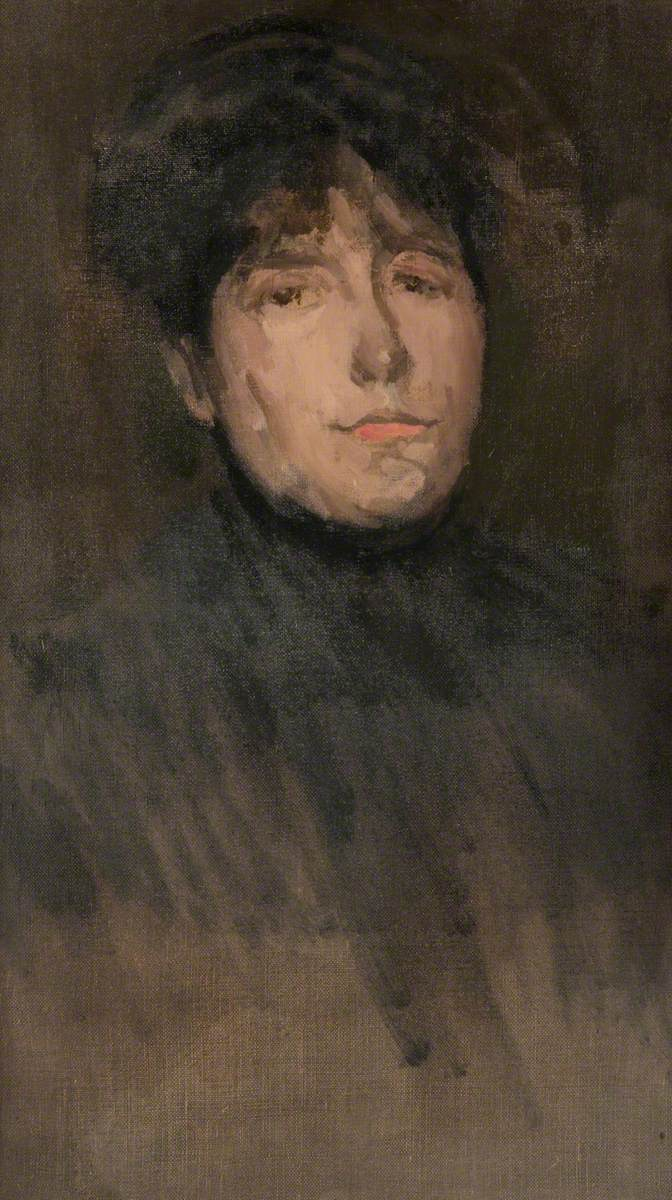
Sketch of Miss Ethel Philip, 1897–1900, Hunterian Art Gallery

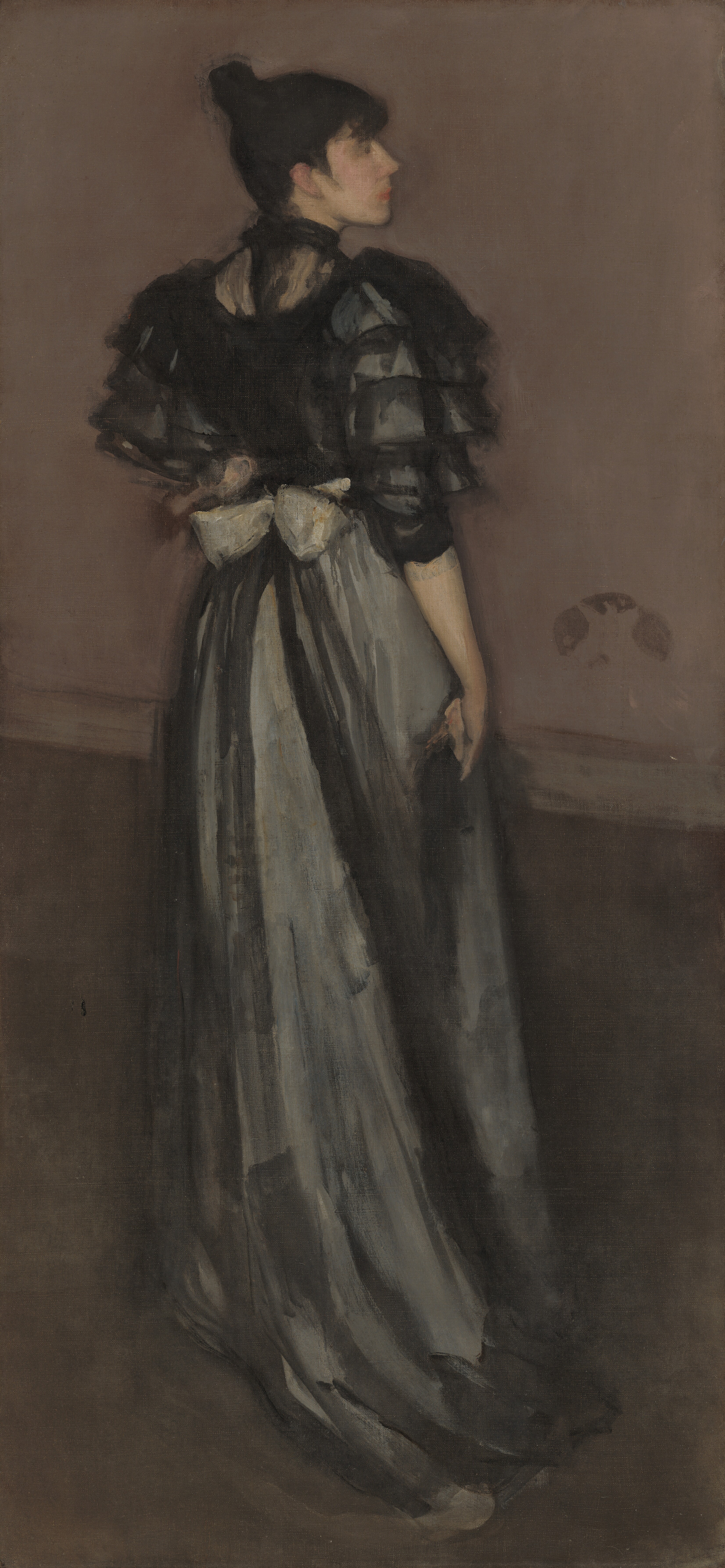
Mother of Pearl and Silver: The Andalusian, c. 1888–1900, National Gallery of Art

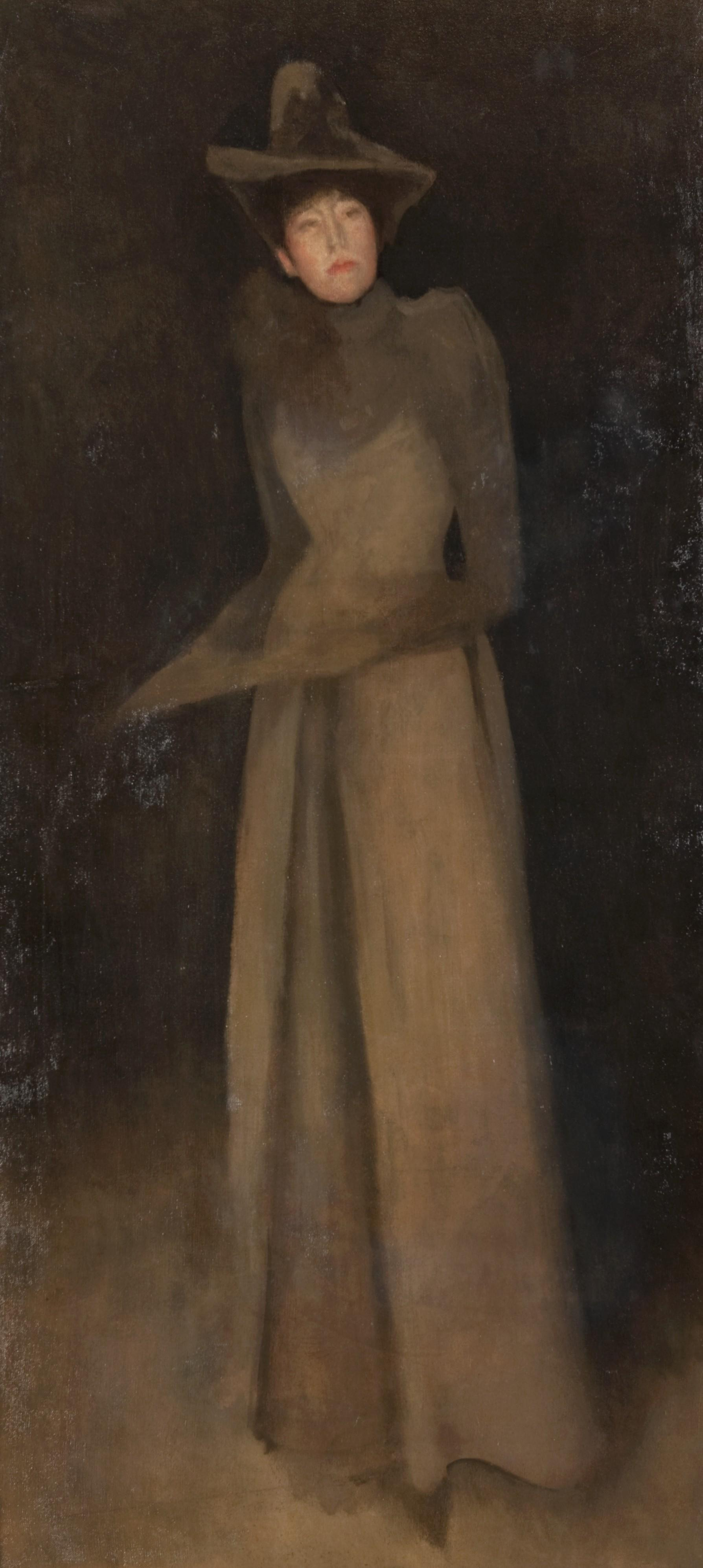
Harmony in Brown: The Felt Ha, c. 1890–02, Hunterian Art Gallery

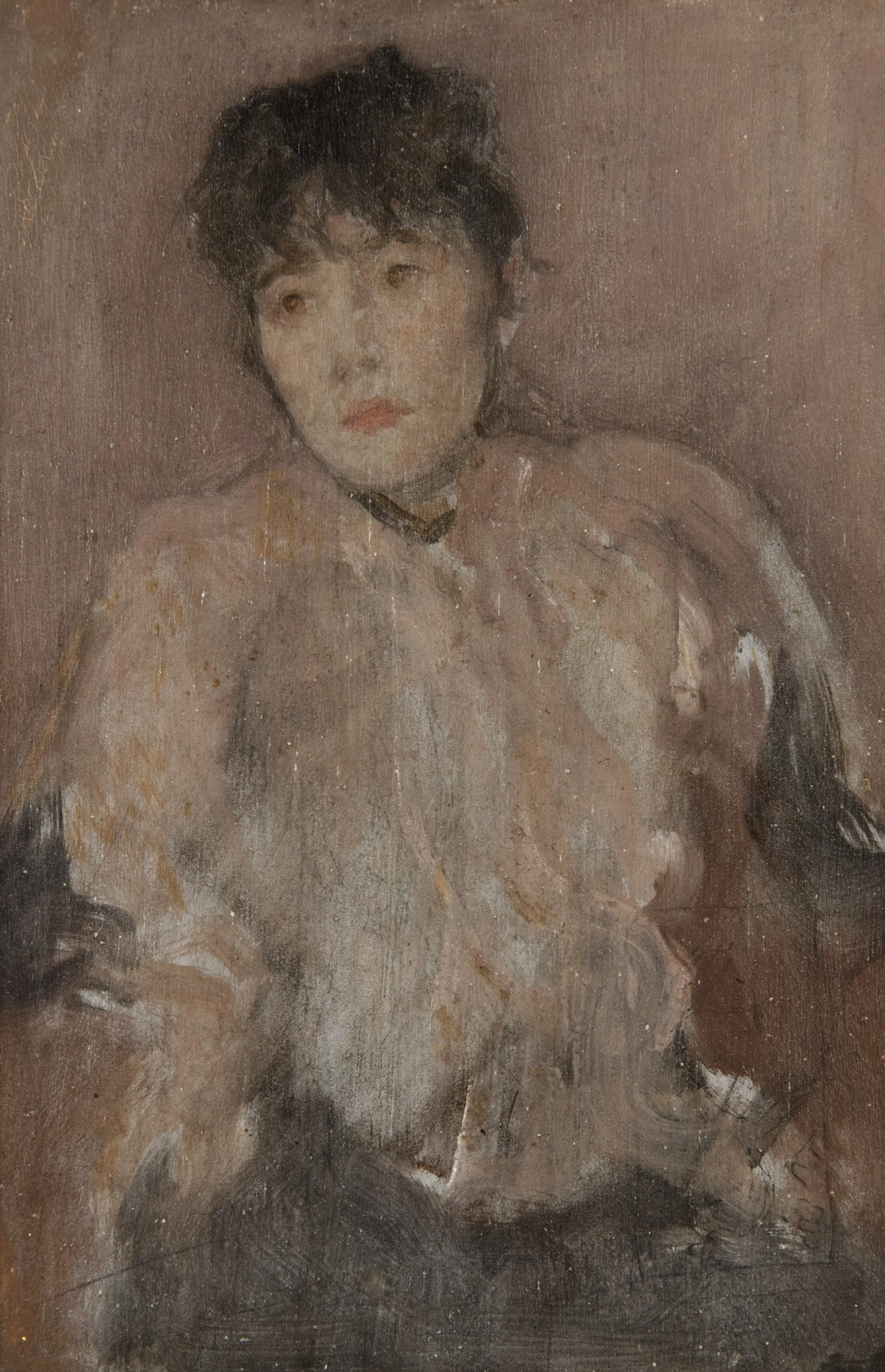
The Rose Scarf, 1890–92, Hunterian Art Gallery

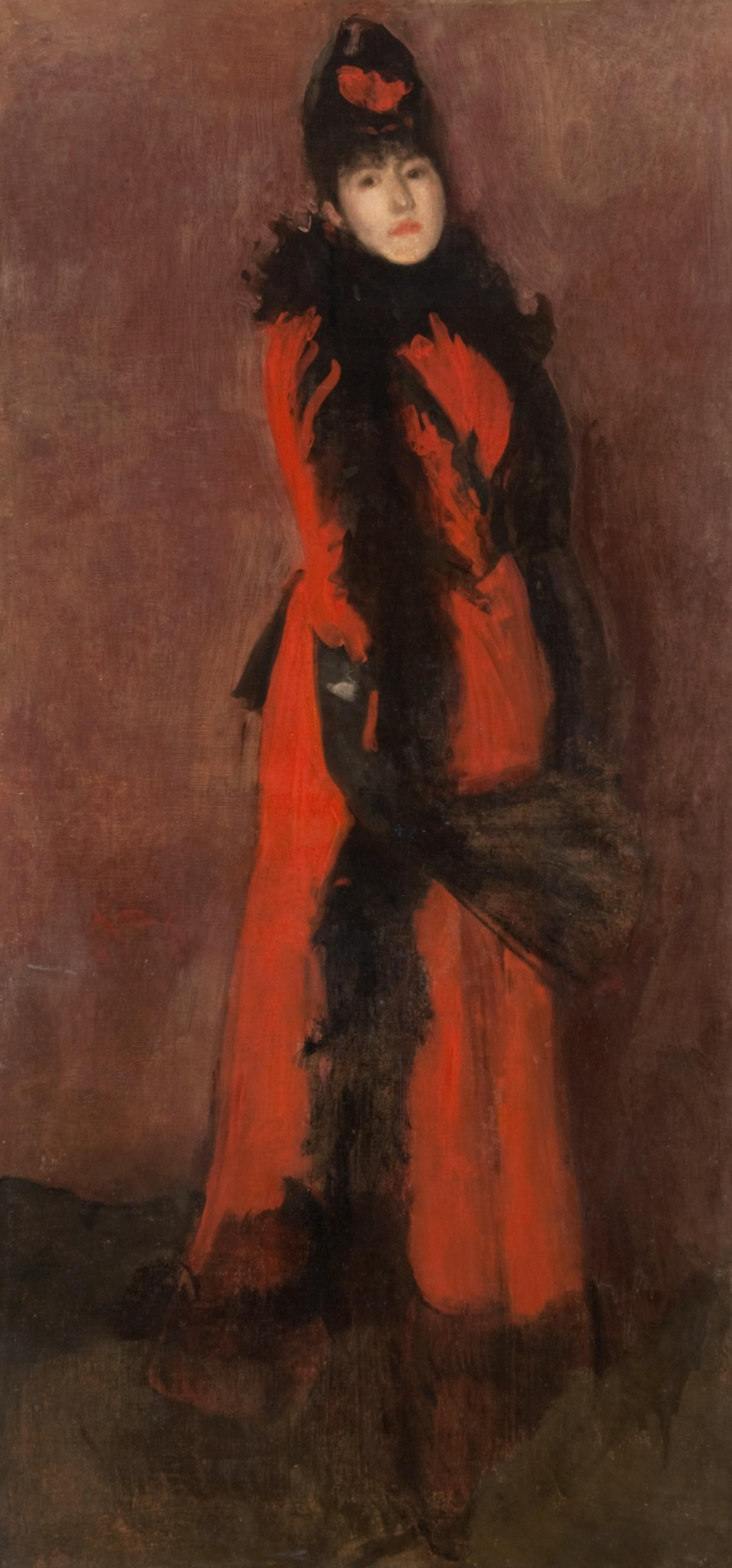
Red and Black: The Fan, 1891–94, Hunterian Art Gallery

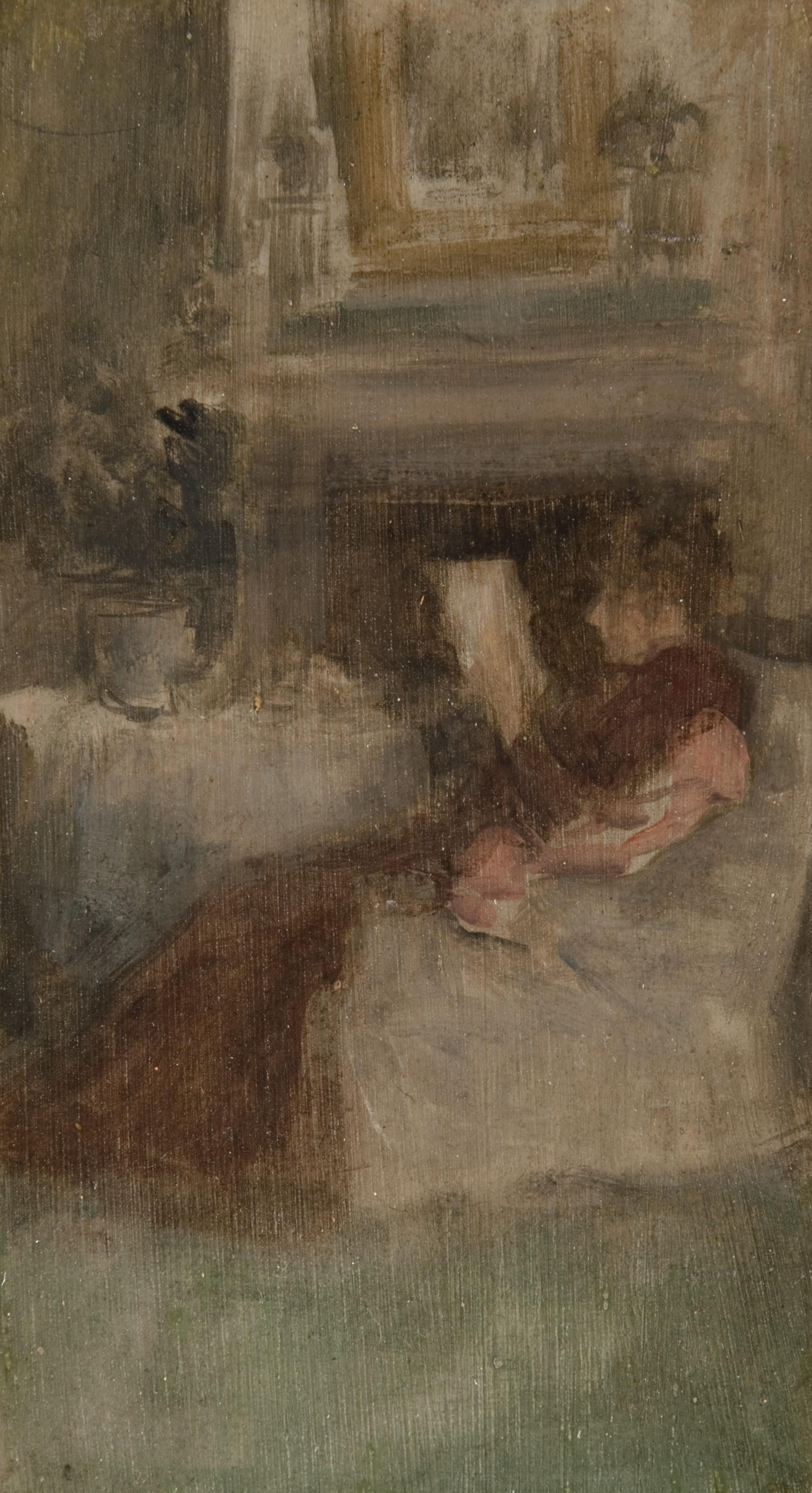
Miss Ethel Philip Reading, 1894, Hunterian Art Gallery

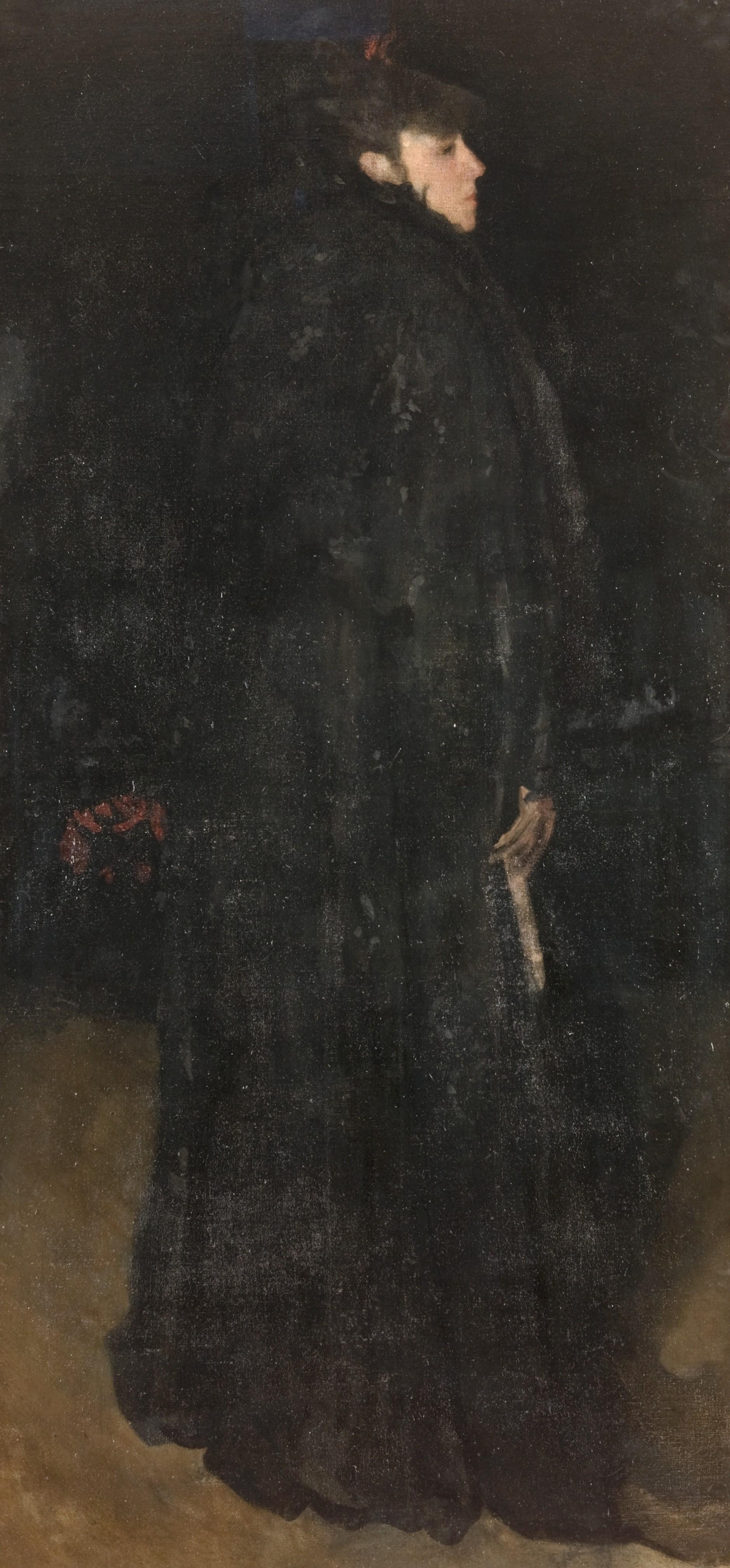
Harmony in Black: Miss Ethel Philip, c. 1894–96, Hunterian Art Gallery

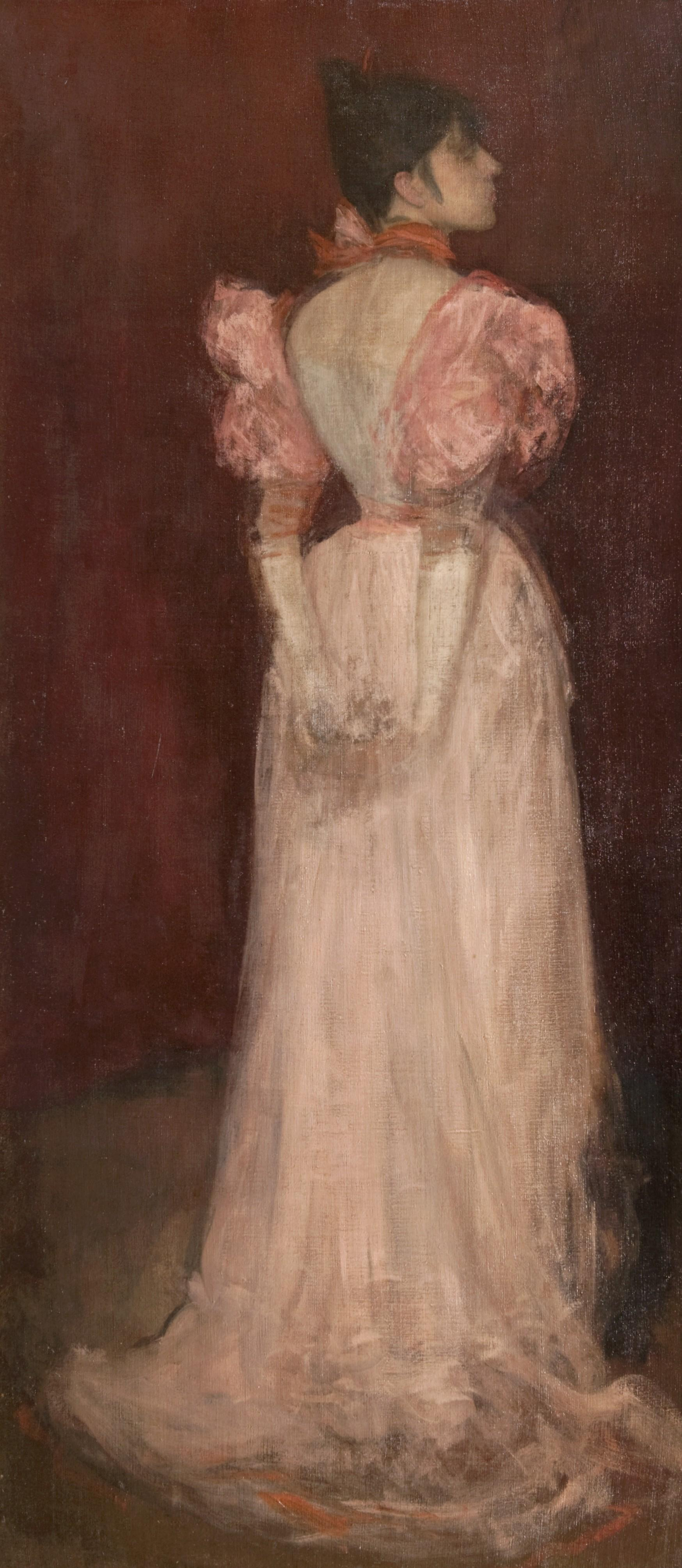
Rose et or: La Tulipe, 1894–96, Hunterian Art Gallery

Rose and Silver: Portrait of Mrs Whibley, 1895–96, Freer Gallery of Art
