= Rosalind Birnie Philip =

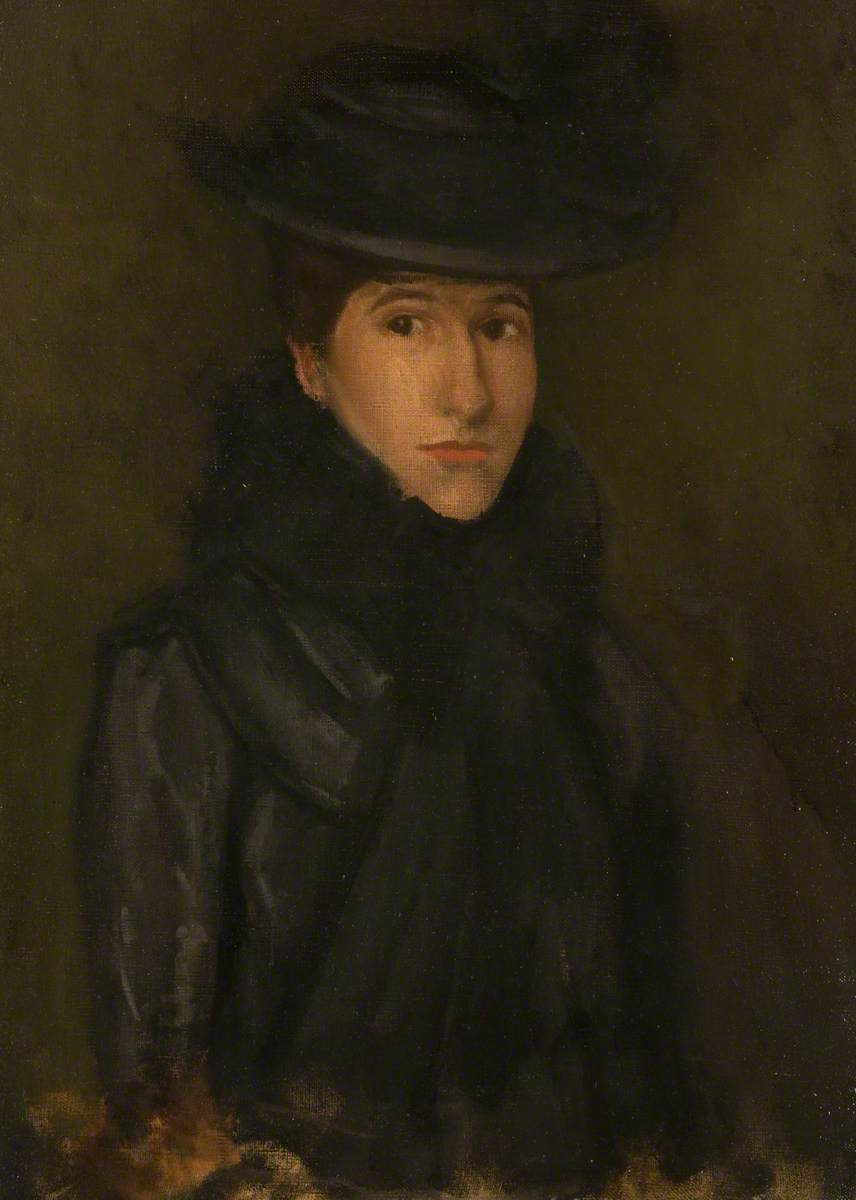
- The Black Hat by James McNeill Whistler (1900–1902)
- Born: 14 November 1873; Chelsea, London, England
- Died: 6 February 1958 (aged 84); Chelsea, London, England
- Occupations: Artist's model, secretary to James McNeill Whistler and executrix of his estate following his death
- Parent(s): John Birnie Philip and Frances Black

Rosalind Birnie Philip (14 November 1873 – 6 February 1958) was the sister-in-law of James McNeill Whistler. After the death of her sister Beatrice in 1896 Rosalind acted as secretary to Whistler and was appointed Whistler's sole beneficiary and the executrix in his will.

== Life ==
Rosalind Birnie Philip was born at Chelsea, London on 14 November 1873. She was the youngest of ten children of the sculptor John Birnie Philip and Frances Black.

Rosalind's sister Beatrice married James McNeill Whistler in 1888, following the death of her first husband Edward William Godwin. Her sister Ethel Whibley had been the secretary to Whistler from 1890 to 1894 before her marriage to the writer Charles Whibley. In Whistler's correspondence Beatrice Whistler was referred to a 'Trixie' or 'Chinkie', also 'Luck' and 'Wam'; her sister Ethel Whibley was 'Bunnie'; her brother-in-law Charles Whibley was 'Wobbles'; and Rosalind was referred to as the 'Major'; with Whistler signing family correspondence as the 'General' when he did not sign with his butterfly signature.

In 1896, when Rosalind was 22 years of age, Beatrice died of cancer. Whistler made her his ward and in his will she was appointed his executrix. She acted as his secretary and also modelled for Whistler. From 1902, she managed Whistler’s household in Chelsea which included Rosalind’s mother.

In 1900 Whistler’s publisher, William Heinemann, proposed to Whistler that he authorise a biography and Heinemann suggested William Ernest Henley, then Charles Whibley, neither of whom were acceptable to Whistler; although the Pennells, who were friends and admirers of Whistler, were accepted by Whistler as suitable biographers. Heinemann asked Joseph Pennell and Elizabeth Robins Pennell to write his biography. The biography was published as The Life of James McNeill Whistler (Philadelphia: J. B. Lippincott Co.; London: W. Heinemann, 1908), although Rosalind, as executor of Whistler’s estate, attempted to prevent its publication because she disapproved of the manuscript. Rosalind saw her role as being the guardian of Whistler's reputation. Her views about the Pennells' biography recalls Whistler's objection to biographers. Whistler had stated that he was "determined that no mendacious scamp shall tell the foolish truths about me."

== Bequest of Whistler’s collection ==
Following Whistler’s death in 1903 Rosalind inherited his estate. She continued to collect his letters and purchased prints to add to the collection of the works of Whistler. In 1938 she made the first gift to the Hunterian Museum and Art Gallery of the University of Glasgow, of major paintings of Whistler as well as prints, pastels and drawings. In 1955, she gifted the University a collection of Whistler’s correspondence and books. Following Rosalind’s death in 1958 the balance of her collection of Whistler’s paintings, works on paper and manuscripts and books went to the University.

== Rosalind as model ==
Rosalind appears in the following images:

Paintings

- The Black Hat – Miss Rosalind Birnie Philip (Y535), Rosalind is in three-quarter profile;
- The Jade Necklace: Portrait of Rosalind Birnie Philip (YSM 478);
- Miss Rosalind Birnie Philip standing (YMSM 479); also (YMSM 480; 553).

Drawings
Rosalind Birnie Philip (M1705).
Lithographs
(K71, 113; L189).
