= John Birnie Philip =

English sculptor

- Born: 23 November 1824; London, England
- Died: 2 March 1875 (aged 50); Chelsea, London, England
- Resting place: Brompton Cemetery, London; 51.483333°N 0.189167°W
- Education: Government School of Design, Somerset House
- Known for: Sculpture
- Spouse: Frances Black (1853–1875)
- Children: 10, including Beatrice, Ethel and Rosalind

John Birnie Philip (23 November 1824 – 2 March 1875) was a nineteenth-century English sculptor. Much of his work was carried out for the architect Sir George Gilbert Scott.

== Life ==
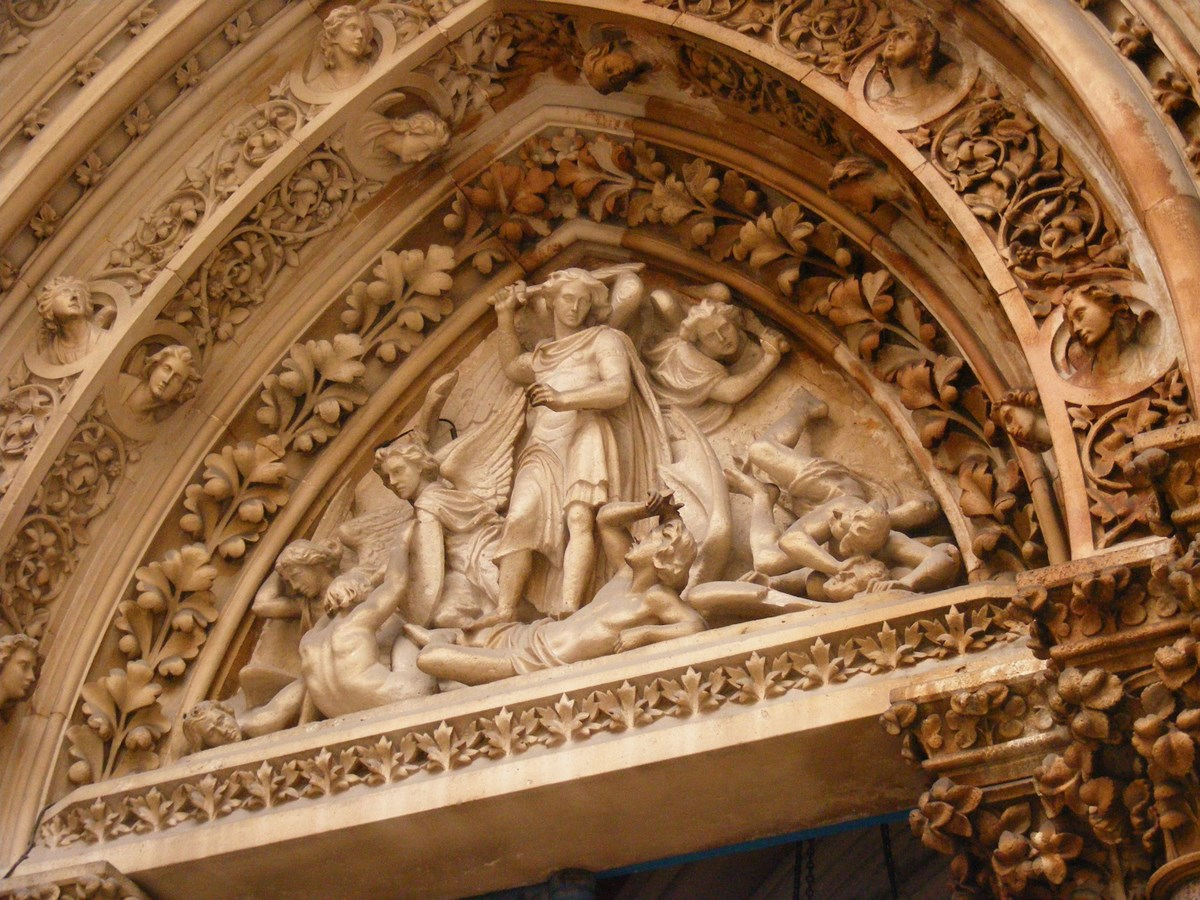
St Michael disputing with Satan (1858) at St Michael Cornhill

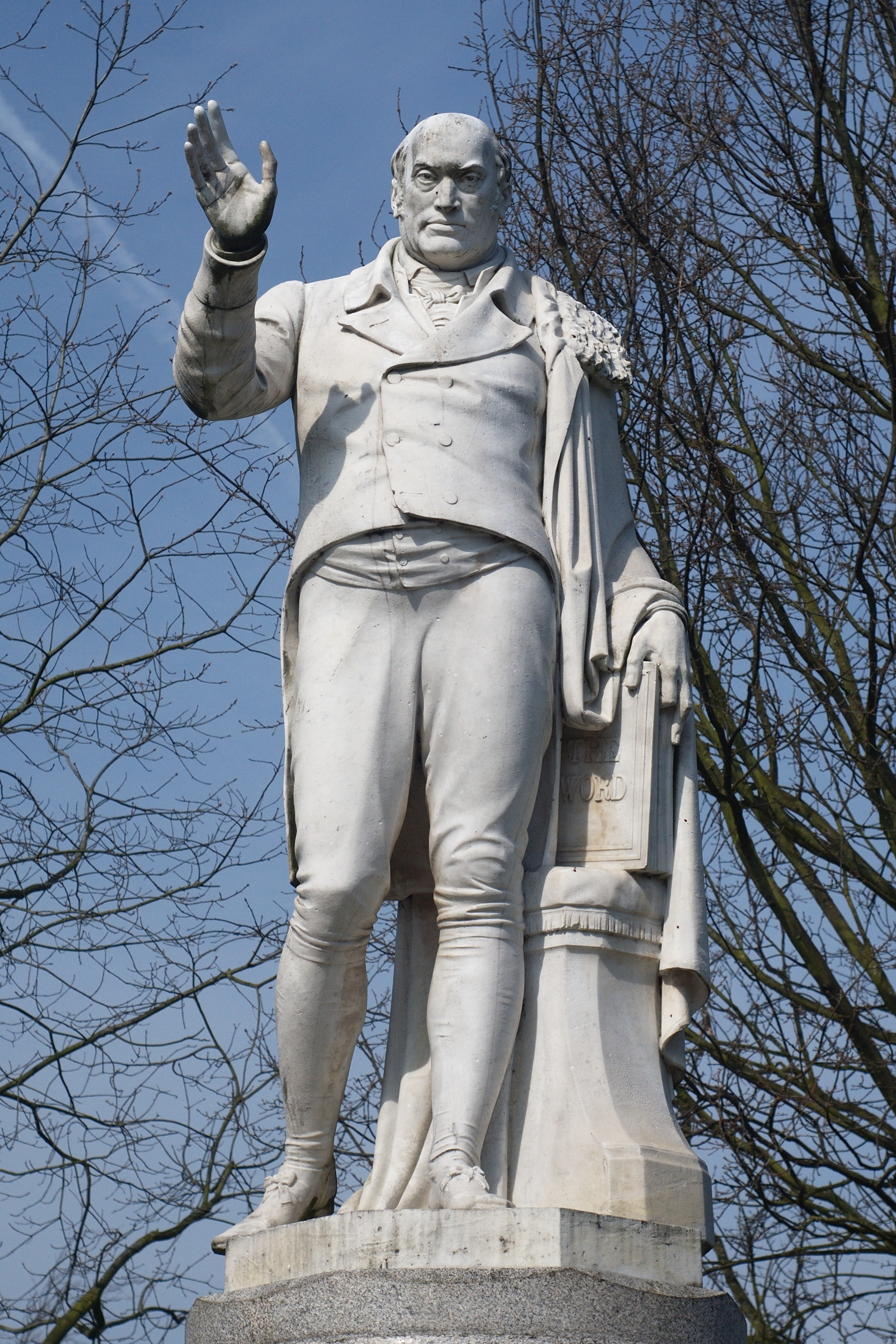
Statue of Robert Hall, by Philip, off New Walk, Leicester

Philip was born in London, the son of William and Elizabeth Philip. He studied at the Government School of Design at Somerset House in London under John Rogers Herbert, and then at Herbert's own newly opened school in Maddox Street. He went on to work in Augustus Pugin's wood carving workshop at the Palace of Westminster before setting up his own studio.

Much of Philip's work was commissioned for buildings by the Gothic Revival architect Sir George Gilbert Scott. At St Michael, Cornhill, in the City of London, he carved the decorations for the porch built by Scott as part of his Gothic embellishment of Wren's church. They included an elaborate tympanum sculpture depicting St Michael disputing with Satan, which he exhibited at the Royal Academy in 1858, his first work to be shown there. He did further carvings for the interior of the building.

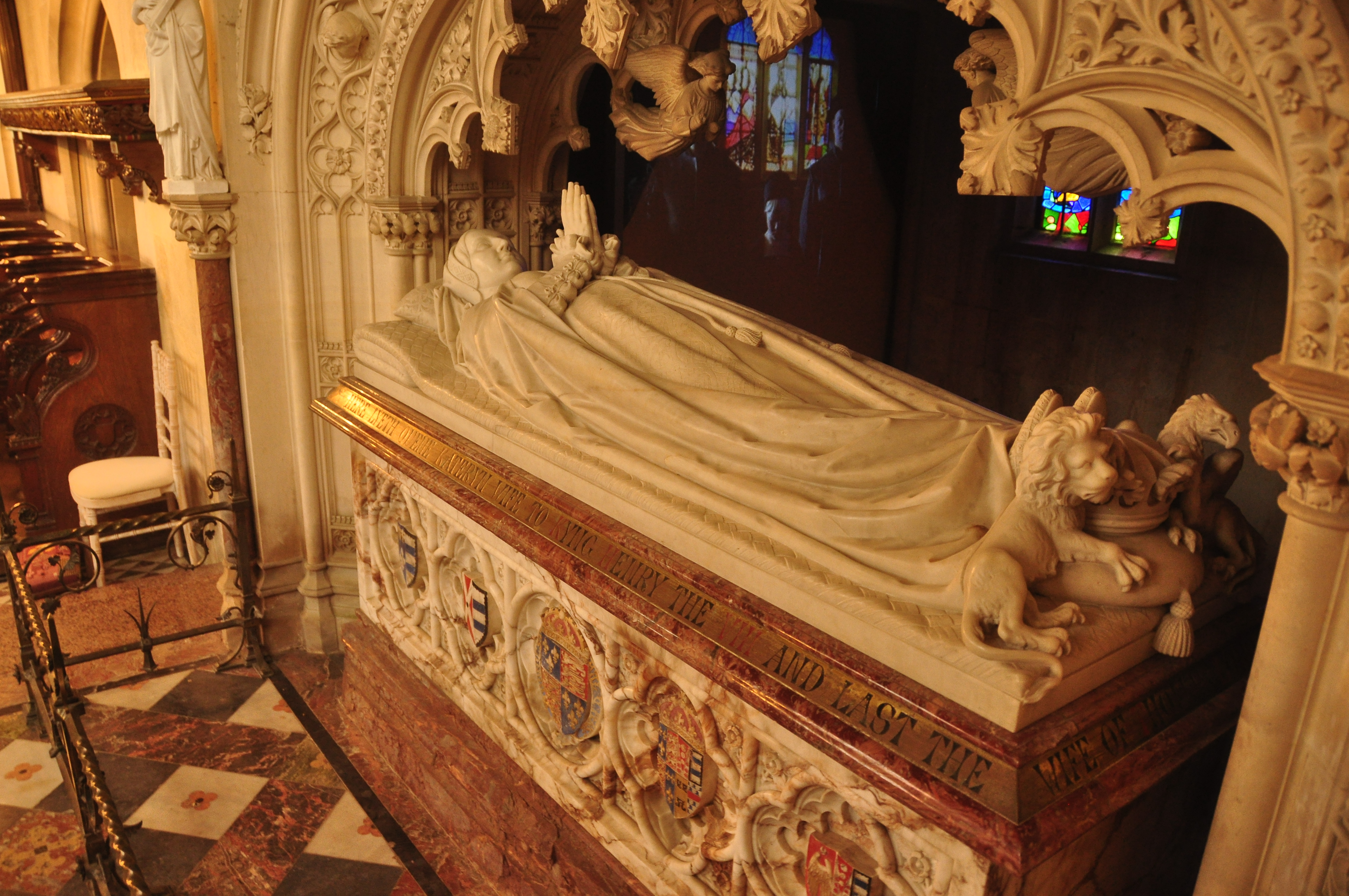
Tomb of Catherine Parr, 1863, designed by Gilbert Scott

As part of Scott's restoration of St Mary's chapel at Sudeley Castle, Philip made a font and reredos, and a white, life-size, marble effigy for the canopied tomb of Catherine Parr. The effigy was shown – unfinished – at the Royal Academy in 1859.

In 1863–64 Scott commissioned Philip, along with Henry Hugh Armstead (1828–1905), to make the podium frieze, the Frieze of Parnassus, on the Albert Memorial in Kensington Gardens. Philip carved the images of architects (including Scott himself) on the west side of the monument, and those of the sculptors on the north. As well as his work on the frieze, he modelled the bronze allegorical statues of Geometry, Philosophy, Geology and Physiology for niches on the western side of the canopy, and the gilt metal angels on the spire. At the time of the commission, Philip and Armstead were little known compared to the other sculptors working on the memorial. While carrying out this work, Philip lodged in the kitchen wing of The Pavilion, Sloane Place in Chelsea.

Elsewhere in London, Philip produced allegorical figures (including Art, Law and Commerce) for the front of Scott's Foreign and Commonwealth Office on Whitehall, eight figures of monarchs for the Royal Gallery in the Palace of Westminster (1868–69), a "young woman in classical drapery floating forward on a small cloud" for the Peace Drinking Fountain in West Smithfield Square (1870) and the decorations, depicting plants and birds, on the Portland stone capitals of the piers of Blackfriars Bridge. By 1870, Philip's success meant he could move into his own home and studio at Manresa Road, Chelsea.

In 1874, the year before his death, Philip was paid £312 for carving "the Relievos etc." on the entrance porch at the Royal Academy's Burlington House.

His works in churches and cathedrals include the reredoses for Ely Cathedral, St. George's Chapel, Windsor and Lichfield Cathedral, decorative work at Wakefield Cathedral, the tomb of Dean Lyall in Canterbury Cathedral and the tomb of Lt Col Willoughby Moore in York Minster. For the Victoria Memorial, Kolkata, in about 1864, Philip produced a bronze bust of Charlotte Canning, Countess Canning.

Often commissioned to make commemorative municipal works, Philip produced a bust of Richard Cobden for the Halifax Chamber of Commerce (1867), a statue of the humanitarian Richard Oastler, now situated in Northgate, Bradford, and one of the Reverend Robert Hall in De Montfort Square, Leicester.

His last work was the statue of Edward Akroyd, M.P., erected at Halifax. The work, in bronze, had been designed and partially modelled by Philip at the time of his death, and was completed by his assistant Ceccardo Egidio Fucigna. Much earlier, Philip had been responsible for the elaborate carving in Scott's church of All Souls, Haley Hill, Halifax, founded by Akroyd in 1856.

His apprentices included Thomas Stirling Lee.

== Family ==
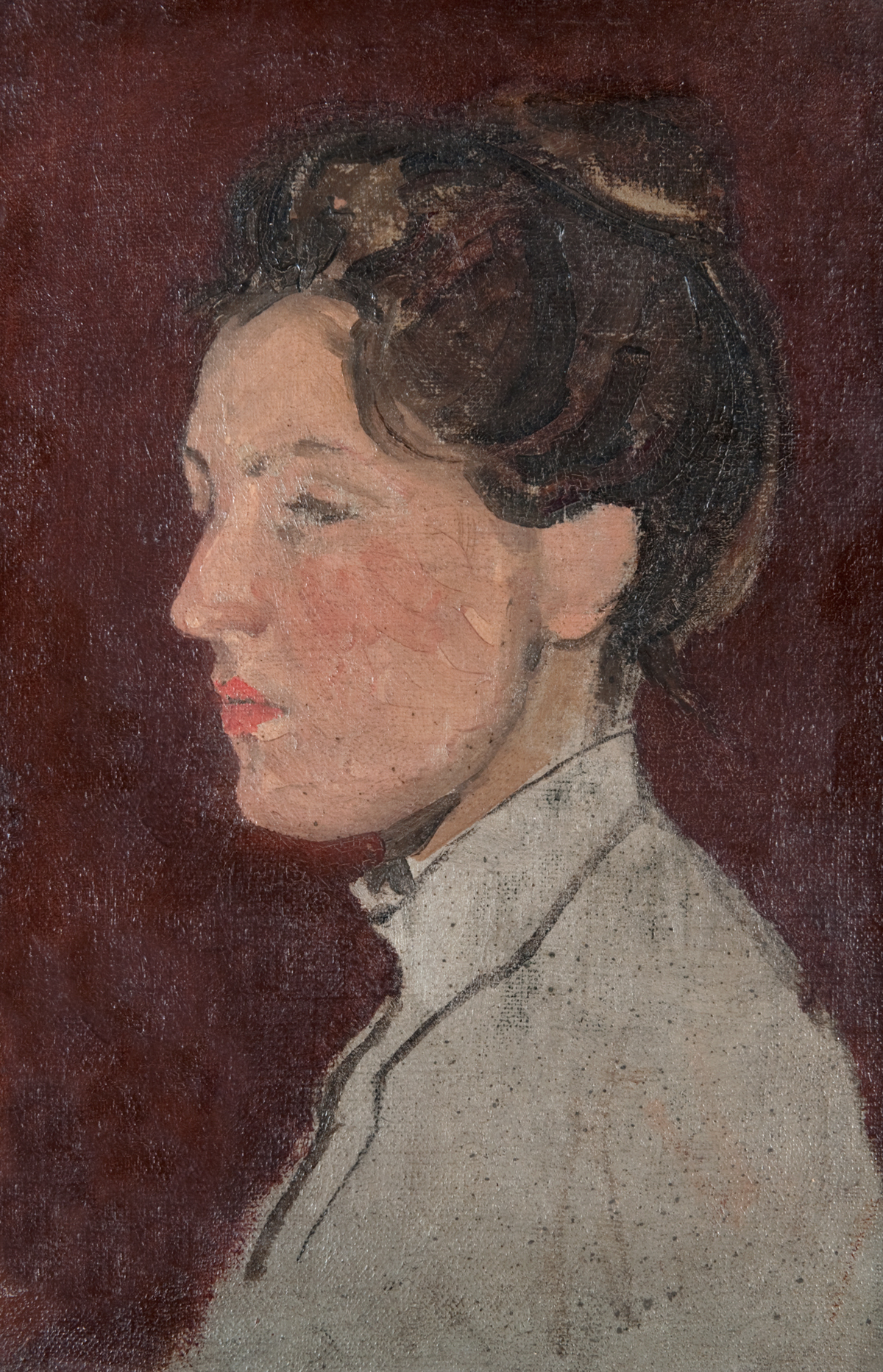
Frances Septima Birnie Philip by her sister Beatrice

Philip married Frances Black in 1853. They had ten children, including a daughter, Beatrice (also called 'Beatrix' or 'Trixie'), who married James McNeill Whistler in 1888. Their daughter Ethel married the writer Charles Whibley. Birnie's youngest daughter Rosalind Birnie Philip acted as Whistler's companion, secretary and house-keeper after Beatrice's death, and was appointed his executrix. From December 1900 to February 1901 Birnie's son Ronald accompanied Whistler on a trip to the Morocco, Algiers and Corsica. Beatrice, Ronald, Ethel and Rosalind all modelled for him at various times, as did their mother Frances. His eldest daughter, Constance (1854–1929), married the artist Cecil Gordon Lawson.

== Death ==
Philip died of bronchitis at his home, Merton Villa, King's Road, Chelsea on 2 March 1875, and was buried in Brompton Cemetery.
