= Charles Whibley =

English literary journalist and author

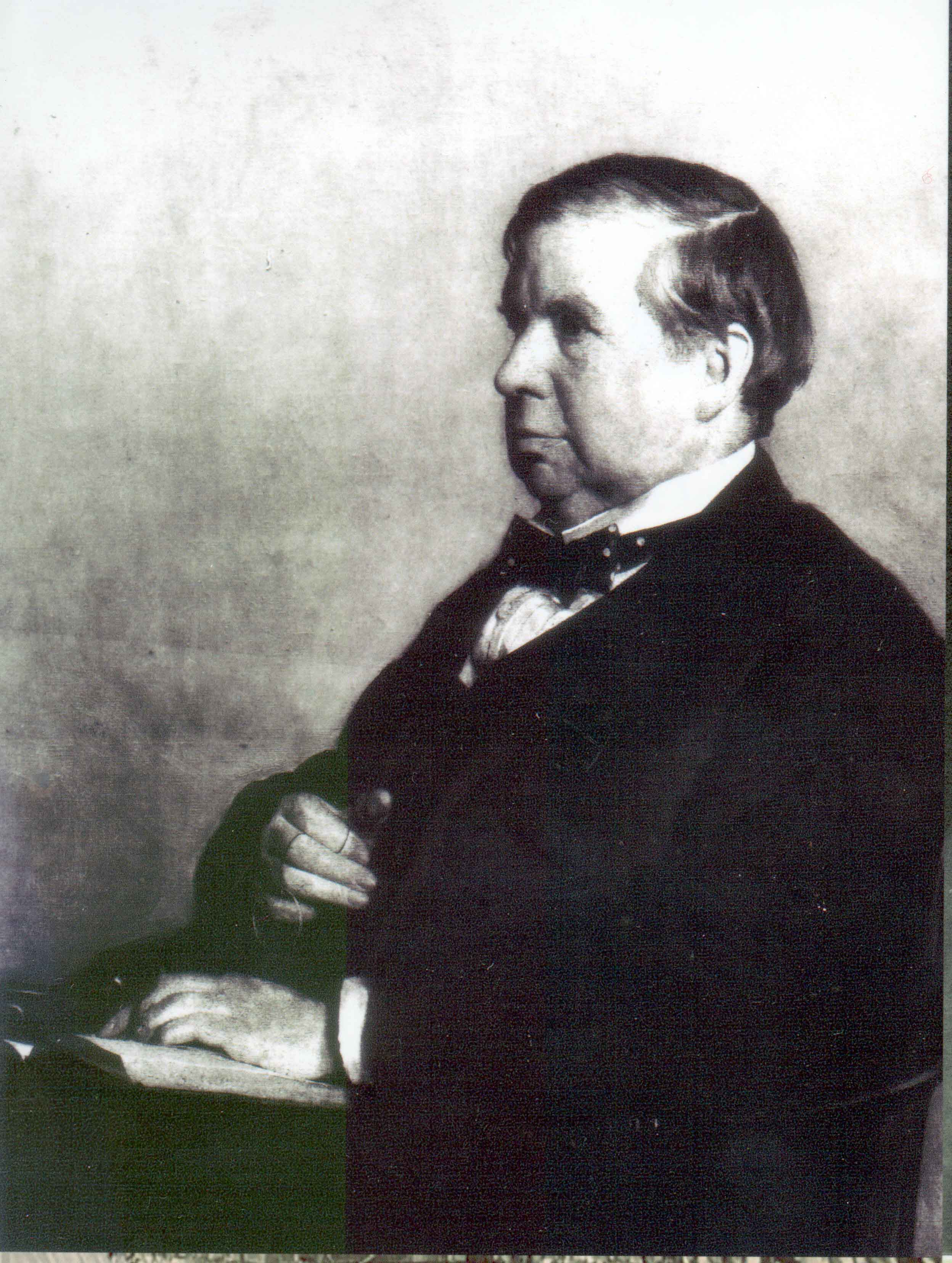
- Charles Whibley, English writer and journalist
- Born: 9 December 1859; Sittingbourne, Kent, England
- Died: 4 March 1930 (aged 70); Hyères, France
- Occupations: Writer and journalist
- Spouse(s): Ethel Birnie Philip (1896–1920); Philippa Raleigh (1927–1930)
- Parent(s): Ambrose Whibley and Mary Jean Davy

Charles Whibley (9 December 1859 – 4 March 1930) was an English literary journalist and author. In literature and the arts, his views were progressive. He supported James Abbott McNeill Whistler (they had married sisters). He also recommended T. S. Eliot to Geoffrey Faber, which resulted in Eliot's being appointed as an editor at Faber and Gwyer. Eliot's essay Charles Whibley (1931) was contained within his Selected Essays, 1917-1932. Whibley's style was described by Matthew as "often acerbic high Tory commentary".

== Early life ==
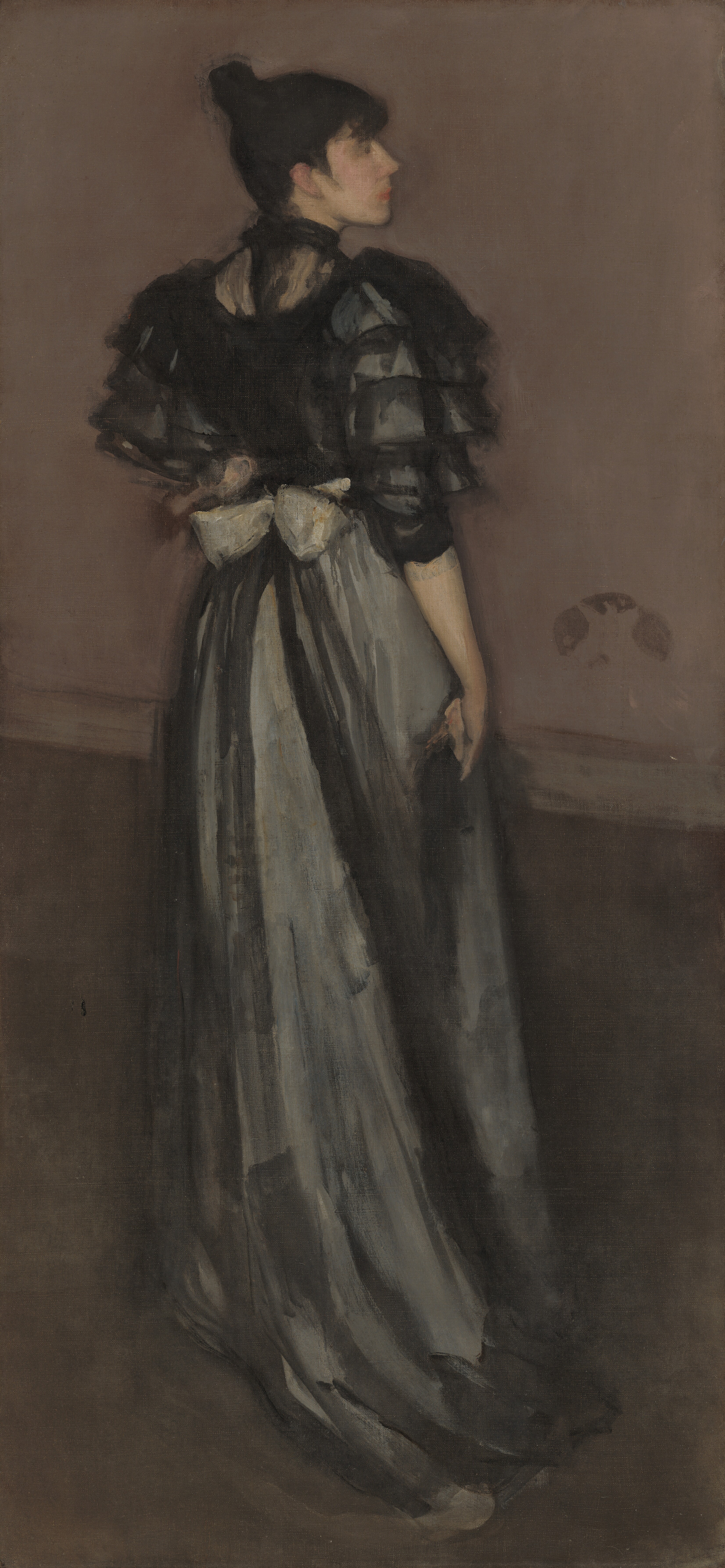
Mother of Pearl and Silver: The Andalusian (1888–1900), National Gallery of Art, Washington, D.C.

Whibley was born 9 December 1859 at Sittingbourne, Kent, England. His parents were Ambrose Whibley, silk mercer, and his second wife, Mary Jean Davy. He was educated at Bristol Grammar School and Jesus College, Cambridge, where he took a first in classics in 1883.

Charles Whibley's immediate family included his brother Leonard Whibley, who was Fellow of Pembroke College, Cambridge, from 1899 to 1910, and a lecturer in classics (Ancient History). Charles also had a half-brother, Fred Whibley, copra trader, on Niutao, Ellice Islands (now Tuvalu), and a half-sister, Eliza Elenor, who was the wife of John T. Arundel, the owner of J. T. Arundel & Co. which evolved into Pacific Islands Company and later the Pacific Phosphate Company, which commenced phosphate mining in Nauru and Banaba Island (Ocean Island).

Whibley worked for three years in the editorial department of Cassell & Co, publishers. He shared a house with his brother Leonard Whibley, William Ernest Henley, and George Warrington Steevens.

== Life in Paris ==
In 1894 Whibley became the Paris correspondent for the Pall Mall Gazette. This Tory evening paper conformed with Whibley's conservative political views.

In Paris Whibley moved in symbolist circles with Stéphane Mallarmé, Marcel Schwob, and Paul Valéry. He was a witness at the wedding of Marcel Schwob and Marguerite Moreno in England on 12 September 1900.

== Marriage to Ethel Birnie Philip ==
In 1896 Charles married Ethel Birnie Philip in the garden of the house occupied by James McNeill Whistler at n° 110 Rue du Bac, Paris. The photographs of the wedding were taken by Louis Edmond Vallois, who had a studio at 99 rue de Rennes, Paris. Ethel Birnie Philip was the daughter of the sculptor John Birnie Philip and Frances Black. Before her marriage Ethel Whibley worked during 1893–4 as secretary to James McNeill Whistler. Whistler painted a number of full-length portraits of Ethel Whibley, including Mother of Pearl and Silver: The Andalusian, and portraits and sketches of her titled as Miss Ethel Philip or Mrs Ethel Whibley.

Hartrick (1939) describes Whibley as "an obviously English type, and therefore something of a red rag to Whistler". As the brother-in-law of James McNeill Whistler, Whibley was part of Whistler's intimate family circle, referred to as "Wobbles" in Whistler's correspondence. On one occasion Whistler mocked Whibley for describing himself as "something of a boulevardier" during his time in Paris. In 1897 Whistler created the cover design for Whibley's volume of essays A Book of Scoundrels.

== Later career as a writer ==
Whibley's wife, Ethel, died in 1920, and in 1927 Charles married Philippa Raleigh, the daughter of Walter Raleigh, Chair of English Literature at Oxford University.

Whibley contributed to the London and Edinburgh magazines, including The Pall Mall Magazine, Macmillan's Magazine, and Blackwood's Magazine. As a writer on Blackwood's Magazine, he was a prominent conservative columnist, as well as an influential literary figure, recruited by its editor William Blackwood III.

In the years 1924–1927 Whibley edited the Second Series of the Tudor Translations book series published by Constable & Co. and Alfred A. Knopf. In 1927 he edited the Little Books series for Peter Davies.

He was a persistent critic of the system of state education.

It was an open secret that Whibley contributed anonymously, to the Blackwood's Magazine, his Musings without Methods for over twenty-five years. T. S. Eliot described them as "the best sustained piece of literary journalism that I know of in recent times". Whibley was friends with William Ernest Henley and contributed to the Scots Observer (published in Edinburgh) and also to the National Observer (published in London) under Henley's editorship.

Whibley died on 4 March 1930 at Hyères, France, and his body was buried at Great Brickhill, Buckinghamshire.

A portrait of Charles Whibley (1925–26), by Sir G. Kelly, is held by Jesus College, Cambridge. A sketch of Charles Whibley is held by the National Portrait Gallery, London.

== Works ==
- A Collection of Letters of W. M. Thackeray 1847~1855 (1887)
- Cathedrals of England and Wales and Their History (1888)
- In Cap and Gown: Three Centuries Of Cambridge Wit (1889) editor
- A Book of English Prose, Character and Incident 1387~1649 (1894) with W. E. Henley
- A Book of Scoundrels (1897)
- Studies in Frankness (1898)
- The Pageantry of Life (1900)
- Musings Without Method: A Record of 1900~1901 (1902)
- William Makepeace Thackeray (1903)
- Literary Portraits (1904)
- American Sketches (1908)
- The Letters of an Englishman (1911) published anonymously
- The Letters of an Englishman, Second Series (1912) published anonymously
- Essays in Biography (1913)
- Jonathan Swift (1917) The Leslie Stephen Lecture, University of Cambridge, 26 May 1917
- Political Portraits (1917)
- Literary Studies (1919)
- Political Portraits, Second Series (1923)
- Collected Essays of W. P. Ker (1925) editor
- Lord John Manners and His Friends (1925) Volumes I & II
- Apuleius: The Golden Ass (1927)
- The Satyricon of Petronius Arbiter (1927) with W. C. Firebaugh

Project Gutenberg publishes online editions of American Sketches and A Book of Scoundrels

== Literature ==
- Stephen Donovan, The Muse of Blackwood's: Charles Whibley and Literary Criticism in the World, in David Finkelstein (editor), Print Culture and the Blackwood Tradition (University of Toronto Press, 2006: Studies in Book and Print Culture series)
- Julie F. Codell, ed., Imperial Co-histories: National Identities and the British and Colonial Press (Fairleigh Dickinson University Press, 2003), p. 96.
- Paul Jordan-Smith, For the Love of Books: The Adventures of an Impecunious Collector, New York: Oxford University Press, 1934; reprinted: Freeport, NY: Books for Libraries Press, 1969, pp. 140–142 and 292–293.
