= List of paintings by James McNeill Whistler =

Extant paintings by American artist

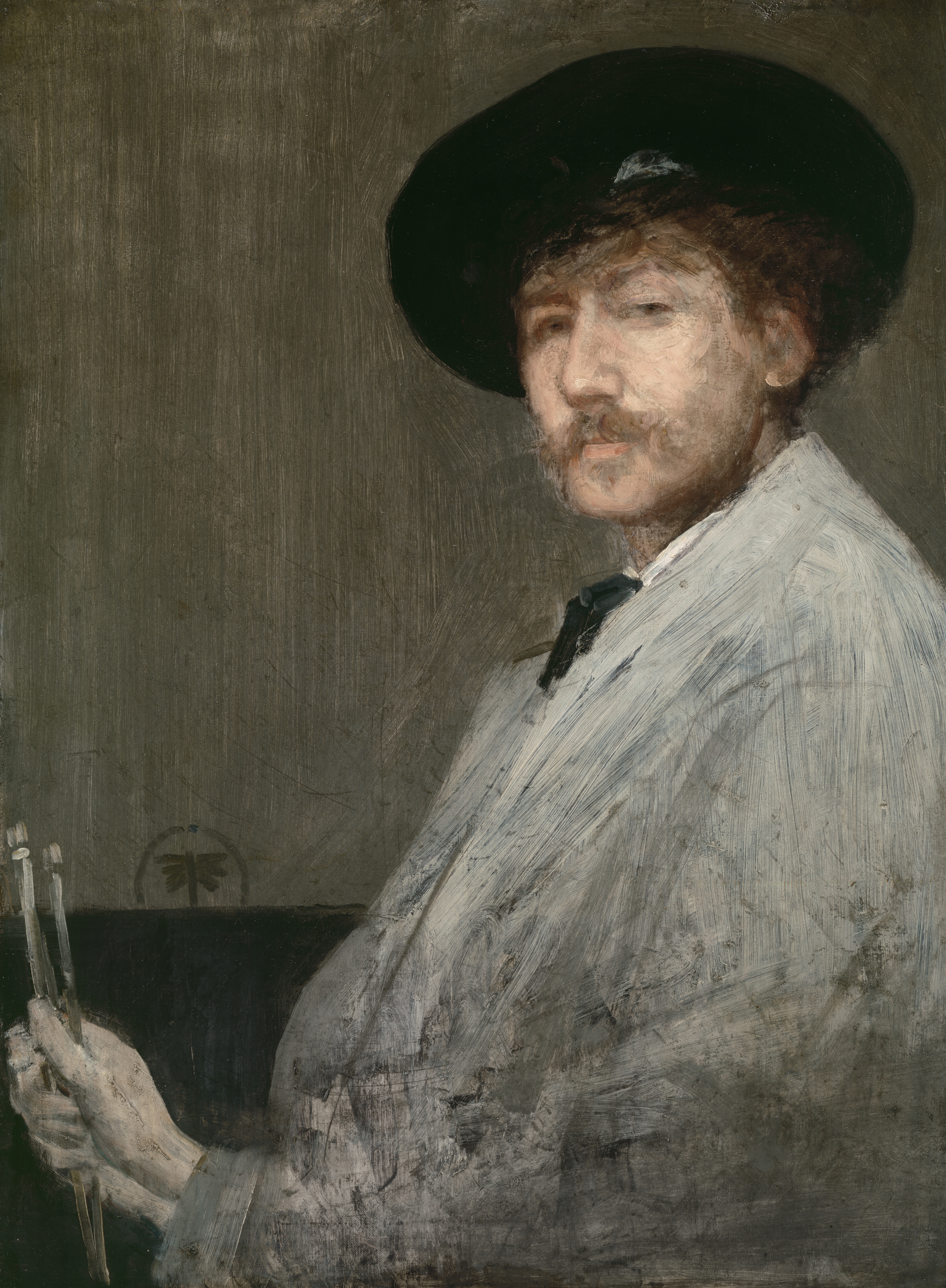
Arrangement in Gray: Portrait of the Painter (c. 1872)

American-born, British-based artist James McNeill Whistler (1834-1903) created some 550 works in oil during his lifetime, of which around 340 survive today. As a leader of the aesthetic movement and a founder of tonalism, Whistler had a profound effect on art in the 19th century and influenced many artists, particularly in America. Whistler was a proponent of the credo "art for art's sake" and sought to achieve, above all, tonal harmony in his works. Many of his paintings' titles contain musical terms such as symphony, nocturne, harmony, and arrangement, reflecting the parallels he found between his art and music.

Today, Whistler's works are held by a large number of institutions around the world with significant collections housed at the Freer Gallery, Hunterian Art Gallery, Harvard Art Museums, and Tate Britain. This list is based on the 2020 online catalog compiled by Margaret F. MacDonald and Grischka Petri which was developed from the 1980 catalogue raisonné by Andrew McLaren Young, Margaret F. MacDonald, Robin Spencer and Hamish Miles.

== Paintings ==
Image	Title	Date	Medium	Dimensions	Collection	Cat. no.	Ref.
	The Artist's Niece	1849	Oil on paper	8 x 7.5 cm	Hunterian Museum and Art Gallery, Glasgow	001	
	The Fishwife	1855	Oil on millboard	32.9 x 25.3 cm	Private collection	006	
	Whistler Smoking	1856–1860	Oil on panel	25.7 x 18.1 cm	Private collection	009	
	Copy after Ingres' 'Roger delivrant Angelique'	1857	Oil on canvas	82 x 53 cm	Hunterian Museum and Art Gallery, Glasgow	011	
	Vision of Saint Luke (copy of Jules-Claude Ziegler)	1857	Oil on canvas	92 x 68 cm	Hunterian Museum and Art Gallery, Glasgow	015	
	Copy after a Snow Scene	1857–1858	Oil on canvas	91.5 x 61 cm	Colby College Museum of Art, Maine	017	
	Head of a Peasant Woman	1855–1858	Oil on panel	25.9 x 18 cm	Hunterian Museum and Art Gallery, Glasgow	021	
	Interior	1858	Oil on panel	39.3 x 29.8 cm	Private collection	022	
	Rue des Buttes (Montmartre) (Note: Attribution to Whistler disputed)	1859	Oil on canvas	67.6 x 100.3 cm	Worcester Art Museum, Massachusetts	022a	
	Portrait of Whistler with a Hat	1858	Oil on canvas	46.3 x 38.1 cm	Freer Gallery of Art, Washington, D.C.	023	
	At the Piano	1858	Oil on canvas	67 x 90.5 cm	Taft Museum of Art, Ohio	024	
	Head of an Old Man Smoking	1859	Oil on canvas	41 x 33 cm	Musée d'Orsay, Paris	025	
	La Mère Gérard	1858–1859	Oil on millboard	30.5 x 22.2 cm	Colby College Museum of Art, Maine	026	
	La Mère Gérard	1858	Oil on panel	24.1 x 17.8 cm	Washington County Museum of Fine Arts, Maryland	027	
	Portrait of Major Whistler (Note: Attribution and date uncertain, possibly by Chester Harding)	1857–1859	Oil on panel	31.3 x 25.1 cm	Freer Gallery of Art, Washington, D.C.	029	
	Portrait of Lucas Alexander Ionides	1860	Oil on canvas	40.6 x 30.4 cm	Private collection	032	
	Brown and Silver: Old Battersea Bridge	1859–1863	Oil on canvas	63.8 x 76 cm	Addison Gallery of American Art, Massachusetts	033	
	Harmony in Green and Rose: The Music Room	1860	Oil on canvas	96.3 x 71.7 cm	Freer Gallery of Art, Washington, D.C.	034	
	Wapping	1861	Oil on canvas	71.1 x 101.6 cm	National Gallery of Art, Washington, D.C.	035	
	The Thames in Ice	1860	Oil on canvas	74.6 x 55.3 cm	Freer Gallery of Art, Washington, D.C.	036	
	The Coast of Brittany (Alone with the Tide)	1861	Oil on canvas	87.3 x 115.6 cm	Wadsworth Atheneum Museum of Art, Connecticut	037	
	Symphony in White, No. 1: The White Girl	1860	Oil on canvas	213 x 107.9 cm	National Gallery of Art, Washington, D.C.	038	
	The Last of Old Westminster	1862	Oil on canvas	60.96 x 78.1 cm	Museum of Fine Arts Boston, Massachusetts	039	
	The Blue Wave, Biarritz	1862	Oil on canvas	61 x 87.6 cm	Hill-Stead Museum, Connecticut	041	
	A White Note	1862	Oil on canvas	14.5 x 12.5 in	Colby College Museum of Art, Maine	044	
	Battersea Reach	1863	Oil on canvas	50.8 x 76.36 cm	National Gallery of Art, Washington, D.C.	045	
	Grey and Silver: Old Battersea Reach	1863	Oil on canvas	50.8 x 68.6 cm	Art Institute of Chicago, Illinois	046	
	Purple and Rose: The Lange Leizen of the Six Marks	1864	Oil on canvas	93.4 x 61.3 cm	Philadelphia Museum of Art, Pennsylvania	047	
	Sketch for Rose and Silver: La Princesse du Pays de la Porcelaine	1863–1864	Oil on fiberboard	62.8 x 34 cm	Worcester Art Museum, Massachusetts	049	
	The Princess from the Land of Porcelain	1863–1865	Oil on canvas	201.5 x 116.1 cm	Freer Gallery of Art, Washington, D.C.	050	
	Arrangement in Flesh Colour and Grey: The Chinese Screen (Note: Attribution unclear, possibly by Walter Greaves)	1863–1879	Oil on canvas	50.8 x 30.5 cm	Private collection	051	
	Symphony in White, No. 2: The Little White Girl	1864	Oil on canvas	76.5 x 51.1 cm	Tate Britain, London	052	
	Chelsea in Ice	1864	Oil on canvas	17.75 x 24 in	Colby College Museum of Art, Maine	053	
	Grey and Silver: Chelsea Wharf	1864	Oil on canvas	61 x 46 cm	National Gallery of Art, Washington, D.C.	054	
	Battersea Reach from Lindsey Houses	1864–1871	Oil on canvas	51.3 x 76.5 cm	Hunterian Museum and Art Gallery, Glasgow	055	
	Variations in Flesh Colour and Green—The Balcony	1864	Oil on panel	61.4 x 48.8 cm	Freer Gallery of Art, Washington, D.C.	056	
	Sketch for 'The Balcony'	1867–1870	Oil on panel	61 x 48.2 cm	Hunterian Museum and Art Gallery, Glasgow	057	
	Study of Draped Figures	1864–1865	Oil on canvas	39.7 x 57.5 cm	Hunterian Museum and Art Gallery, Glasgow	058	
	Caprice in Purple and Gold: The Golden Screen	1864	Oil on panel	50.1 x 68.5 cm	Freer Gallery of Art, Washington, D.C.	060	
	Symphony in White, No. 3	1865–1867	Oil on canvas	51.4 x 76.9 cm	Barber Institute of Fine Arts, Birmingham	061	
	The Artist's Studio	1865	Oil on canvas	62.2 x 46.3 cm	Hugh Lane Gallery, Dublin	062	
	The Artist in His Studio	1865–1866	Oil on paper on panel	62.9 x 46.4 cm	Art Institute of Chicago, Illinois	063	
	Harmony in Blue and Silver: Trouville	1865	Oil on canvas	50 x 76 cm	Isabella Stewart Gardner Museum, Massachusetts	064	
	Sea and Rain	1865	Oil on canvas	53.02 x 73.34 cm	University of Michigan Museum of Art, Michigan	065	
	Blue and Silver: Trouville	1865	Oil on millboard	59.3 x 72.8 cm	Freer Gallery of Art, Washington, D.C.	066	
	Crepuscule in Opal, Trouville	1865	Oil on canvas	13.75 x 18.125 in	Toledo Museum of Art, Ohio	067	
	Symphonie en argent et émeraude (Note: Attribution to Whistler uncertain)	1865–1868	Oil on canvas	50 x 73 cm	Private collection	068	
	Green and Grey. Channel	1865	Oil on canvas	52.7 x 95.9 cm	Montclair Art Museum, New Jersey	069	
	Trouville (Grey and Green, the Silver Sea)	1865	Oil on canvas	51.5 x 76.9 cm	Art Institute of Chicago, Illinois	070	
	Nocturne, The Solent	1866	Oil on canvas	50.2 x 91.5 cm	Gilcrease Museum, Oklahoma	071	
	Symphony in Grey and Green The Ocean	1866	Oil on canvas	80.7 x 101.9 cm	The Frick Collection, New York	072	
	Crepuscule in Flesh Colour and Green: Valparaiso	1866	Oil on canvas	75.9 x 58.6 cm	Tate Britain, London	073	
	Valparaiso Harbor	1866	Oil on canvas	76.6 x 51.1 cm	Smithsonian American Art Museum, Washington, D.C.	074	
	The Morning after the Revolution: Valparaiso	1866	Oil on canvas	76.5 x 63.9 cm	Hunterian Museum and Art Gallery, Glasgow	075	
	Nocturne in Blue and Gold: Valparaiso	1866	Oil on canvas	76.4 x 50.7 cm	Freer Gallery of Art, Washington, D.C.	076	
	Annabel Lee	1869–1897	Oil on canvas	105.5 x 50.7 cm	Hunterian Museum and Art Gallery, Glasgow	079	
	Sketch for 'Annabel Lee'	1869–1870	Oil on panel	30.7 x 22.6 cm	Hunterian Museum and Art Gallery, Glasgow	080	
	Venus	1868	Oil on millboard	61.9 x 45.6 cm	Freer Gallery of Art, Washington, D.C.	082	
	Symphony in Green and Violet	1868	Oil on millboard mounted on panel	61.9 x 45.8 cm	Freer Gallery of Art, Washington, D.C.	083	
	Variations in Blue and Green	1868	Oil on millboard mounted on panel	46.9 x 61.8 cm	Freer Gallery of Art, Washington, D.C.	084	
	Symphony in White and Red	1868	Oil on millboard mounted on panel	46.8 x 61.8 cm	Freer Gallery of Art, Washington, D.C.	085	
	Symphony in Blue and Pink	1868	Oil on millboard mounted on panel	46.7 x 61.8 cm	Freer Gallery of Art, Washington, D.C.	086	
	The White Symphony: Three Girls	1868	Oil on panel	46.4 x 61.6 cm	Freer Gallery of Art, Washington, D.C.	087	
	Three Figures: Pink and Grey	1868–1878	Oil on canvas	185.4 x 139.1 cm	Tate Britain, London	089	
	Young Girl with Cherry Blossom	1867–1872	Oil on canvas	139.2 x 73.7 cm	on long-term loan to the Courtauld Gallery, London	090	
	Harmony in Flesh Colour and Red	1869	oil and wax crayon on canvas	39.69 x 35.56 cm	Museum of Fine Arts Boston, Massachusetts	091	
	Sketch of a Figure with Flowers and Japanese Fans	1869–1873	Oil on canvas	31 x 17.5 cm	Maier Museum of Art at Randolph College, Virginia	092	
	Venus Rising from the Sea	1868–1873	Oil on canvas	59.8 x 49.1 cm	Freer Gallery of Art, Washington, D.C.	093	
	Study in Grey for the Portrait of F. R. Leyland	1870–1873	Oil on canvas	30.5 x 21 cm	Colby College Museum of Art, Maine	095	
	Arrangement in Black: Portrait of F. R. Leyland	1870	Oil on canvas	218.5 x 119.4 cm	Freer Gallery of Art, Washington, D.C.	097	
	Symphony in Grey: Early Morning, Thames	1871	Oil on canvas	100 x 79.7 cm	Freer Gallery of Art, Washington, D.C.	098	
	Nocturne: Blue and Silver—Bognor	1871	Oil on canvas	50.3 x 80.3 cm	Freer Gallery of Art, Washington, D.C.	100	
	Whistler's Mother	1871	Oil on canvas	144.3 x 163 cm	Musée d'Orsay, Paris	101	
	Nocturne: Blue and Silver – Chelsea	1871	Oil on panel	50.2 x 60.8 cm	Tate Britain, London	103	
	Variations in Violet and Green	1871	Oil on canvas	61.5 x 36 cm	Musée d'Orsay, Paris	104	
	Variations in Pink and Grey: Chelsea	1871–1872	Oil on canvas	62.7 x 40.5 cm	Freer Gallery of Art, Washington, D.C.	105	
	Symphony in Flesh Colour and Pink: Portrait of Mrs Frances Leyland	1871–1874	Oil on canvas	195.9 x 102.2 cm	The Frick Collection, New York	106	
	Miss Florence Leyland	1873	Oil on canvas		Portland Museum of Art, Maine	107	
	The Blue Girl (fragment): Yellow and Blue	1873–1875	Oil on canvas mounted on panel	76.5 x 22 cm	Freer Gallery of Art, Washington, D.C.	111	
	The Blue Girl (fragment): Purple and Blue	1873–1875	Oil on canvas mounted on panel	76.8 x 22 cm	Freer Gallery of Art, Washington, D.C.	111	
	Nocturne in Blue and Silver	1871–1872	Oil on panel	44.4 x 60.3 cm	Fogg Museum (Harvard), Massachusetts	113	
	Thames Nocturne	1872	Oil on canvas	18.25 x 30.25 in	Indianapolis Museum of Art, Indiana	114	
	Nocturne: Blue and Silver - Cremorne Lights	1872	Oil on canvas	74.3 x 50.2 cm	Tate Britain, London	115	
	Nocturne: Blue and Gold—Southampton Water	1872	Oil on canvas	50.5 x 76 cm	Art Institute of Chicago, Illinois	117	
	Nocturne: Blue and Silver—Battersea Reach	1870	Oil on canvas	49.9 x 72.3 cm	Freer Gallery of Art, Washington, D.C.	119	
	Nocturne: Battersea	1872–1875	Oil on canvas	49.5 x 106.5 cm	Biltmore Estate, North Carolina	120	
	Grey and Silver: The Thames	1896	Oil on canvas	61.3 x 46.1 cm	Hunterian Museum and Art Gallery, Glasgow	121	
	Arrangement in Gray: Portrait of the Painter	1872	Oil on canvas	74.9 x 53.3 cm	Detroit Institute of Arts, Michigan	122	
	Portrait of Dr. William McNeill Whistler	1871–1873	Oil on panel	43.7 x 34.8 cm	Art Institute of Chicago, Illinois	123	
	Self-Portrait	1893–1896	Oil on canvas	70 x 55.3 cm	Freer Gallery of Art, Washington, D.C.	124	
	Arrangement in Black, No. 2: Portrait of Mrs Louis Huth	1872–1873	Oil on canvas	190.5 x 99 cm	Private collection	125	
	Harmony in White and Blue (Note: Attribution to Whistler uncertain, possibly by Walter Greaves)	1870	Oil on canvas	209.5 x 87.5 cm	Leeds Art Gallery, Leeds	126	
	Symphony in White: Girl in Muslin Dress (Note: Attribution to Whistler and date disputed)	1870–1880	Oil on canvas	76 x 62 cm	Singer Laren, Laren	126b	
	Miss May Alexander	1873	Oil on canvas	101.6 x 192.4 cm	Tate Britain, London	127	
	Study for the Head of Miss Cicely H. Alexander	1872–1873	Oil on canvas	47.6 x 36.8 cm	Private collection	128	
	Harmony in Grey and Green: Miss Cicely Alexander	1872–1874	Oil on canvas	97.8 x 190.2 cm	Tate Britain, London	129	
	Harmony in Grey and Peach Colour	1872–1874	Oil on canvas	194 x 101 cm	Fogg Museum (Harvard), Massachusetts	131	
	Miss Maud Franklin	1872–1873	Oil on canvas	62.2 x 41 cm	Fogg Museum (Harvard), Massachusetts	132	
	Sketch for the Portrait of Carlyle (Note: Attribution to Whistler doubtful, likely by Walter Greaves)	1872–1873	Oil on canvas	36 x 51 cm	Private collection	133	
	Study for "Arrangement in Grey and Black, No. 2: Thomas Carlyle"	1872–1873	Oil on canvas	28.6 x 21 cm	Art Institute of Chicago, Illinois	135	
	Study for the Head of Carlyle	1872–1873	Oil on canvas	59.7 x 44.5 cm	Virginia Museum of Fine Arts, Virginia	136	
	Arrangement in Grey and Black, No. 2: Portrait of Thomas Carlyle	1872–1873	Oil on canvas	171 x 143.5 cm	Kelvingrove Art Gallery and Museum, Glasgow	137	
	Blue and Silver: Screen, with Old Battersea Bridge	1871–1872	distemper and oil on paper laid on canvas mounted to silk	195 x 182 cm	Hunterian Museum and Art Gallery, Glasgow	139	
	Nocturne: Blue and Gold – Old Battersea Bridge	1872	Oil on canvas	51.2 x 68.3 cm	Tate Britain, London	140	
	Nocturne: Westminster – Grey and Gold	1870	Oil on canvas	27.9 x 46.4 cm	Mississippi Museum of Art, Mississippi	144	
	Nocturne: Grey and Gold, Westminster Bridge	1871–1872	Oil on canvas	63 x 47 cm	Burrell Collection, Glasgow	145	
	Nocturne in Blue and Silver	1872–1878	Oil on canvas	44.5 x 61 cm	Yale Center for British Art, Connecticut	151	
	Nocturne, Blue and Silver: Battersea Reach	1872–1878	Oil on canvas	39.4 x 62.9 cm	Isabella Stewart Gardner Museum, Massachusetts	152	
	Nocturne	1870	Oil on canvas	50.6 x 76.7 cm	White House, Washington, D.C.	153	
	Nocturne	1875–1880	Oil on canvas	31.1 x 51.8 cm	Philadelphia Museum of Art, Pennsylvania	156	
	Nocturne in Black and Gold: The Gardens	1872–1875	Oil on canvas	49.5 x 76.2 cm	Fogg Museum (Harvard), Massachusetts	163	
	Cremorne Gardens, No. 2	1870	Oil on canvas	68.6 x 134.9 cm	Metropolitan Museum of Art, New York	164	
	Nocturne: Cremorne Gardens, No. 3	1875–1877	Oil on canvas	44.9 x 63.1 cm	Freer Gallery of Art, Washington, D.C.	165	
	Nocturne in Green and Gold	1877	Oil on canvas	63.8 x 77.2 cm	Metropolitan Museum of Art, New York	166	
	Nocturne: Black and Gold - The Fire Wheel	1875	Oil on canvas	76.2 x 54.3 cm	Tate Britain, London	169	
	Nocturne in Black and Gold – The Falling Rocket	1875	Oil on panel	60.3 x 46.4 cm	Detroit Institute of Arts, Michigan	170	
	Nocturne	1875–1877	Oil on canvas	55.5 x 39.4 cm	Hunterian Museum and Art Gallery, Glasgow	172	
	Nocturne: Trafalgar Square, Chelsea—Snow	1875–1877	Oil on canvas	47.2 x 62 cm	Freer Gallery of Art, Washington, D.C.	173	
	Nocturne in Grey and Gold: Chelsea Snow	1876	Oil on canvas	47.2 x 62.5 cm	Fogg Museum (Harvard), Massachusetts	174	
	Nocturne in Black and Gold: Entrance to Southampton Water	1876–1881	Oil on canvas	47.6 x 62.3 cm	Freer Gallery of Art, Washington, D.C.	179	
	Arrangement in Black and Brown: The Fur Jacket	1877	Oil on canvas	193 x 92.6 cm	Worcester Art Museum, Massachusetts	181	
	Arrangement in Yellow and Gray: Effie Deans	1876–1878	Oil on canvas	194 x 93 cm	Rijksmuseum, Amsterdam	183	
	Portrait Sketch of a Lady	1875–1878	Oil on canvas	67.5 x 50.1 cm	Freer Gallery of Art, Washington, D.C.	184	
	Arrangement in White and Black	c. 1876	Oil on canvas	191.4 x 90.9 cm	Freer Gallery of Art, Washington, D.C.	185	
	Arrangement in Black, No. 3: Sir Henry Irving as Philip II of Spain	1876–1885	Oil on canvas	215.3 x 108.6 cm	Metropolitan Museum of Art, New York	187	
	Harmony in Yellow and Gold: The Gold Girl—Connie Gilchrist	1876	Oil on canvas	217.8 x 109.5 cm	Metropolitan Museum of Art, New York	190	
	Harmony in Flesh Colour and Black: Portrait of Mrs Louise Jopling	1877	Oil on canvas	192.5 x 90 cm	Hunterian Museum and Art Gallery, Glasgow	191	
	Harmony in Blue: The Duet	1874	Oil on panel	27.3 x 47 cm	Rhode Island School of Design Museum, Rhode Island	196	
	Selsey Shore	1875	Oil on canvas	45.7 x 61 cm	Hill-Stead Museum, Connecticut	200	
	Arrangement in Brown and Black: Portrait of Miss Rosa Corder	1870	Oil on canvas		The Frick Collection, New York	203	
	Nocturne in Black and Gold: Rag Shop, Chelsea	1878	Oil on canvas	36.2 x 50.8 cm	Fogg Museum (Harvard), Massachusetts	204	
	Nocturne: Grey and Silver – Chelsea Embankment, Winter	1879	Oil on canvas	62.6 x 47.5 cm	Freer Gallery of Art, Washington, D.C.	205	
	Mrs. Lewis Jarvis (Ada Maud Vesey-Dawson Jarvis)	1879	Oil on canvas	63.2 x 40.3 cm	Smith College Museum of Art, Massachusetts	206	
	The Blue Girl: Portrait of Connie Gilchrist	1879	Oil on canvas	188.9 x 88.6 cm	Hunterian Museum and Art Gallery, Glasgow	207	
	The Gold Scab: Eruption in Frilthy Lucre	1879	Oil on canvas	186.7 x 139.7 cm	Fine Arts Museums of San Francisco, California	208	
	Nocturne in Blue and Silver: The Lagoon, Venice	1879–1880	Oil on canvas	50.16 x 65.4 cm	Museum of Fine Arts Boston, Massachusetts	212	
	Nocturne: Blue and Gold, St Mark’s, Venice	1880	Oil on canvas	75.4 x 90.5 cm	National Museum Cardiff, Cardiff	213	
	Arrangement in Black: Girl Reading	1880	Oil on panel	22.9 x 30.5 cm	Metropolitan Museum of Art, New York	223	
	Arrangement in Black: Reading	1881–1884	Oil on panel	24.7 x 19.2 cm	Private collection	224	
	The Gold Ruff	1881–1884	Oil on panel	25.8 x 18 cm	Hunterian Museum and Art Gallery, Glasgow	225	
	Arrangement in Black: Lady Meux	1881–1882	Oil on canvas	194.3 x 130.2 cm	Honolulu Museum of Art, Hawaii	228	
	Harmony in Pink and Grey: Portrait of Lady Meux	1881	Oil on canvas	193.7 x 93 cm	The Frick Collection, New York	229	
	Harmony in Coral and Blue: Miss Finch	1885	Oil on canvas	191 x 89.5 cm	Hunterian Museum and Art Gallery, Glasgow	237	
	Harmony in Fawn Colour and Purple: Miss Finch	1885	Oil on canvas	189.3 x 88.7 cm	Hunterian Museum and Art Gallery, Glasgow	238	
	Harmony in Blue and Violet: Miss Finch	1885	Oil on canvas	191.1 x 88.9 cm	Hunterian Museum and Art Gallery, Glasgow	239	
	Arrangement in Black (The Lady in the Yellow Buskin)	1883	Oil on canvas	86 x 43.5 in	Philadelphia Museum of Art, Pennsylvania	242	
	Portrait of M. R. Elden	1882–1884	Oil on canvas	29.2 x 22.2 cm	Private collection	245	
	Chelsea Shops	1880	Oil on panel	13.5 x 23.4 cm	Freer Gallery of Art, Washington, D.C.	246	
	Street in Old Chelsea	1880–1885	Oil on panel	13.33 x 22.86 cm	Museum of Fine Arts Boston, Massachusetts	249	
	Arrangement in Black, No. 8: Portrait of Mrs. Cassatt	1883–1885	Oil on canvas	191.1 x 90.8 cm	Private collection	250	
	Arrangement in Flesh Colour and Black: Portrait of Theodore Duret	1883	Oil on canvas	193.4 x 90.8 cm	Metropolitan Museum of Art, New York	252	
	Harmony in Red: Lamplight	1884–1886	Oil on canvas	190.5 x 89.5 cm	Hunterian Museum and Art Gallery, Glasgow	253	
	Note in Red: The Siesta	1883–1884	Oil on panel	21.1 x 30.5 cm	Terra Foundation for American Art, Illinois	254	
	Red and Pink: La Petite Mephisto	1883–1884	Oil on panel	25.4 x 20.3 cm	Freer Gallery of Art, Washington, D.C.	255	
	Note en Rouge: L'Eventail	1883–1884	Oil on panel	8.8 x 14.7 cm	Freer Gallery of Art, Washington, D.C.	256	
	The Little White Sofa	1883–1884	Oil on panel	11.4 x 18.3 cm	Fogg Museum (Harvard), Massachusetts	258	
	Note in Flesh Colour and Grey: Portrait of Miss Dorothy Menpes	1884–1885	Oil on panel	21.6 x 12.7 cm	Private collection	260	
	The Note in Orange and Blue (Sweet Shop)	1884	Oil on panel	12 x 18 cm	Isabella Stewart Gardner Museum, Massachusetts	263	
	An Orange Note: Sweet Shop	1883–1884	Oil on panel	12.2 x 21.5 cm	Freer Gallery of Art, Washington, D.C.	264	
	A Grey Note: Village Street January	1884	Oil on panel	12.5 x 21.5 cm	Hunterian Museum and Art Gallery, Glasgow	265	
	Green and Silver: The Devonshire Cottages	1862–1865	Oil on canvas	32 x 62.8 cm	Freer Gallery of Art, Washington, D.C.	266	
	St Ives: The Beach	1884	Oil on panel	22.5 x 29 cm	Private collection	267	
	Note in Red and Violet: Nets	1884	Oil on panel	12.2 x 21.5 cm	Private collection	269	
	Note in Blue and Opal—The Sun Cloud	1884	Oil on panel	12.4 x 21.7 cm	Freer Gallery of Art, Washington, D.C.	271	
	Pink and Opal: Harbour	1884	Oil on panel	12.4 x 22.2 cm	Colby College Museum of Art, Maine	272	
	Seashore: Grey and Black	1897	Oil on panel	14 x 23.5 cm	Hermitage Museum, St. Petersburg	274	
	A Freshening Breeze	1884–1885	Oil on panel	21 x 13.3 cm	Terra Foundation for American Art, Illinois	275	
	Blue and Gold: The Schooner	1883–1884	Oil on panel	8.9 x 15.2 cm	Private collection	276	
	Cliffs and Breakers	1884	Oil on panel	12.4 x 21.6 cm	Hunterian Museum and Art Gallery, Glasgow	278	
	Low Tide	1884–1886	Oil on panel	13.8 x 23.5 cm	Freer Gallery of Art, Washington, D.C.	280	
	La Petite Maison rouge c.1881	1883	Oil on panel	21.5 x 12.4 cm	Hunterian Museum and Art Gallery, Glasgow	281	
	The Angry Sea	1884	Oil on panel	12.4 x 21.7 cm	Freer Gallery of Art, Washington, D.C.	282	
	A Coast Scene with Boats (Note: Attribution to Whistler doubtful)	1900–1903	Oil on panel	14 x 23.5 cm	Private collection	285	
	The Pier: A Grey Note	1884	Oil on panel	8.7 x 14.8 cm	Fine Arts Museums of San Francisco, California	286	
	Grey and Silver Mist: Life Boat	1884	Oil on panel	12.3 x 21.6 cm	Freer Gallery of Art, Washington, D.C.	287	
	The Sea and Sand	1884	Oil on panel	13.4 x 23.4 cm	Freer Gallery of Art, Washington, D.C.	288	
	The White House	1884–1885	Oil on panel	13.6 x 23.6 cm	Freer Gallery of Art, Washington, D.C.	289	
	Chelsea Houses	1884–1888	Oil on panel	13.3 x 23.5 cm	Cantor Arts Center at Stanford University, California	290	
	View of the Harbor at Dordrecht: Grey and Green	1884–1886	Oil on panel	14.61 x 25.08 cm	Colby College Museum of Art, Maine	295	
	Blue and Grey—Unloading	1884	Oil on panel	8.9 x 14.9 cm	Freer Gallery of Art, Washington, D.C.	296	
	The Seashore	1883–1885	Oil on panel	8.26 x 15.24 cm	Minneapolis Institute of Art, Minnesota	297	
	Violet and Silver: The Great Sea	1884	Oil on panel	13.8 x 23.5 cm	Freer Gallery of Art, Washington, D.C.	298	
	Blue and Emerald: Coal Mine	1884	Oil on panel	8.8 x 14.9 cm	Freer Gallery of Art, Washington, D.C.	302	
	Wortley; Note in Green	1884	Oil on panel	13.5 x 23.4 cm	Freer Gallery of Art, Washington, D.C.	303	
	Harmony in Brown and Gold: Old Chelsea Church	1884	Oil on panel	8.9 x 14.8 cm	Freer Gallery of Art, Washington, D.C.	305	
	Red and Blue: Lindsey Houses	1883–1884	Oil on panel	13.4 x 23.5 cm	Freer Gallery of Art, Washington, D.C.	306	
	A Courtyard with an Open Workshop and a Standing Woman (Note: Attribution to Whistler and date uncertain)	1901–1903	Oil on panel	12.1 x 12.1 cm	Private collection	308	
	Nocturne: Silver and Opal--Chelsea	1884	Oil on panel	20.3 x 25.7 cm	Freer Gallery of Art, Washington, D.C.	309	
	Shopgirl	1880–1900	Oil on canvas	14 x 23 cm	Hermitage Museum, St. Petersburg	310	
	The Girl in Red	1884	Oil on canvas	51.1 x 31.1 cm	Private collection	312	
	Study in Rose and Brown	1884	Oil on canvas	51.7 x 31.1 cm	Muskegon Museum of Art, Michigan	313	
	The Chelsea Girl	1884	Oil on canvas	165.1 x 88.9 cm	Crystal Bridges Museum of American Art, Arkansas	314	
	Arrangement in Black: Portrait of Señor Pablo de Sarasate	1884	Oil on canvas	228.6 x 121.9 cm	Carnegie Museum of Art, Pennsylvania	315	
	Portrait of a Man in Evening Dress	1880	Oil on panel	16.1 x 9.2 cm	Ashmolean Museum, Oxford	316	
	Note in Green and Brown: Orlando at Coombe	1884	Oil on panel	14.8 x 9 cm	Hunterian Museum and Art Gallery, Glasgow	317	
	Ariel	1884	Oil on panel	21.5 x 12.2 cm	Hunterian Museum and Art Gallery, Glasgow	318	
	Violet and Rose: La Belle de Jour	1885	Oil on panel	17.5 x 10.8 cm	Fogg Museum (Harvard), Massachusetts	319	
	Arrangement in Grey: Portrait of Master Stephen Manuel	1885	Oil on canvas	50.8 x 38.1 cm	Freer Gallery of Art, Washington, D.C.	321	
	Portrait of a Child	1885–1895	Oil on canvas	20.125 x 12.125 in	Colby College Museum of Art, Maine	321a	
	Arrangement in Pink, Red and Purple	1885	Oil on canvas		Cincinnati Art Museum, Ohio	324	
	White and Grey: Courtyard, House in Dieppe	1885	Oil on panel	21.7 x 12.5 cm	Fogg Museum (Harvard), Massachusetts	325	
	Coast Scene, Bathers	1884–1885	Oil on panel	13.8 x 22.1 cm	Art Institute of Chicago, Illinois	326	
	Harmony in Blue and Pearl: The Sands, Dieppe	1885	Oil on panel	22.8 x 14 cm	National Gallery of Australia, London	327	
	Green and Violet: The Evening Walk	1896	Oil on panel	12.7 x 21.6 cm	Crystal Bridges Museum of American Art, Arkansas	328	
	Grey and Brown: The Sad Sea Shore	1885	Oil on panel	12.5 x 21.7 cm	Freer Gallery of Art, Washington, D.C.	330	
	Green and Violet: Mrs. Walter Sickert	1893–1894	Oil on canvas	86.4 x 62.2 cm	Fogg Museum (Harvard), Massachusetts	338	
	Sketch Portrait of Walter Sickert	1885–1887	Oil on canvas	44.5 x 34.3 cm	Hugh Lane Gallery, Dublin	350	
	Portrait of George A. Lucas	1886	Oil on panel	21.7 x 12.5 cm	Walters Art Museum, Maryland	355	
	A Red Note: Fête on the Sands, Ostend	1887	Oil on panel	13.7 x 23.5 cm	Terra Foundation for American Art, Illinois	366	
	Petite Bonne à la porte d'une auberge	1887–1889	Oil on panel	21.5 x 12.6 cm	Private collection	367	
	The Old Clothes Shop, Houndsditch	1887–1890	Oil on panel	12.4 x 21.6 cm	Hunterian Museum and Art Gallery, Glasgow	371	
	The Greengrocer's Shop, Paris	1887–1890	Oil on panel	14 x 23.4 cm	Hunterian Museum and Art Gallery, Glasgow	372	
	Chelsea Shop	1886–1887	Oil on panel	13 x 22.5 cm	Rhode Island School of Design Museum, Rhode Island	374	
	Carlyle's Sweetstuff Shop	1888–1889	Oil on panel	13 x 21.4 cm	Terra Foundation for American Art, Illinois	375	
	A Shop	1884–1890	Oil on panel	13.9 x 23.3 cm	Hunterian Museum and Art Gallery, Glasgow	376	
	The Shop Window	1888–1890	Oil on panel	12.5 x 22.9 cm	Private collection	377	
	Mother of Pearl and Silver: The Andalusian	1888	Oil on canvas	191.5 x 89.8 cm	National Gallery of Art, Washington, D.C.	378	
	The Sea Shore, Dieppe	1885–1888	Oil on panel	8.9 x 14 cm	Hunterian Museum and Art Gallery, Glasgow	379	
	The Blue Sea	1893–1900	Oil on panel	13.5 x 22.7 cm	Pushkin Museum of Fine Arts, Moscow	380	
	The Sea, Brittany	1888	Oil on panel	8.2 x 14 cm	Hunterian Museum and Art Gallery, Glasgow	381	
	Violet and Blue: The Little Bathers, Pérosquérie	1888	Oil on panel	13 x 21.5 cm	Fogg Museum (Harvard), Massachusetts	382	
	The Butcher's Shop	1888–1895	Oil on panel	12.5 x 21.8 cm	Freer Gallery of Art, Washington, D.C.	383	
	The Canal, Amsterdam	1889	Oil on panel	13.8 x 23.2 cm	Hunterian Museum and Art Gallery, Glasgow	384	
	The Grey House	1889	Oil on panel	23.5 x 13.8 cm	Freer Gallery of Art, Washington, D.C.	385	
	Sketch for a Portrait of Miss Ethel Philip	1889–1896	Oil on canvas	62.2 x 47 cm	Hunterian Museum and Art Gallery, Glasgow	386	
	Sketch of Miss Ethel Philip	1897–1900	Oil on canvas	62.2 x 47 cm	Hunterian Museum and Art Gallery, Glasgow	387	
	Red and Black: The Fan	1891–1894	Oil on canvas	187.4 x 89.8 cm	Hunterian Museum and Art Gallery, Glasgow	388	
	Rose et argent: La Jolie Mutine	1890	Oil on canvas	190.5 x 89.5 cm	Hunterian Museum and Art Gallery, Glasgow	389	
	The Rose Scarf	1890	Oil on panel	25.8 x 18 cm	Hunterian Museum and Art Gallery, Glasgow	390	
	Portrait of Ellen Sturgis Hooper	1890	Oil on canvas	51 x 30.7 cm	Private collection	391	
	Miss Lillian Woakes	1890	Oil on canvas		The Phillips Collection, Washington, D.C.	393	
	Head of a Young Woman	1890	Oil on canvas	46.0375 x 37.7825 cm	Smithsonian American Art Museum, Washington, D.C.	394	
	Harmony in Brown: The Felt Hat c.1890	1891	Oil on canvas	191.3 x 89.9 cm	Hunterian Museum and Art Gallery, Glasgow	395	
	Arrangement in Black and Gold: Comte Robert de Montesquiou-Fezensac	1891–1892	Oil on canvas	208.6 x 91.8 cm	The Frick Collection, New York	398	
	Nude Girl with a Bowl	1892–1895	Oil on panel	51.4 x 32.2 cm	Hunterian Museum and Art Gallery, Glasgow	400	
	The Little Red Cap	1894	Oil on canvas	73 x 49.8 cm	Hunterian Museum and Art Gallery, Glasgow	401	
	Arrangement in Grey and Green. Portrait of John James Cowan	1893–1900	Oil on canvas	95.5 x 51 cm	National Galleries Scotland, Edinburgh	402	
	Edward Guthrie Kennedy	1893–1895	Oil on panel	29.4 x 17.8 cm	Metropolitan Museum of Art, New York	404	
	Portrait Study of a Man (Note: Attribution to Whistler doubtful)	1890–1900	Oil on panel	16.8 x 10.2 cm	Fitzwilliam Museum, Cambridge	405	
	Brown and Gold: Portrait of Lady Eden	1894–1895	Oil on panel	20.4 x 32.4 cm	Hunterian Museum and Art Gallery, Glasgow	408	
	The Bathing Posts, Brittany	1893	Oil on panel	16.6 x 24.3 cm	Hunterian Museum and Art Gallery, Glasgow	409	
	Marine: Blue and Grey	1884–1885	Oil on panel	14 x 22.2 cm	Colby College Museum of Art, Maine	410	
	Violet and Silver - The Deep Sea	1893	Oil on canvas	50.2 x 73.3 cm	Art Institute of Chicago, Illinois	411	
	Symphony in Violet and Blue	1893	Oil on canvas	50.8 x 72.4 cm	Hill-Stead Museum, Connecticut	412	
	Violet and Blue: Among the Rollers	1893	Oil on panel	17.8 x 25.4 cm	Detroit Institute of Arts, Michigan	413	
	Seascape	1890–1895	Oil on canvas	11 x 14.4 cm	Private collection	414	
	Self-Portrait	1893–1899	Oil on canvas	27.1 x 21.5 cm	Fogg Museum (Harvard), Massachusetts	416	
	Miss Ethel Philip Reading	1894	Oil on panel	21.2 x 12.7 cm	Hunterian Museum and Art Gallery, Glasgow	417	
	Rose et or: La Tulipe 1894	1894–1896	Oil on canvas	190.5 x 89 cm	Hunterian Museum and Art Gallery, Glasgow	418	
	Harmony in Black: Miss Ethel Philip	1894–1896	Oil on canvas	187.2 x 89.7 cm	Hunterian Museum and Art Gallery, Glasgow	419	
	Rose et vert: L'Iris – Portrait of Miss Kinsella	1894–1902	Oil on canvas	191.8 x 90.2 cm	Terra Foundation for American Art, Illinois	420	
	Harmony in Blue and Gold: The Little Blue Girl	1894	Oil on canvas	74.7 x 50.5 cm	Freer Gallery of Art, Washington, D.C.	421	
	The Violin Player	1894	Oil on canvas	79 x 53.3 cm	Cleveland Museum of Art, Ohio	422	
	Gold and Orange: The Neighbors	1895–1901	Oil on panel	21.6 x 12.8 cm	Freer Gallery of Art, Washington, D.C.	423	
	Arrangement in Flesh Color and Brown: Portrait of Arthur Jerome Eddy	1894	Oil on canvas	209.9 x 92.4 cm	Art Institute of Chicago, Illinois	425	
	Portrait of Dr Isaac Burnet Davenport	1894–1903	Oil on canvas	58 x 38 cm	Hood Museum of Art, New Hampshire	426	
	Study of a Head	1885–1895	Oil on canvas	57.5 x 36.8 cm	Columbus Museum of Art, Ohio	427	
	Robert Barr	1894	Oil on canvas	39.4 x 32.4 cm	Detroit Institute of Arts, Michigan	428	
	Head of Mrs Beaumont	1894–1895	Oil on canvas	35.5 x 30.5 cm	Frye Art Museum, Washington	430	
	Unfinished Study of a French Girl	1895–1896	Oil on canvas	62.9 x 46.9 cm	Hunterian Museum and Art Gallery, Glasgow	433	
	Portrait Study of Lily Pettigrew	1895	Oil on canvas	60.6 x 45.5 cm	Hunterian Museum and Art Gallery, Glasgow	434	
	The Daughter of the Concierge	1895	Oil on canvas	51.1 x 31.4 cm	Worcester Art Museum, Massachusetts	436	
	Alice Butt	1896–1898	Oil on canvas	63.5 x 47.6 cm	Private collection	437	
	Alice Butt	1895	Oil on canvas	51.7 x 38.1 cm	National Gallery of Art, Washington, D.C.	438	
	Brown and Gold: Self Portrait	1895–1900	Oil on canvas	95.8 x 51.5 cm	Hunterian Museum and Art Gallery, Glasgow	440	
	Crimson Note, Carmen	1895	Oil on canvas	50.8 x 30.5 cm	Hill-Stead Museum, Connecticut	441	
	The Little Forge, Lyme Regis	1895	Oil on panel	13.6 x 23.4 cm	Hunterian Museum and Art Gallery, Glasgow	442	
	The Little Nurse	1895	Oil on panel	12.6 x 21.7 cm	Freer Gallery of Art, Washington, D.C.	443	
	Rose and Red: The Barber's Shop, Lyme Regis	1895	Oil on panel	12.4 x 21 cm	Georgia Museum of Art, Georgia	444	
	A Chelsea Shop	1888–1895	Oil on panel	12.7 x 21.4 cm	Terra Foundation for American Art, Illinois	448	
	Little Rose of Lyme Regis	1895	Oil on canvas	51.43 x 31.11 cm	Museum of Fine Arts Boston, Massachusetts	449	
	The Master Smith of Lyme Regis	1895	Oil on canvas	51.43 x 31.11 cm	Museum of Fine Arts Boston, Massachusetts	450	
	Rose and Gold: "Pretty Nellie Brown"	1895	Oil on canvas	50.8 x 31.115 cm	Pennsylvania Academy of the Fine Arts, Pennsylvania	451	
	Brown and Gold: The Curé's Little Class at St. Catherine, Honfleur	1896	Oil on panel	12.165 x 21.3 cm	Herbert F. Johnson Museum of Art, New York	455	
	A Paris Model	1895–1899	Oil on canvas	57.8 x 44.5 cm	Hunterian Museum and Art Gallery, Glasgow	458	
	The Widow	1895–1900	Oil on canvas	58.4 x 44.5 cm	Private collection	459	
	Self Portrait	1896	Oil on canvas	51.5 x 31.3 cm	Hunterian Museum and Art Gallery, Glasgow	460	
	Self-Portrait	1896	Oil on canvas	52.1 x 31.8 cm	Hunterian Museum and Art Gallery, Glasgow	461	
	Gold and Brown: Self-Portrait	1896–1898	Oil on canvas	62.5 x 46.8 cm	National Gallery of Art, Washington, D.C.	462	
	Lillie in our Alley (The Lady of Lyme Regis)	1898	Oil on canvas	51.9 x 31.3 cm	National Gallery of Canada, London	463	
	Brown and Gold: Lillie "In our Alley!"	1896	Oil on canvas	51.2 x 30.7 cm	Fogg Museum (Harvard), Massachusetts	464	
	Lillie: An Oval	1896	Oil on canvas	60.5 x 48.8 cm	Hunterian Museum and Art Gallery, Glasgow	465	
	Lillie Pamington	1897–1900	Oil on canvas	51 x 31.4 cm	Hunterian Museum and Art Gallery, Glasgow	466	
	The Green and Gold: The Little Green Cap	1901	Oil on canvas	51 x 30.9 cm	Freer Gallery of Art, Washington, D.C.	467	
	The Little Red Glove	1896	Oil on canvas	51.3 x 31.5 cm	Freer Gallery of Art, Washington, D.C.	468	
	Grenat et or: Le petit cardinal	1900–1901	Oil on canvas	51.5 x 31.7 cm	Hunterian Museum and Art Gallery, Glasgow	469	
	Girl in Black (Pouting Tom)	1899–1902	Oil on canvas	51.4 x 31.4 cm	Hirshhorn Museum and Sculpture Garden, Washington, D.C.	470	
	Rose and Brown: The Philosopher	1896–1897	Oil on panel	22.2 x 13 cm	Private collection	472	
	Alexander Arnold Hannay	1896	Oil on panel	22.3 x 13.3 cm	National Gallery of Art, Washington, D.C.	473	
	Green and Gold: A Shop in Calais	1896	Oil on panel	24.5 x 13 cm	Hunterian Museum and Art Gallery, Glasgow	474	
	Little Juniper Bud - Lizzie Willis	1897–1899	Oil on canvas	51.6 x 31.4 cm	Hunterian Museum and Art Gallery, Glasgow	475	
	Little Lizzie Willis	1896–1899	Oil on canvas	51.4 x 31.4 cm	Hunterian Museum and Art Gallery, Glasgow	476	
	The Little London Sparrow	1896–1897	Oil on canvas	52 x 31.8 cm	Private collection	477	
	The Jade Necklace	1896–1900	Oil on canvas	51 x 31.7 cm	Hunterian Museum and Art Gallery, Glasgow	478	
	Miss Rosalind Birnie Philip Standing	1897	Oil on panel	23.4 x 13.7 cm	Hunterian Museum and Art Gallery, Glasgow	479	
	George W. Vanderbilt	1897–1903	Oil on canvas	208.6 x 91.1 cm	National Gallery of Art, Washington, D.C.	481	
	The Priest's Lodging, Dieppe	1897	Oil on panel	16.5 x 24.3 cm	Hunterian Museum and Art Gallery, Glasgow	482	
	Harmony in Blue and Silver: Beaching the Boat, Étretat	1897	Oil on panel	13.6 x 23.5 cm	Fogg Museum (Harvard), Massachusetts	483	
	Le Bebe francais	1897	Oil on canvas	35.7 x 35.7 cm	Hunterian Museum and Art Gallery, Glasgow	484	
	Rose et gris: Geneviève Mallarmé	1897	Oil on panel	20.6 x 12.2 cm	Maison de Mallarmé, Vulaines-sur-Seine	485	
	Study of a Young Girl's Head and Shoulders (Baroness de Meyer)	1896–1897	Oil on panel	14.8 x 8.9 cm	Art Institute of Chicago, Illinois	486	
	Study of a Girl's Head	1896–1897	Oil on panel	27.9 x 17.8 cm	The Newark Museum of Art, New Jersey	487	
	Harmony in Green and Amber: A Draped Study	1898	Oil on canvas	51.1 x 38.3 cm	Hunterian Museum and Art Gallery, Glasgow	488	
	Rose et vert: Une etude	1896–1900	Oil on canvas	82.5 x 51.4 cm	Hunterian Museum and Art Gallery, Glasgow	489	
	Purple and Gold: Phryne the Superb!-- Builder of Temples	1898–1901	Oil on panel	24.2 x 14.2 cm	Freer Gallery of Art, Washington, D.C.	490	
	Study of the Nude	1898–1902	Oil on canvas	74 x 35.4 cm	Hunterian Museum and Art Gallery, Glasgow	493	
	La Sylphide	1899	Oil on canvas	61.2 x 46.2 cm	Hunterian Museum and Art Gallery, Glasgow	494	
	Rose and Brown: La Cigale	1898–1899	Oil on panel	21.7 x 12.6 cm	Freer Gallery of Art, Washington, D.C.	495	
	Flesh Colour and Silver: The Card Players	1898	Oil on panel	12.6 x 21.2 cm	Hunterian Museum and Art Gallery, Glasgow	496	
	Blue and Silver, Dieppe	1880–1885	Oil on panel	12 x 21.2 cm	New Britain Museum of American Art, Connecticut	499	
	Blue and Coral: The Little Blue Bonnet	1898	Oil on canvas	81.2 x 68.5 cm	Los Angeles County Museum of Art, California	500	
	La Toison rouge	1896–1902	Oil on canvas	51.5 x 31 cm	Hunterian Museum and Art Gallery, Glasgow	501	
	Grey and Silver: La Petite Souris	1897–1898	Oil on canvas	50.7 x 31 cm	Hunterian Museum and Art Gallery, Glasgow	502	
	Violet and Blue: The Red Feather	1896–1900	Oil on canvas	50.8 x 31 cm	Fogg Museum (Harvard), Massachusetts	503	
	Rose and Gold: The Little Lady Sophie of Soho	1898–1899	Oil on canvas	64.5 x 53.5 cm	Freer Gallery of Art, Washington, D.C.	504	
	Rose et or: La Napolitaine	1897	Oil on canvas	50 x 31 cm	Thyssen-Bornemisza Museum, Madrid	505	
	Violet and Rose: Carmen qui rit	1898	Oil on canvas	56.4 x 43.3 cm	Hunterian Museum and Art Gallery, Glasgow	506	
	Harmony in Rose and Green: Carmen	1898	Oil on canvas	57.8 x 44.5 cm	Hunterian Museum and Art Gallery, Glasgow	507	
	The Little Faustina	1896–1900	Oil on canvas	50.9 x 30.4 cm	Freer Gallery of Art, Washington, D.C.	510	
	Brun et or: De race	1896–1900	Oil on canvas	51.5 x 31 cm	Hunterian Museum and Art Gallery, Glasgow	511	
	The Boy in a Cloak	1896–1900	Oil on canvas	96.8 x 72.4 cm	Hunterian Museum and Art Gallery, Glasgow	512	
	Vert et Or: Le Raconteur (Green and Gold: The Storyteller)	1896–1900	Oil on canvas	51.3 x 31.3 cm	Freer Gallery of Art, Washington, D.C.	513	
	Study of an Italian Boy	1897–1900	Oil on canvas	62.1 x 47.4 cm	Hunterian Museum and Art Gallery, Glasgow	514	
	Ivoire et or: Portrait de Madame Vanderbilt	1899–1902	Oil on canvas	66 x 54.6 cm	Biltmore Estate, North Carolina	515	
	The Sea, Pourville, No. 1	1899	Oil on panel	17.8 x 25.9 cm	The Hyde Collection, New York	516	
	Green and Silver: The Great Sea	1899	Oil on panel	17.1 x 24.8 cm	Hunterian Museum and Art Gallery, Glasgow	518	
	The Sea, Pourville, No. 2	1899	Oil on panel	14 x 23.2 cm	Munson-Williams-Proctor Arts Institute, New York	519	
	The Sea, Pourville	1899	Oil on panel	13.3 x 23.8 cm	Terra Foundation for American Art, Illinois	520	
	The Shore, Pourville	1899	Oil on panel	13.7 x 23.3 cm	Ashmolean Museum, Oxford	521	
	Marine	1899–1900	Oil on panel	14 x 23.5 cm	Private collection	521a	
	Grey and Gold - High Tide at Pourville	1899–1900	Oil on panel	13.9 x 23.4 cm	Freer Gallery of Art, Washington, D.C.	523	
	Blue and Silver - Boat Entering Pourville	1899	Oil on panel	14.1 x 23.4 cm	Freer Gallery of Art, Washington, D.C.	524	
	A Shop with a Balcony	1899	Oil on panel	22.3 x 13.7 cm	Hunterian Museum and Art Gallery, Glasgow	526	
	La Blanchisseuse, Dieppe	1899	Oil on panel	23.4 x 14 cm	Hunterian Museum and Art Gallery, Glasgow	527	
	The Black Hat - Miss Rosalind Birnie Philip	1900-1902	Oil on canvas	61 x 47 cm	Hunterian Museum and Art Gallery, Glasgow	535	
	Grey and Gold: The Golden Bay, Ireland	1900	Oil on panel	13 x 22.5 cm	Hunter Museum of American Art, Tennessee	537	
	Howth Head, near Dublin	1900	Oil on panel	19.7 x 28.5 cm	Private collection	538	
	The Beach at Marseille (Note: Attribution to Whistler uncertain)	1901	Oil on panel	20.5 x 33.2 cm	Terra Foundation for American Art, Illinois	543	
	A Corsican Child	1901	Oil on canvas	51.8 x 31.5 cm	Hunterian Museum and Art Gallery, Glasgow	544	
	A Distant Dome	1901	Oil on panel	12.7 x 21.7 cm	Hunterian Museum and Art Gallery, Glasgow	545	
	Ajaccio, Corsica	1901	Oil on panel	12.4 x 21.6 cm	Fogg Museum (Harvard), Massachusetts	546	
	Portrait of Richard A. Canfield	1901–1903	Oil on canvas	53.3 x 33 cm	Private collection	547	
	Portrait of a Baby	1900–1902	Oil on canvas	62 x 47 cm	Private collection	549	
	Charles Lang Freer	1902	Oil on panel	86 x 65.5 cm	Freer Gallery of Art, Washington, D.C.	550	
	Dorothy Seton - A Daughter of Eve	1903	Oil on canvas	51.7 x 31.8 cm	Hunterian Museum and Art Gallery, Glasgow	552	
