= Chelsea in Ice =

Painting by James McNeill Whistler

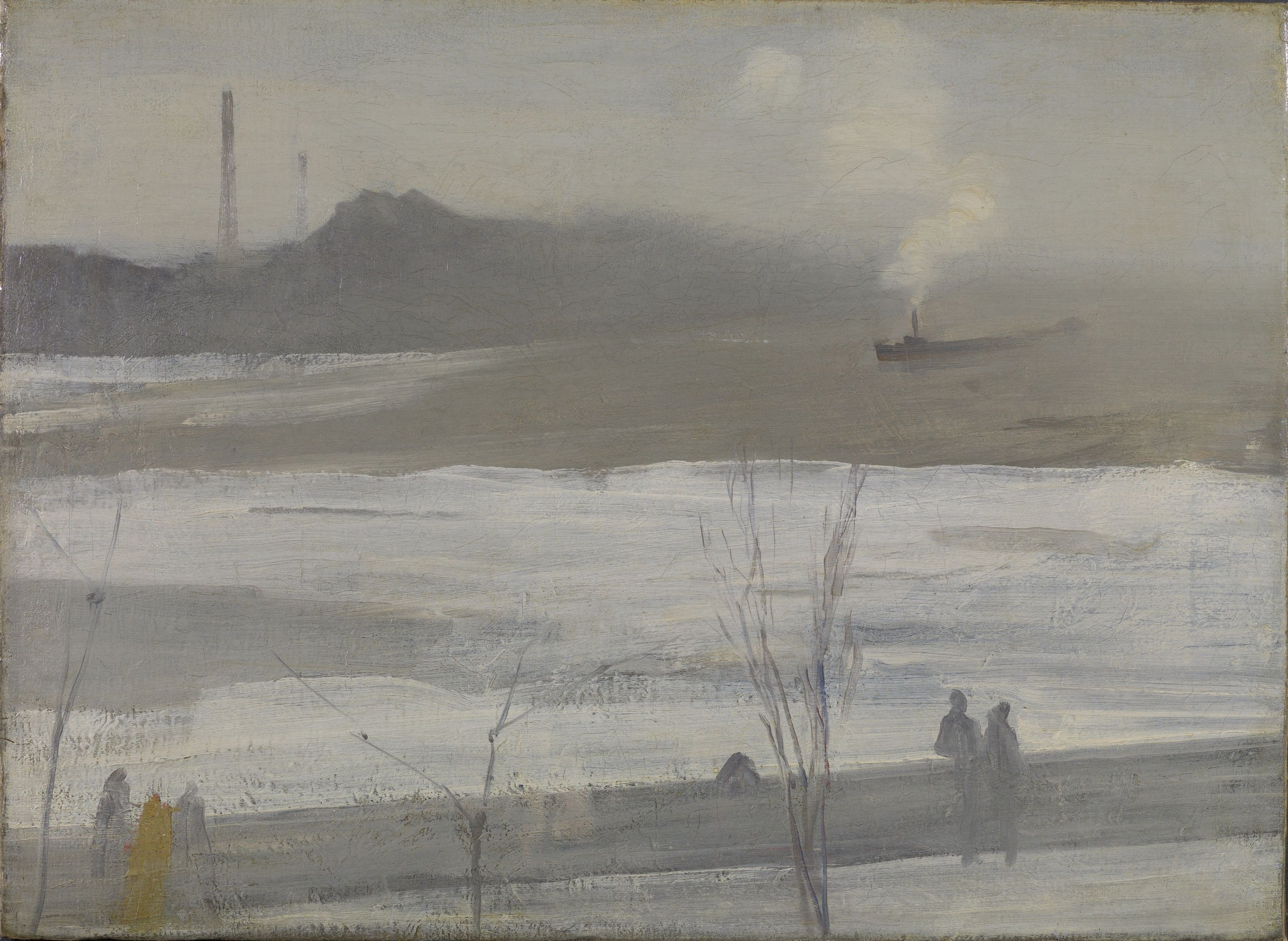
- Artist: James McNeill Whistler
- Year: 1864
- Type: Oil on canvas, landscape painting
- Dimensions: 45 cm × 60.9 cm (18 in × 24.0 in)
- Location: Colby College Museum of Art, Maine

Chelsea in Ice is an 1864 landscape painting by the American artist James McNeill Whistler. A cityscape, it depicts a view of the River Thames at Chelsea. A single steamer heads through the ice-filled river. Both the title and the atmospheric subject is reminiscent of his 1860 painting The Thames in Ice. The presence of industrial buildings on the Battersea side are similar to those which appear in his Japonisme-styled The Balcony around the same time.

Stylistically it shows The painting is today in the collection of the Colby College Museum of Art in Waterville, Maine having been acquired for 2.6 million dollars in 2000.

== See also ==
- List of paintings by James McNeill Whistler

== Bibliography ==
- Belzer, Allison Scardino. The Ashurst Sisters: Nurturing Rebellion Across the Nineteenth Century. Springer Nature Switzerland, 2025.
- Jacobi, Carol (ed.) James McNeill Whistler. Tate Publishing, 2026.
- Sutherland, Daniel E. Whistler: A Life for Art's Sake. Yale University Press, 2014.
