= Chelsea Snow =

Painting by James McNeill Whistler

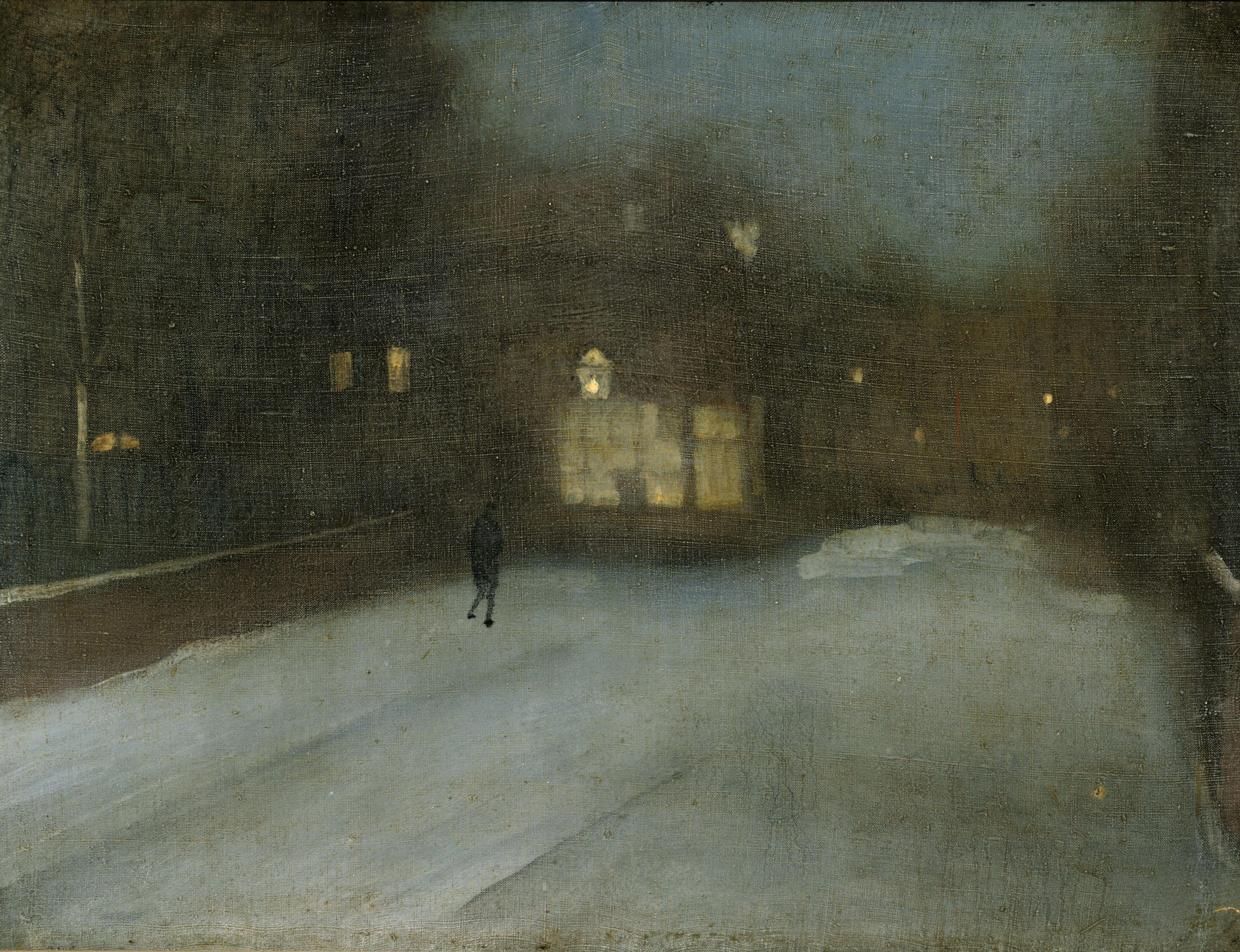
- Artist: James McNeill Whistler
- Year: 1876
- Type: Oil on canvas, landscape painting
- Dimensions: 47.2 cm × 62.5 cm (18.6 in × 24.6 in)
- Location: Fogg Museum, Cambridge, Massachusetts

Nocturne in Grey and Gold, Chelsea Snow is an 1876 oil painting by the Anglo-American artist James McNeill Whistler. It depicts a snow-covered street scene in Chelsea in London featuring the lighted windows of a tavern. Whistler lived and worked in the suburb and during the decade had produced his Nocturnes a series of views of the capital, many of them featuring the River Thames by night. The painting was displayed at the Grosvenor Gallery Exhibition of 1878 held at in Bond Street and reflected his theory of Tonalism. The initial owner was the art dealer Charles Augustus Howell. Since 1943 it has been part of the collection of the Fogg Museum of Harvard University in Cambridge, Massachusetts.

== See also ==
- List of paintings by James McNeill Whistler

== Bibliography ==
- Denney, Colleen. At the Temple of Art: The Grosvenor Gallery, 1877-1890 . Fairleigh Dickinson University Press, 2000.
- Jacobi, Carol (ed.) James McNeill Whistler. Tate Publishing, 2026.
- Merrill, Linda. After Whistler: The Artist and His Influence on American Painting. Yale University Press, 2003.
- Sutherland, Daniel E. Whistler: A Life for Art's Sake. Yale University Press, 2014.
