= St Mark's, Venice (Whistler) =

Painting by James McNeill Whistler

St Mark’s, Venice
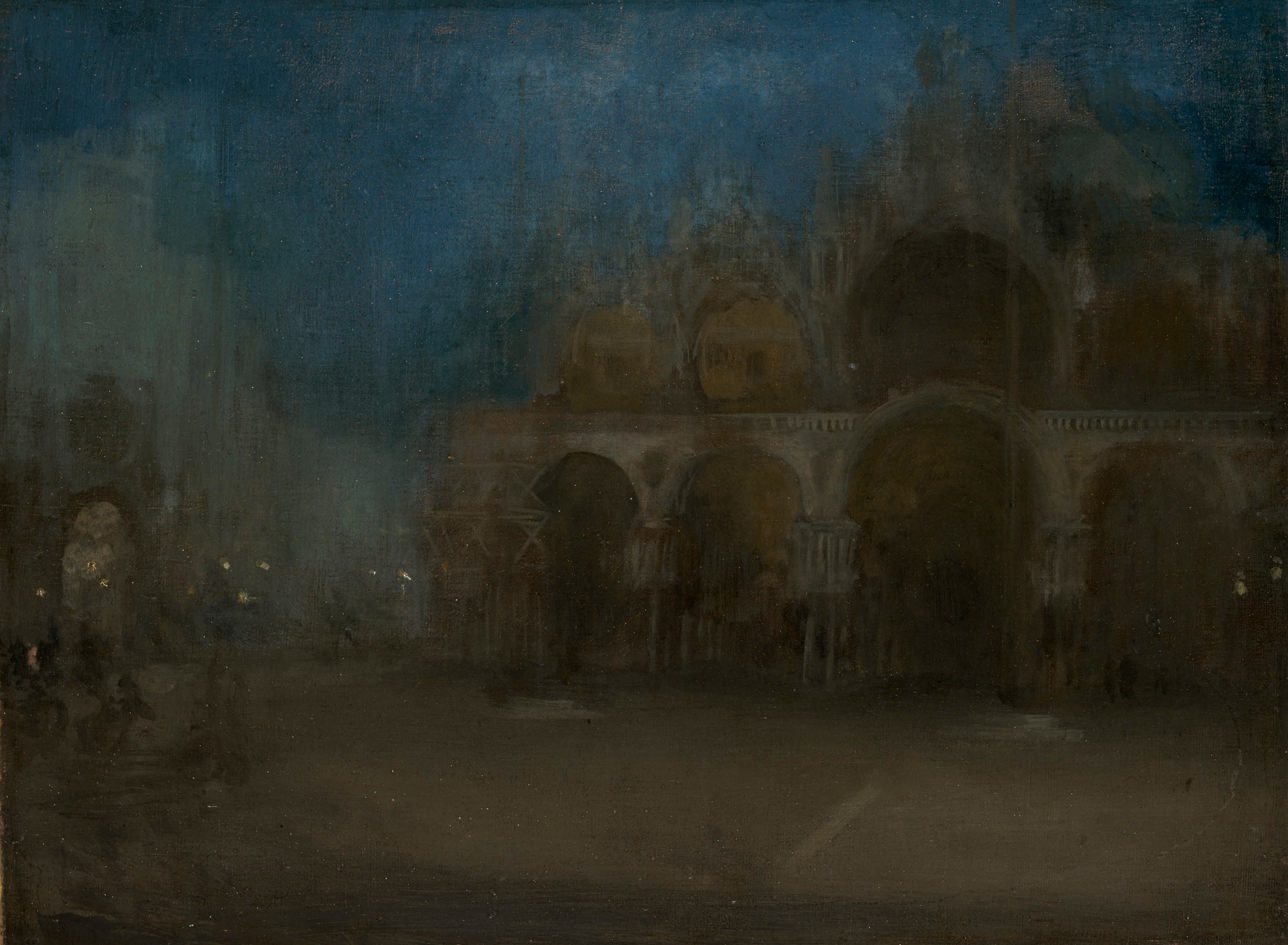
- Artist: James McNeill Whistler
- Year: 1880
- Type: Oil on canvas, landscape painting
- Dimensions: 75.4 cm × 90.5 cm (29.7 in × 35.6 in)
- Location: National Museum, Cardiff

Nocturne in Blue and Gold: St Mark’s, Venice is an 1880 oil painting by the Anglo-American artist James McNeill Whistler. It depicts a view of St Mark's Basilica with the Clocktower beside it with flickers of illumination from the gas light. It is painted in the style of the Nocturnes of the River Thames in London.

Whistler went to Venice following the conclusion of his expensive libel trial against John Ruskin over his review of the Artist's submissions to the Grosvenor Gallery Exhibition of 1877. This was one of two oil paintings he produced during the trip alongside the series of etchings he produced for the Fine Art Society.

Whistler first exhibited the work at the Society of British Artists in 1886. Today the painting is part of the collection of the National Museum of Wales in Cardiff, which acquired it in 1951.

== See also ==
- List of paintings by James McNeill Whistler

== Bibliography ==
- Adelson, Warren. Sargent's Venice. Yale University Press, 2006.
- Halsby, Julian. Venice: The Artist's Vision : a Guide to British and American Painters. Unicorn, 1999.
- Lovell, Margaretta M. Venice: The American View, 1860-1920. Fine Arts Museums of San Francisco, 1984.
- MacDonald, Margaret F. Palaces in theNight: Whistler in Venice. University of California Press, 2001.
- Murphy, Paul Thomas. Falling Rocket: James Whistler, John Ruskin, and the Battle for Modern Art, Simon & Schuster, 2023.
- Sutherland, Daniel E. Whistler: A Life for Art's Sake. Yale University Press, 2014.
