= Portrait of Frederick Richards Leyland =

Painting by James McNeill Whistler

- Artist: James McNeill Whistler
- Year: 1870–73
- Type: Oil on canvas, portrait painting
- Dimensions: 218.5 cm × 119.4 cm (86.0 in × 47.0 in)
- Location: Freer Gallery of Art, Washington D.C.

Arrangement in Black: Portrait of Frederick Richards Leyland is an 1873 portrait painting by the Anglo-American artist James McNeill Whistler. It depicts the shipping magnate and art collector Frederick Richards Leyland. Leyland was Whistler's first major patron, but the two men ultimately had a fierce falling out over The Peacock Room, which Whistler designed for Leyland's townhouse in Kensington.

The painting was displayed at an exhibition of Whistler's works held at the Flemish Gallery in Pall Mall. Today it is in the collection of the Freer Gallery of Art, part of the Smithsonian Institution in Washington D.C. which acquired it in 1920.

== See also ==
- List of paintings by James McNeill Whistler

== Bibliography ==
- Merrill, Linda. The Peacock Room: A Cultural Biography. Freer Gallery of Art, 1998.
- Sutherland, Daniel E. Whistler: A Life for Art's Sake. Yale University Press, 2014.
