= Henry Irving as Charles I =

Painting by James Archer

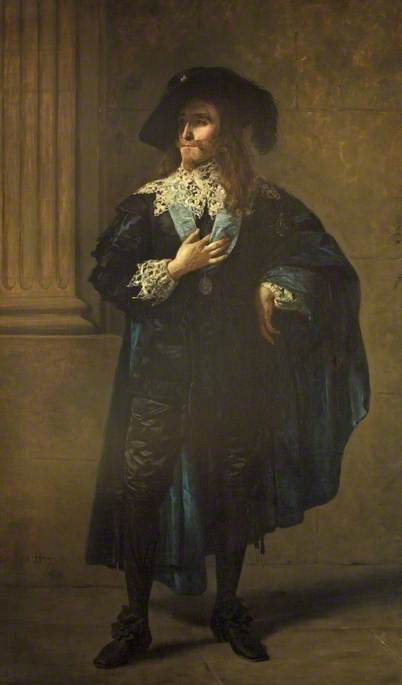
- Artist: James Archer
- Year: 1873
- Type: Oil on canvas, portrait painting
- Dimensions: 221.3 cm × 130 cm (87.1 in × 51 in)
- Location: Russell-Cotes Art Gallery, Bournemouth

Henry Irving as Charles I is an 1873 portrait painting by the British artist James Archer. It depicts the English actor-manager Henry Irving, a celebrated figure of the Victorian era theatre. Irving is shown in costume for one of his greatest hits, the role of Charles I in the play of the same title by the Irish writer. William Gorman Wills. This appeared at the Lyceum Theatre in the West End for a lengthy run.

The picture was displayed at the Royal Academy Exhibition of 1873 held at Burlington House in Piccadilly. Irving hung the painting in his own London residence. The painting is now in the collection of the Russell-Cotes Art Gallery in Bournemouth having been gifted to the gallery by Merton Russell-Cotes, an art collector and former Mayor of Bournemouth in 1921

== See also ==
- Henry Irving as Philip II of Spain, an 1876 painting by James McNeill Whistler

== Bibliography ==
- Bills, Mark. Art in the Age of Queen Victoria: A Wealth of Depictions. Russell-Cotes Art Gallery and Museum, 2001.
- Richards, Jeffrey. Sir Henry Irving: A Victorian Actor and His World. Bloomsbury Academic, 2007.
