= Portrait of the Painter (Whistler) =

Painting by James McNeill Whistler

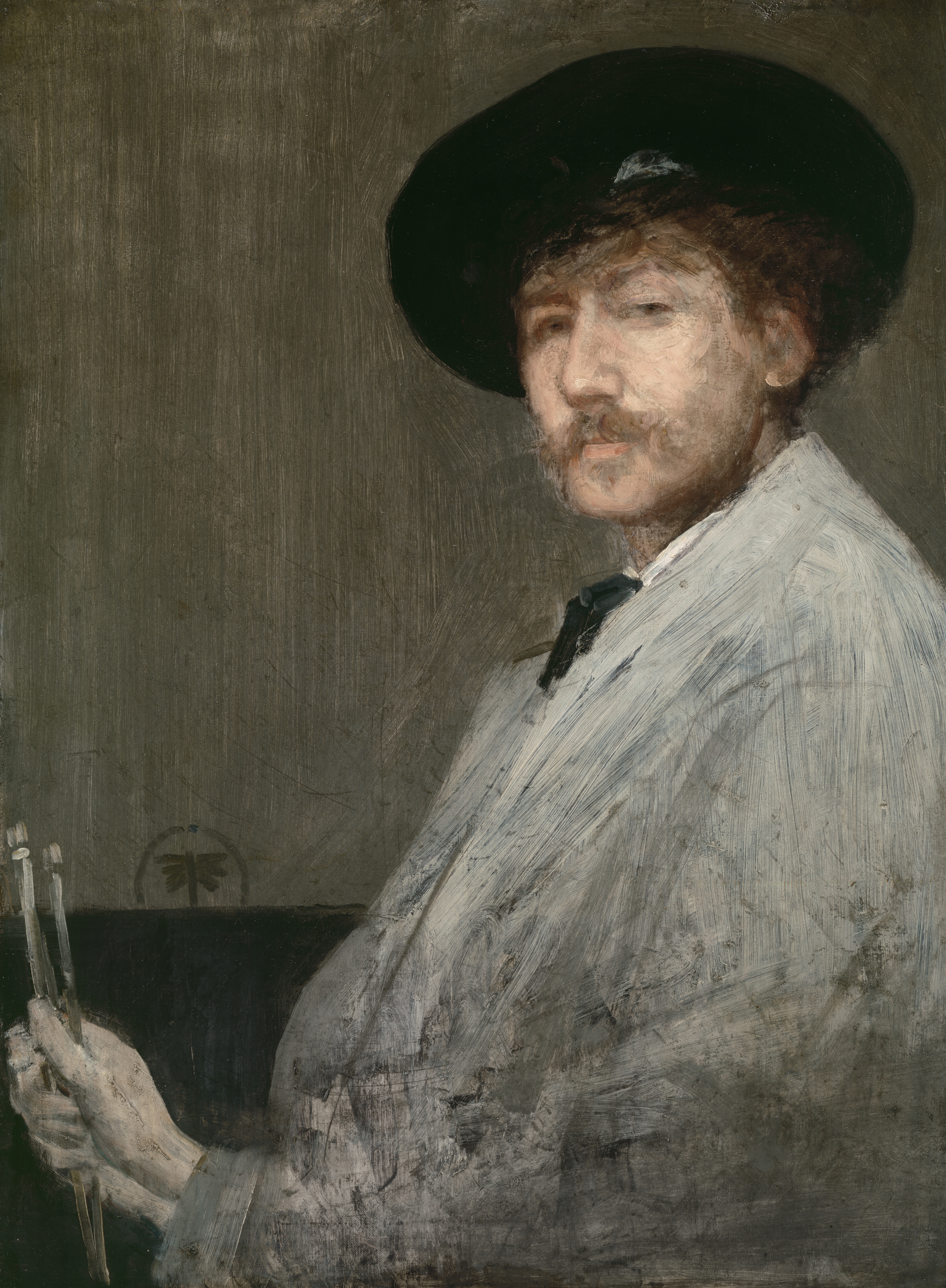
- Artist: James McNeill Whistler
- Year: c.1872
- Type: Oil on canvas, portrait painting
- Dimensions: 74.9 cm × 53.3 cm (29.5 in × 21.0 in)
- Location: Detroit Institute of Arts, Michigan

Portrait of the Painter is a c.1872 self-portrait by the Anglo-American artist James McNeill Whistler. It was produced when he was living and working in Chelsea on the banks of the River Thames. It marked Whistler's ambitions to be seen as a portraitist in the long European tradition, typified by Rembrandt's 1659 Self-Portrait with Beret and Turned-Up Collar.

The picture is also known by the longer title Arrangement in Grey: Portrait of the Painter. The painting is in the collection of the Detroit Institute of Arts in Michigan, which acquired it in 1934.

== See also ==
- List of paintings by James McNeill Whistler

== Bibliography ==
- Chilvers Ian & Bean, Rachel. The Artist Revealed: Artists and Their Self-portraits. Thunder Bay Press, 2003.
- Jacobi, Carol (ed.) James McNeill Whistler. Tate Publishing, 2026.
- Murphy, Michael. Proust and America: The Influence of American Art, Culture, and Literature on A la Recherché Du Temps Perdu. Liverpool University Press, 2007.
- Sutherland, Daniel E. Whistler: A Life for Art's Sake. Yale University Press, 2014.
