= Cremorne Lights =

Painting by James McNeill Whistler

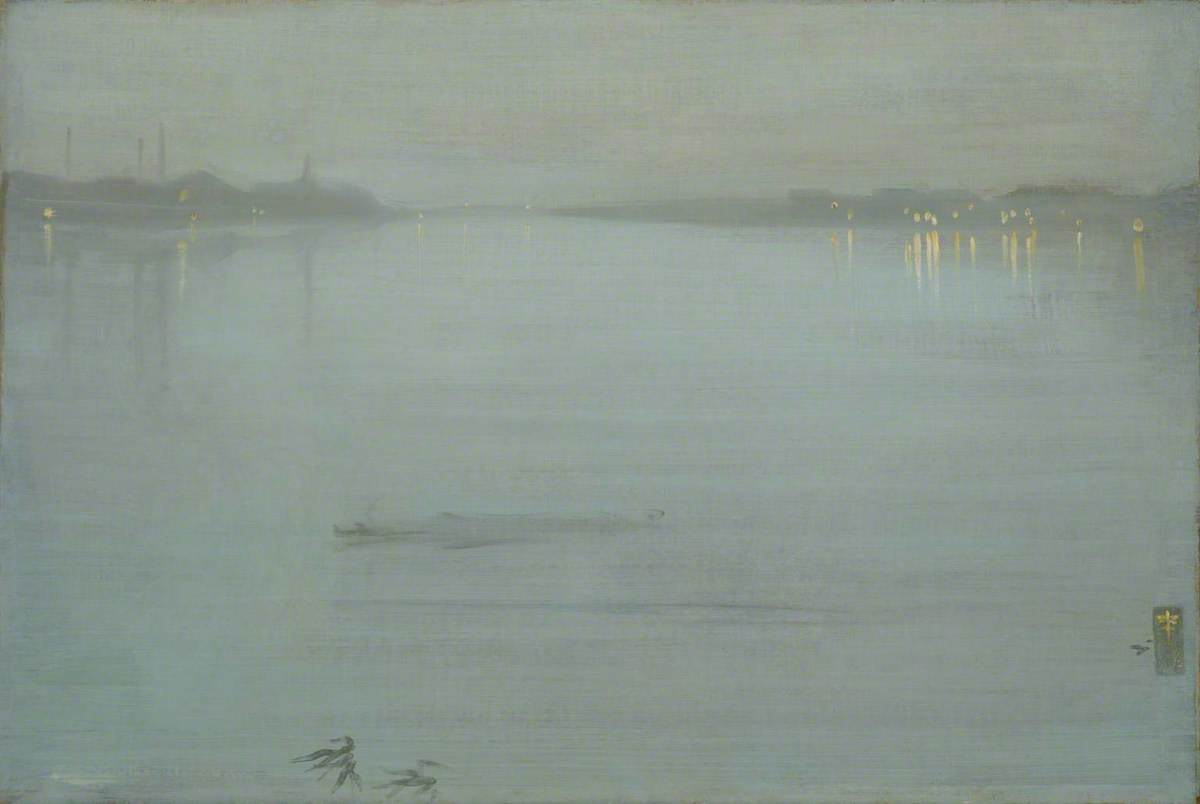
- Artist: James McNeill Whistler
- Year: 1872
- Type: Oil on canvas, landscape painting
- Dimensions: 74.3 cm × 50.2 cm (29.3 in × 19.8 in)
- Location: Tate Britain, London

Nocturne, Blue and Silver - Cremorne Lights is an 1872 landscape painting by the American-British artist James McNeill Whistler. It depicts a view of the River Thames between Battersea and Chelsea. The lights of Cremorne Gardens on the north bank give the painting its title. It was part of a series of works Whistler produced during the decade featuring views of the River Thames by night. At the suggestion of the art collector Frederick Richards Leyland, Whistler began calling them nocturnes in reference to the musical term. This was one of the earliest, when Whistler was still experimenting with different applications of paint. The painting was bequeathed to the nation by Arthur Studd in 1919 and is now in the collection of the Tate Britain in Pimlico.

== See also ==
- List of paintings by James McNeill Whistler

== Bibliography ==
- Chaleyssin, Patrick. James McNeill Whistler. Parkstone International, 2011.
- Jacobi, Carol (ed.) James McNeill Whistler. Tate Publishing, 2026.
- Sutherland, Daniel E. Whistler: A Life for Art's Sake. Yale University Press, 2014.
