= Portrait of Rosa Corder =

Painting by James McNeill Whistler

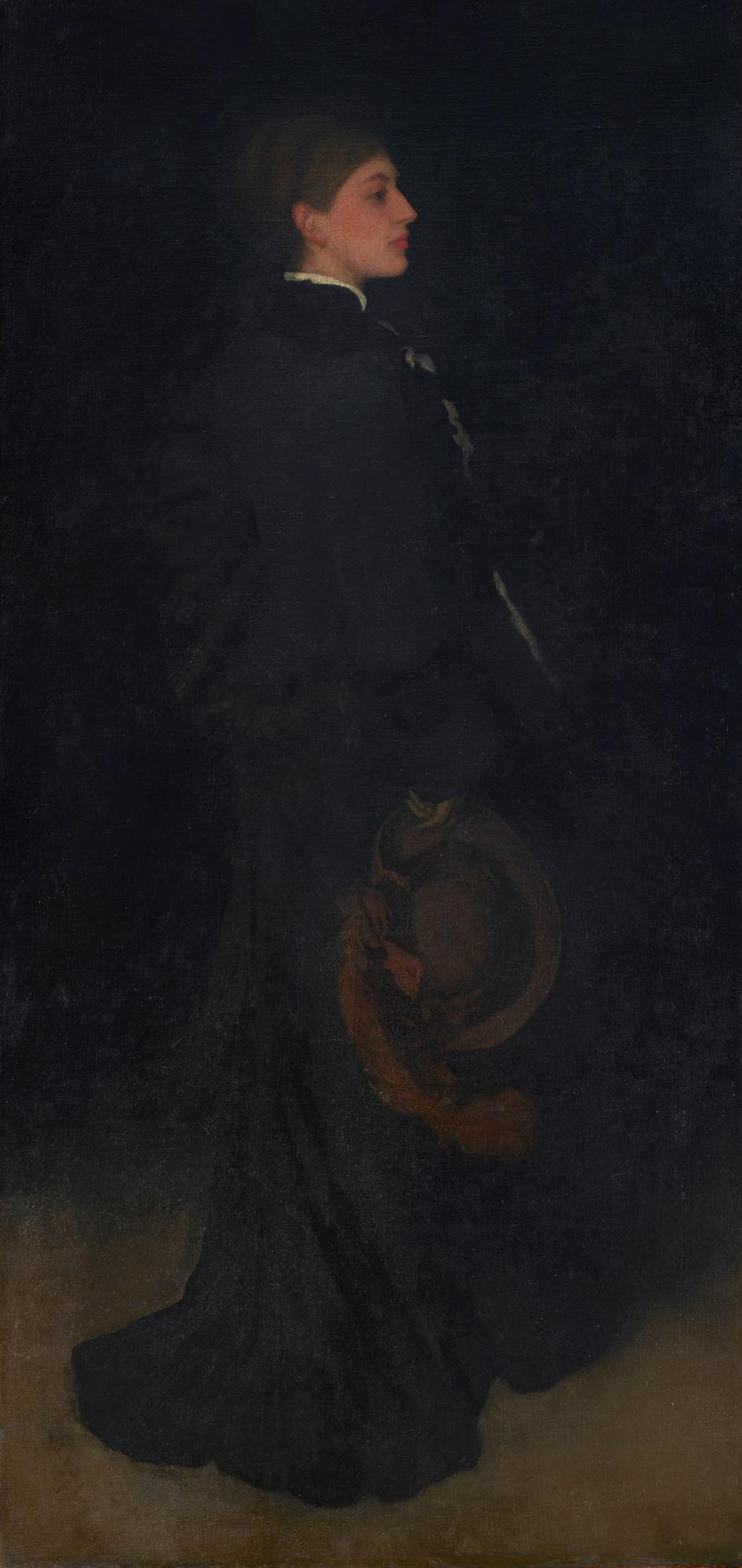
- Artist: James McNeill Whistler
- Year: c. 1876-1878
- Type: Oil on canvas, portrait painting
- Dimensions: 75.7 cm × 36.3 cm (29.8 in × 14.3 in)
- Location: Frick Collection, New York

Portrait of Rosa Corder is an oil on canvas portrait painting by the Anglo-American artist James McNeill Whistler, from c. 1876-1878. It depicts the English model and artist Rosa Corder at the age of twenty five.

== History and description ==
Whistler chose to show her at full length from the back, looking away, thus emphasising the elaborate Victorian fashion of her clothes even as he used black as the predominant colour. The picture was produced around the time he was constructing the White House in Chelsea, a residence modelled on his own Aesthetic ideals and needed urgent money to fund it. In 1880 a mezzotint based on the painting was produced by Richard Josey. This mezzotint was successfully displayed at the Royal Academy Exhibition of 1880 at Burlington House, although when Whistler saw it in Venice he was disappointed. Nonetheless, it sold very well as an engraving along with a version of Whistler's Mother.

The painting was commissioned for a hundred pounds by Whistler's agent Charles Augustus Howell, who was also Corder's lover. Whistler later violently fell out with Howell and feuded with him publicly. The picture was submitted to one of the rival Salon of 1891 exhibitions held in Paris. The painting was acquired in 1914 by the Frick Collection, in New York.

== See also ==
- List of paintings by James McNeill Whistler

== Bibliography ==
- Sutherland, Daniel E. Whistler: A Life for Art's Sake. Yale University Press, 2014.
