= Valparaiso Harbor =

1866 painting by James McNeill Whistler

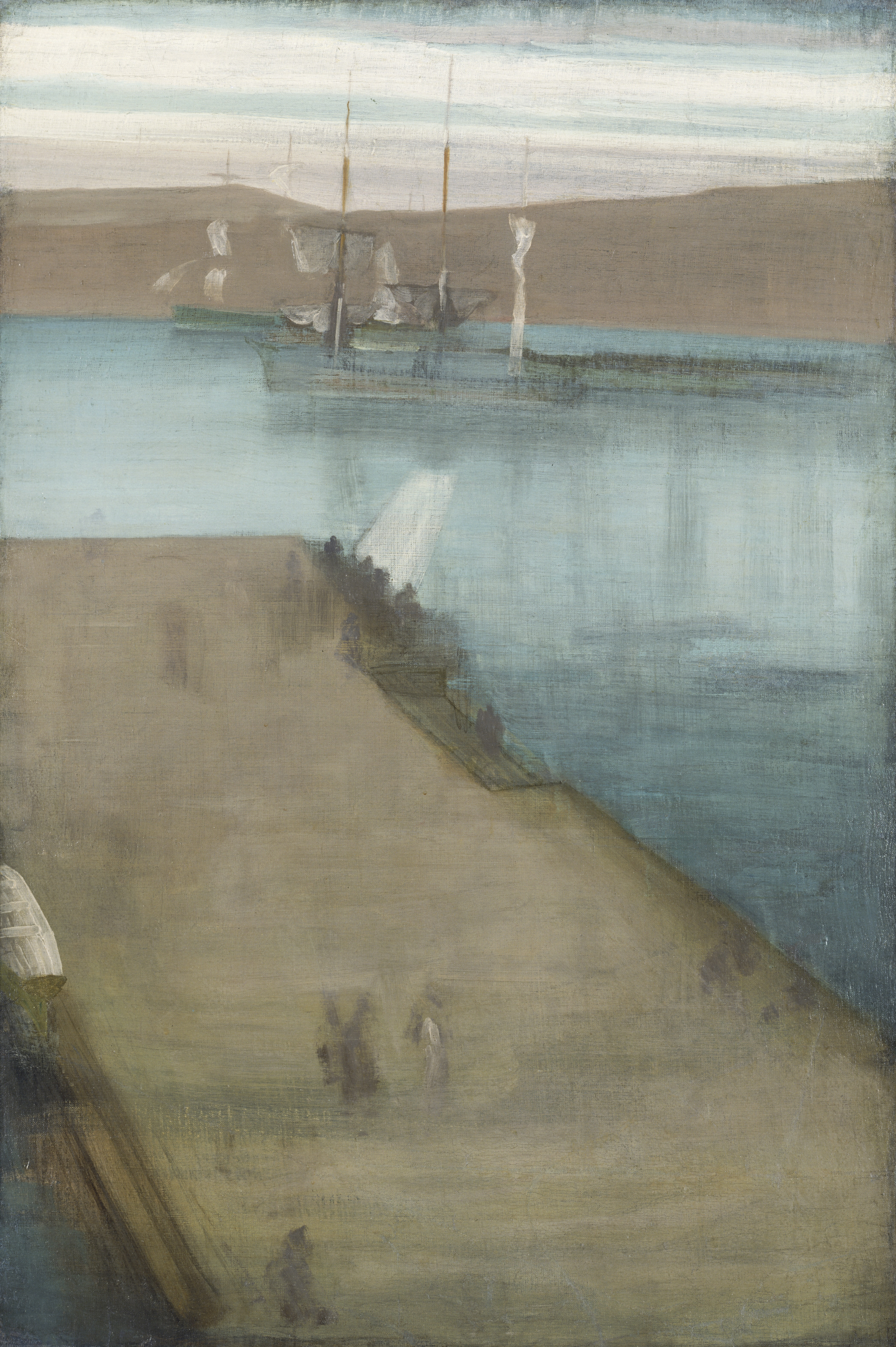
- Artist: James McNeill Whistler
- Year: 1866
- Medium: Oil on canvas
- Dimensions: 76.6 cm × 51.1 cm (30.2 in × 20.1 in)
- Location: Smithsonian American Art Museum; Washington, D.C.

Valparaiso Harbor is an oil on canvas painting of 1866 by the American aestheticism artist James McNeill Whistler.

== See also ==
- List of paintings by James McNeill Whistler
