= Sea and Rain =

Painting by James McNeill Whistler in the University of Michigan Museum of Art

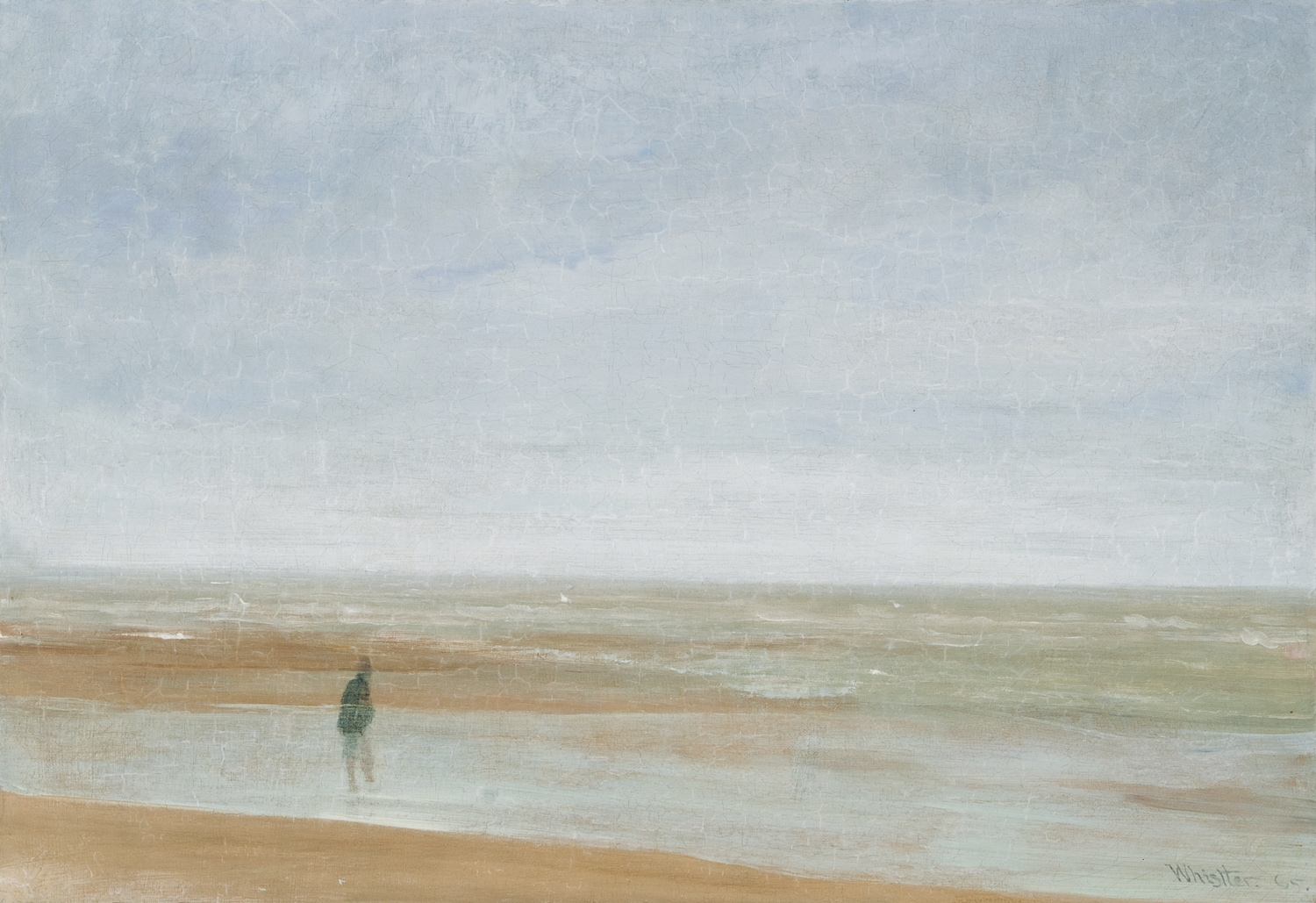
- Artist: James McNeill Whistler
- Year: 1865
- Medium: oil on canvas
- Dimensions: 53.02 cm × 73.34 cm (20.87 in × 28.87 in)
- Location: University of Michigan Museum of Art, An Arbor

Sea and Rain is a painting by James Abbott McNeill Whistler. The work is a seascape depicting a lone figure standing at the edge of the misty ocean surf during an overcast day. Whistler uses soft brushstrokes and thin layers of paint to create a dreamy atmosphere. The limited palette makes use of only four pigments: cobalt blue, iron-oxide yellow, vermilion, and bone black. Ten years later, Whistler would return to this minimalist style with his series of nocturnes.

The painting was made in the autumn of 1865, in the fishing village of Trouville-sur-Mer, between October and November. Whistler worked alongside fellow realist painter Gustave Courbet (1819–1877) at a beach resort in Trouville, with his partner Joanna Hiffernan accompanying him on the trip. By this time, Whistler had begun to move beyond the realism of Courbet and towards impressionism, but the tonal qualities of the work are rooted in a Japanese aesthetic. The painting shares similar qualities with another of Whistler's seascapes, Harmony in Blue and Silver: Trouville (1865). Sea and Rain was exhibited at the Royal Academy of Arts in London in 1867 where it was received favorably by critics.

== Related works ==
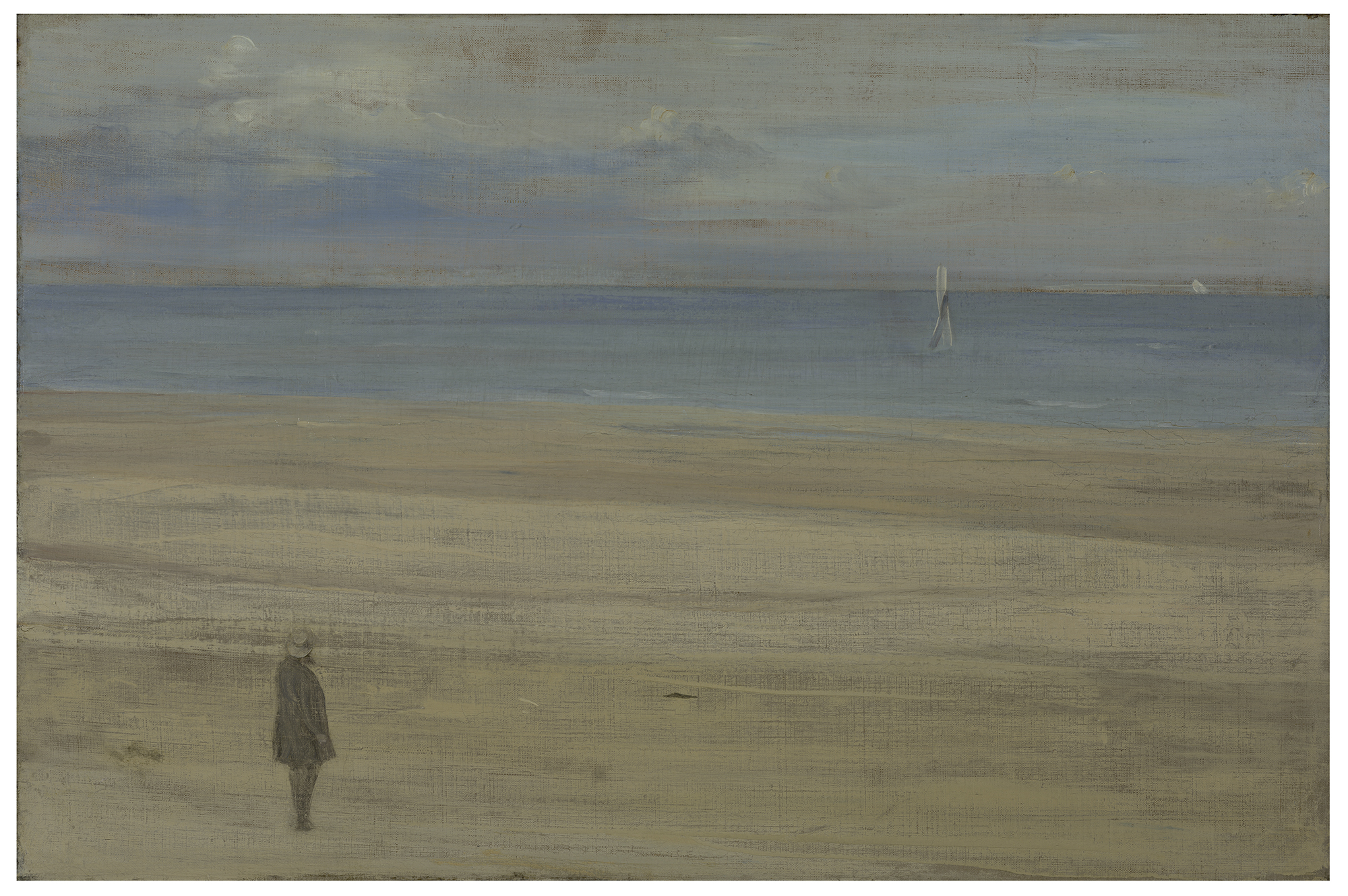
Harmony in Blue and Silver: Trouville (1865)

== See also ==
- List of paintings by James McNeill Whistler

== Bibliography ==
- Addiss, Stephen (1979). Eighty Works in the Collection of the University of Michigan Museum of Art: A Handbook. University of Michigan Museum of Art. OCLC 6303738.
- Braun, Jane (2008). "James McNeill Whistler (1834 – 1903)". Essays for Docents Project, 2007–2009. On the Occasion of UMMA's Expansion and Renovation. University of Michigan Museum of Art. Retrieved May 13, 2023.
- MacDonald, Margaret F. Grischka Petri. (2021). "YMSM 065 Sea and Rain". In James McNeill Whistler: The Paintings, A Catalogue Raisonné. University of Glasgow. Retrieved May 13, 2023.
- McNamara, Carole. John Siewart (1994). Whistler: Prosaic Views, Poetic Vision. Works on Paper from the University of Michigan Museum of Art. Thames and Hudson. University of Michigan Museum of Art. ISBN 0-500-27761-3.
- Tinterow, Gary. Henri Loyrette (1994). Origins of Impressionism Metropolitan Museum of Art. ISBN 9780870997174. OCLC 30623473.
