= Henry Irving as Philip II of Spain =

Painting by James McNeill Whistler

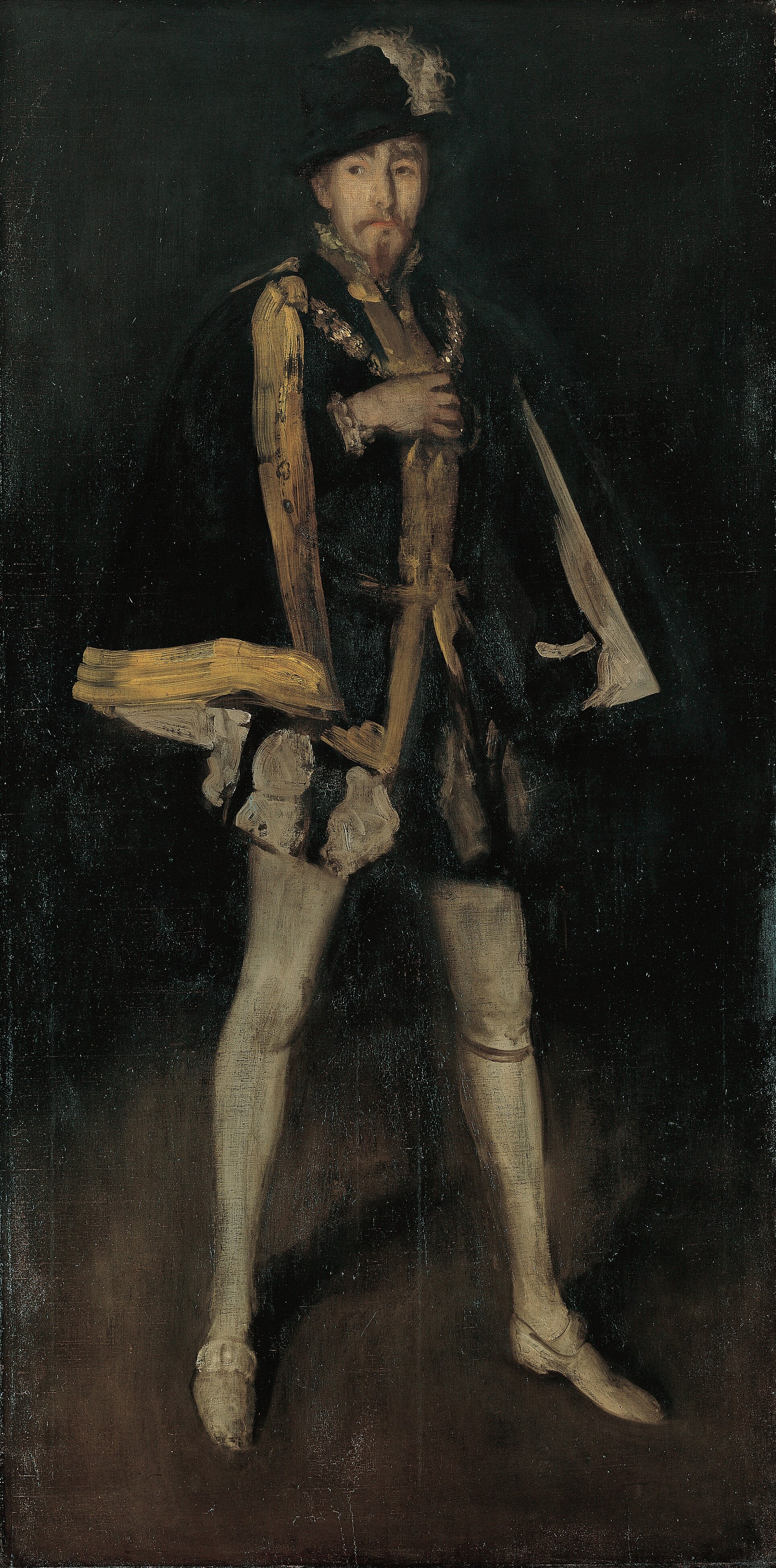
- Artist: James McNeill Whistler
- Year: 1876
- Type: Oil on canvas, portrait painting
- Dimensions: 215.3 cm × 108.6 cm (84.8 in × 42.8 in)
- Location: Metropolitan Museum of Art, New York

Arrangement in Black, No. 3: Sir Henry Irving as Philip II of Spain is an 1876 portrait painting by the American-born artist James McNeill Whistler. It depicts the English stage actor Henry Irving In costume as Philip II of Spain.

In 1876 Irving appeared at the Lyceum Theatre in the West End in Alfred Tennyson's play Queen Mary Tudor in the role of the King of Spain, husband of Mary I. Whistler asked Irving to pose for him after watching the performance. In composition the picture draws on Whistler's theory of Tonalism and also makes reference to the portraits of the Old Master Diego Velázquez.

Whistler submitted the painting to the Grosvenor Gallery Exhibition of 1877, one of eight works he submitted. The art critic William Rossetti, generally sympathetic to Whistler's work? described it as an "experiment". it was retouched by Whistler in 1885 and has belonged to the Metropolitan Museum of Art in New York City since 1910.

== See also ==
- Henry Irving as Charles I, an 1873 painting by James Archer
- List of paintings by James McNeill Whistler

== Bibliography ==
- Sutherland, Daniel E. Whistler: A Life for Art's Sake. Yale University Press, 2014.
- Tinterow, Gary & Lacambre, Geneviève. Manet/Velázquez: The French Taste for Spanish Painting. Metropolitan Museum of Art, 2003
