= The Chelsea Girl =

Painting by James McNeill Whistler

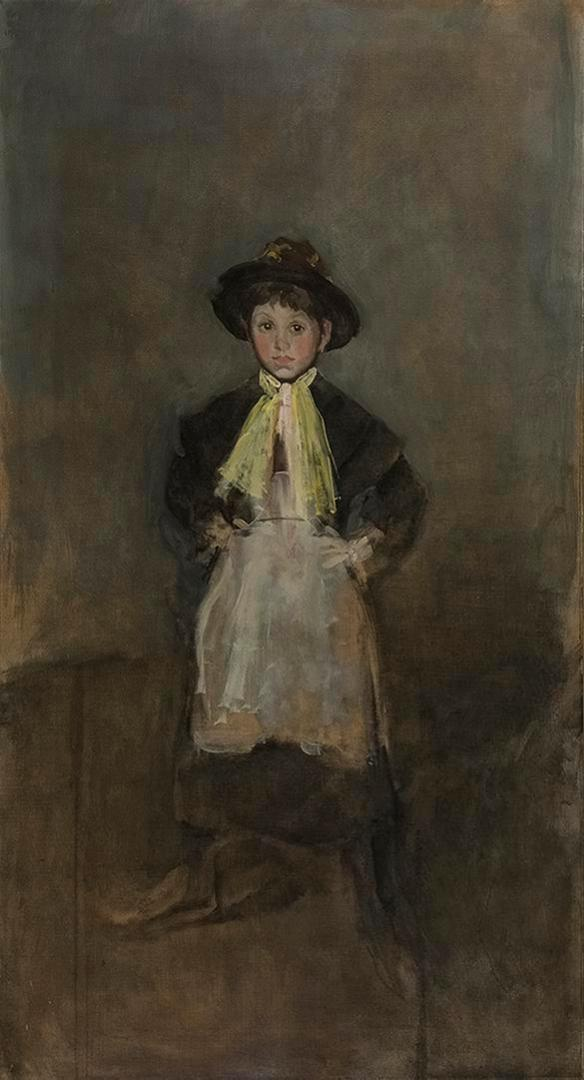
- Artist: James McNeill Whistler
- Year: 1884
- Type: Oil on canvas, portrait painting
- Dimensions: 165.1 cm × 88.9 cm (65.0 in × 35.0 in)
- Location: Crystal Bridges Museum of American Art, Arkansas

The Chelsea Girl is an 1884 oil painting by the Anglo-American artist James McNeill Whistler. It depicts a girl from Chelsea in London at full-length on a large canvas. It was unusual to show a working class child in such grand style, which was usually reserved for the upper classes at the time. Whistler may have been intrigued by her spirited personality which he captures with the bold stance. He gave the painting to Alexander Cassatt of Philadelphia as compensation for a delayed commissioned portrait. Although Whistler called it a "damn fine thing" he was irritated when it was displayed at the Chicago World's Fair in 1893 as he considered it unfinished and didn't want it to be considered representative of his work in the eyes of his Native Americans. The painting is today in the collection of the Crystal Bridges Museum of American Art in Bentonville, Arkansas having been purchased in 2014.

== See also ==
- List of paintings by James McNeill Whistler

== Bibliography ==
- Dorment, Richard & MacDonald, Margaret F. James McNeill Whistler. H.N. Abrams, 1995.
- Jacobi, Carol (ed.) James McNeill Whistler. Tate Publishing, 2026.
- Merrill, Linda. After Whistler: The Artist and His Influence on American Painting. Yale University Press, 2003.
- Sutherland, Daniel E. Whistler: A Life for Art's Sake. Yale University Press, 2014.
