= Nocturne: Blue and Silver – Chelsea =

Painting by James McNeill Whistler

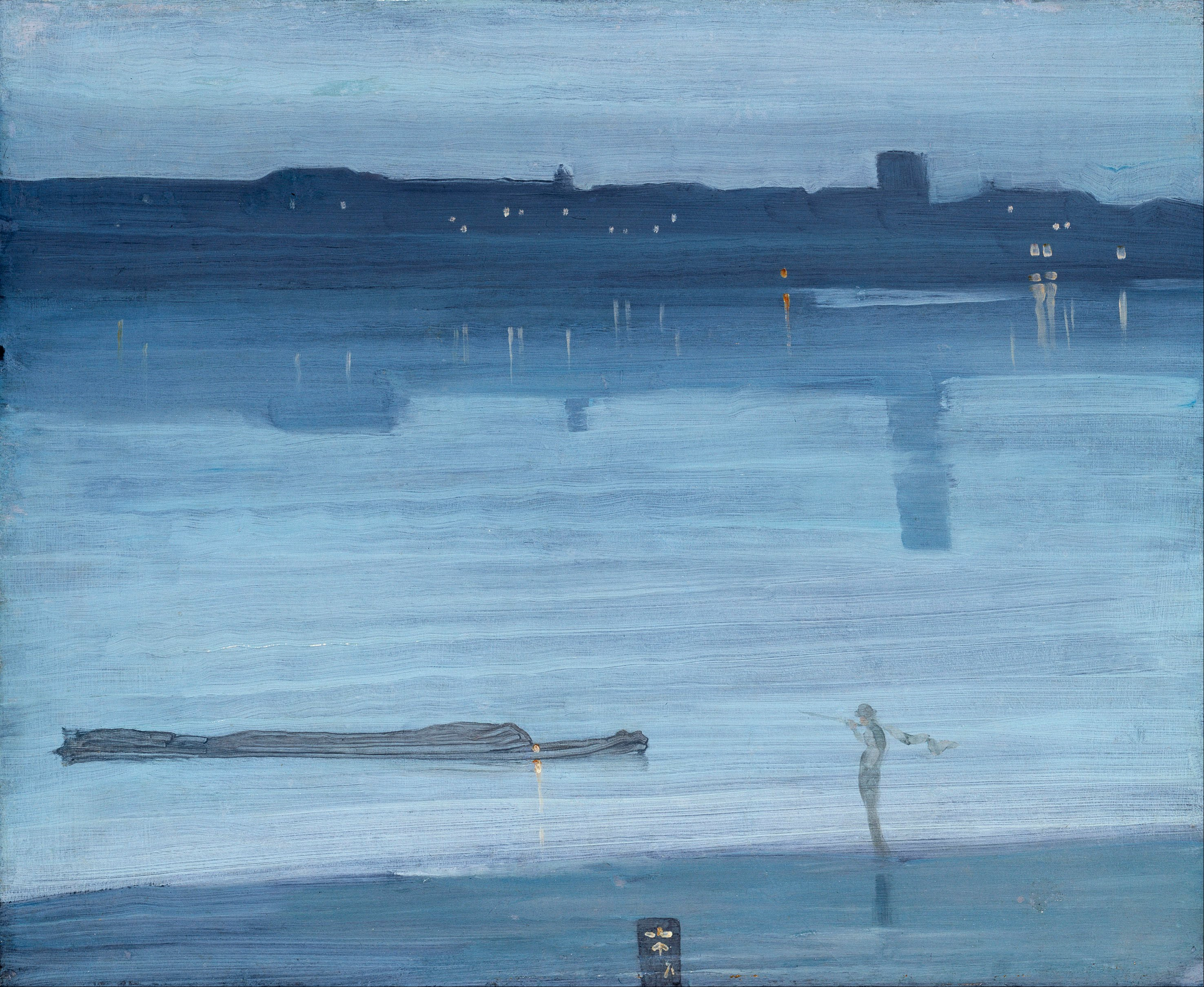
- Artist: James McNeill Whistler
- Year: 1871
- Medium: Oil on panel
- Dimensions: 50.2 cm × 60.8 cm (19.8 in × 23.9 in)
- Location: Tate Britain; London

Nocturne: Blue and Silver – Chelsea is a painting by James McNeill Whistler, completed in 1871. It is the earliest of the London Nocturnes and was conceived on the same August evening as Variations in Violet and Green. The two paintings were exhibited together at the Dudley Gallery.

== The Nocturnes ==
Blue and Silver – Chelsea is the first of 52 nighttime landscapes which Whistler began calling nocturnes after the suggestion of Frederick Richards Leyland. His process is described in detail by his biographers the Pennells:

His method was to go out at night [...] stand before his subject and look at it, then turn his back on it and repeat to whoever was with him the arrangement, the scheme of colour, and as much of the detail as he wanted. The listener corrected errors when they occurred, and, after Whistler had looked long enough, he went to bed with nothing in his head but his subject. The next morning, if he could see upon the untouched canvas the picture, he painted it, if not he passed another night looking at the subject.

All the nocturnes were painted with an extremely fluid "sauce" that allowed Whistler to build thin layers of luminous colour, sometimes painting over while the lower layer was still wet. The exact recipe of the mixture is unverified, but was reportedly so thin that the wet canvas sometimes had to be painted flat on the ground so the image would not slide off.

== Orientalism ==
The work provides an example of Orientalism, specifically Japonisme which was a significant influence on Whistler and many other Impressionists during this period. The flattened, silhouetted forms are typical of contemporaneous ukiyo-e prints. More specifically, Whistler often drew composition inspiration from One Hundred Famous Views of Edo and other works by Hiroshige and Hiroshige II. The monochromatic colour washes, visible brushstrokes, and subdued composition echo sumi-e. All this is underscored by Whistler's use of the 'butterfly' signature in the centre of the bottom edge of the painting, imitating a "chop" seal.

== Provenance ==
The painting was donated to the Tate in 1972 by Rachel and Jean Alexander, from the collection of their father William Cleverly Alexander, a banker and the son of noted abolitionist George William Alexander. W. C. Alexander was one of Whistler's earliest patrons, buying this first Nocturne in 1872.

== See also ==
- List of paintings by James McNeill Whistler
