= Battersea Reach (painting) =

Painting by James McNeill Whistler

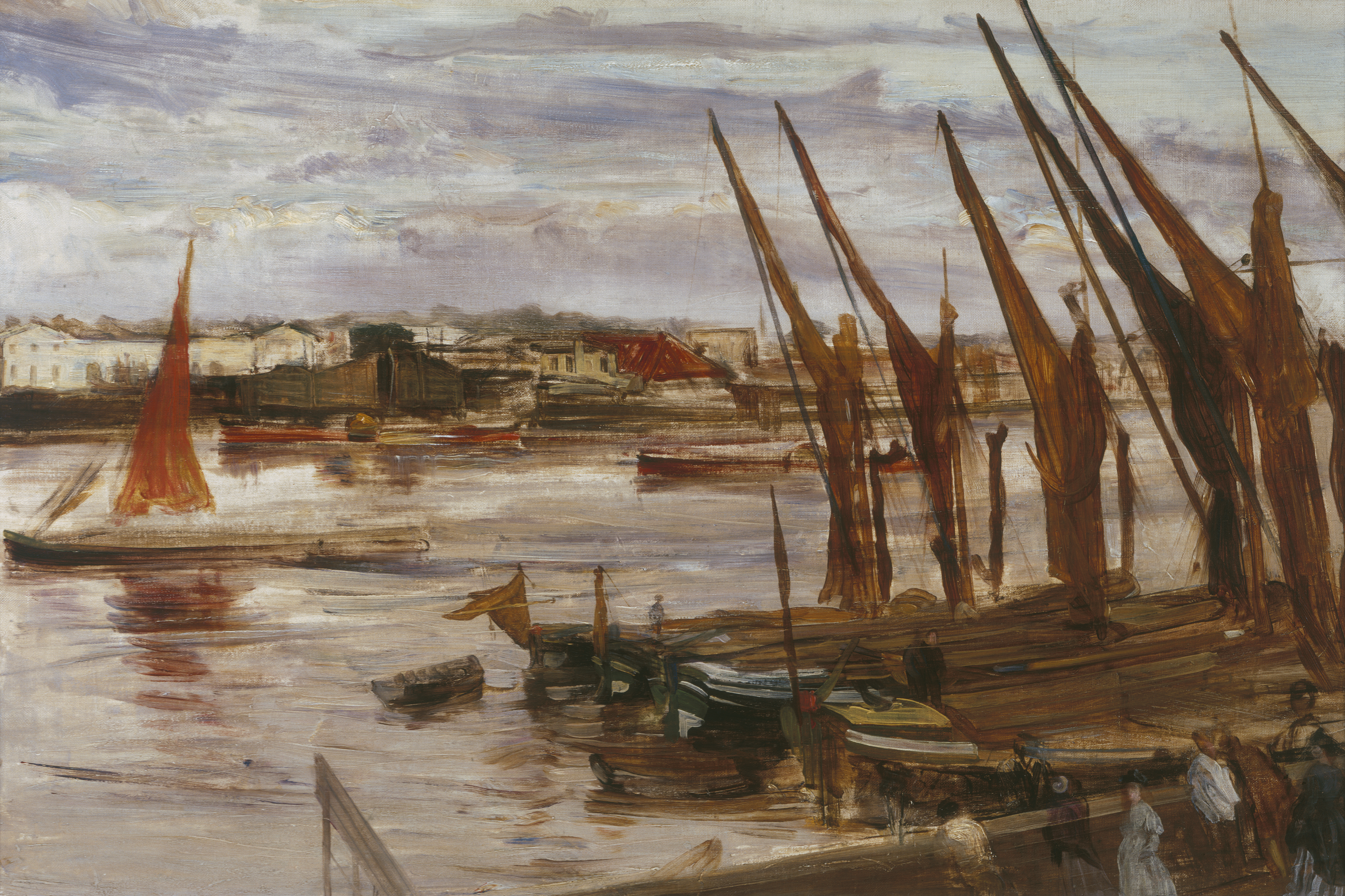
- Artist: James McNeill Whistler
- Year: 1863
- Type: Oil on canvas, landscape painting
- Dimensions: 50.8 cm × 76.4 cm (20.0 in × 30.1 in)
- Location: National Gallery of Art, Washington D.C.

Battersea Reach is an 1863 cityscape oil painting by the American artist James McNeill Whistler. It depicts a view of the bustling traffic on the River Thames as it passes Battersea on the southern bank. After a spell living in Paris, Whistler had settled in London in 1859. While he initially lived downriver near Wapping he later relocated to Chelsea. During the decade he produced a number of views of the River Thames.

Whistler sold it for £30 to one of his early patrons George Cavafy who had also bought his The Last of Old Westminster. The painting is now in the collection of the National Gallery of Art in Washington D.C., having previously belonged to the city's Corcoran Gallery of Art.

== Bibliography ==
- Jacobi, Carol (ed.) James McNeill Whistler. Tate Publishing, 2026.
- Spalding, Frances. Whistler. Phaidon, 1994.
- Sutherland, Daniel E. Whistler: A Life for Art's Sake. Yale University Press, 2014.
