= Portrait of Robert de Montesquiou (Whistler) =

Painting by James McNeill Whistler

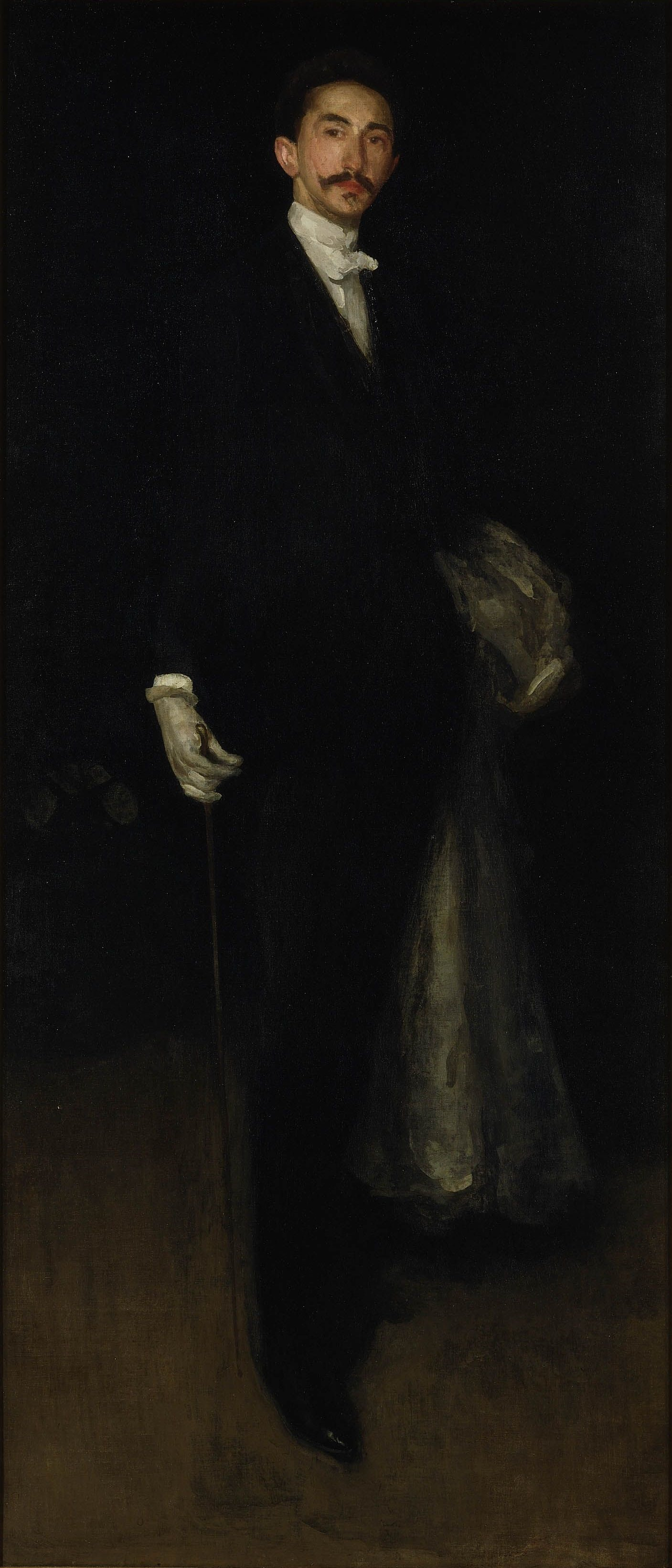
- Artist: James McNeill Whistler
- Year: 1891–92
- Type: Oil on canvas, portrait painting
- Dimensions: 208.6 cm × 91.8 cm (82.1 in × 36.1 in)
- Location: Frick Collection, New York City

Portrait of Robert de Montesquiou is an 1892 portrait painting by the Anglo-American artist James McNeill Whistler. It depicts the French aristocrat and dandy Robert de Montesquiou. A poet and art collector he was associated with the Symbolist movement. It is also known by the longer alternative title Arrangement in Black and Gold: Comte Robert de Montesquiou-Fezensac, a reference to Whistler's theories of Tonalism.

The two men were well-acquainted and Whistler arranged for the Frenchman to see The Peacock Room he had designed. The painting was produced during the brief period when Whistler had shifted his studio from London to Paris. It featured at the Salon of 1894 staged by the Société Nationale des Beaux-Arts in Paris. Today it is part of the Frick Collection in New York, having been acquired in 1914 and marked the most modern of Henry Clay Frick's purchases.

== See also ==
- Portrait of Robert de Montesquiou, an 1897 painting by Giovanni Boldini
- List of paintings by James McNeill Whistler

== Bibliography ==
- Chaleyssin, Patrick & Charles, Victoria. James McNeill Whistler. Parkstone International, 2011.
- Jullian, Philippe. Robert de Montesquiou: A Prince of the Nineties. Secker & Warburg, 1967.
- Merrill, Linda. After Whistler: The Artist and His Influence on American Painting. Yale University Press, 2003.
- Sutherland, Daniel E. Whistler: A Life for Art's Sake. Yale University Press, 2014.
