= The Balcony (Whistler) =

Painting by James McNeill Whistler

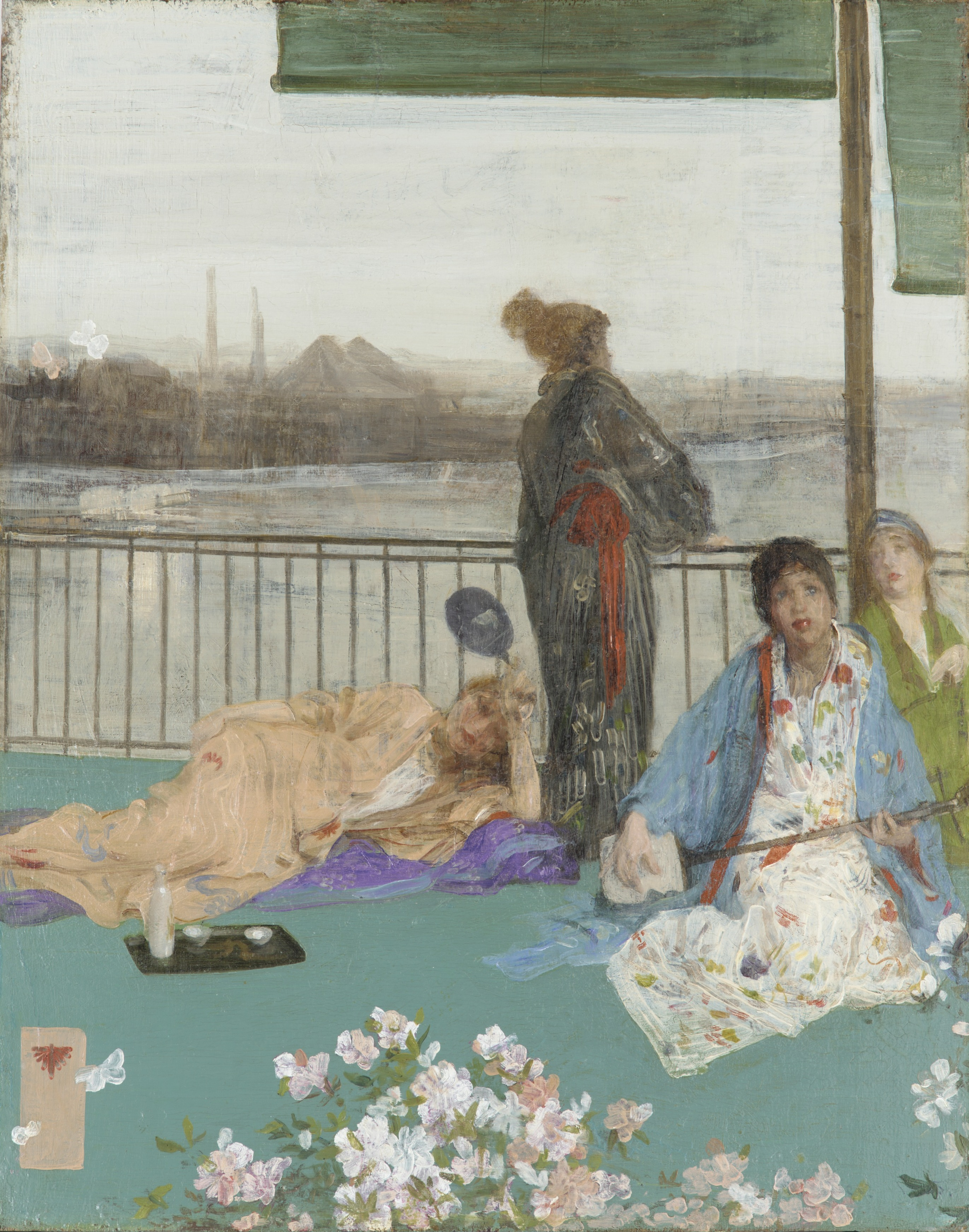
- Artist: James McNeill Whistler
- Year: 1864
- Type: Oil on canvas, genre painting
- Dimensions: 61.4 cm × 48.8 cm (24.2 in × 19.2 in)
- Location: Freer Gallery of Art, Washington D.C.

The Balcony also known as Variations in Flesh Colour and Green is an 1864 oil painting by the American artist James McNeill Whistler. It features four young woman on a balcony wearing kimonos. This reflected the fashionable Japonisme in European art that followed the Perry Expedition which opened up Japan following centuries of isolation from the world. One of the woman, his regular model Joanna Hiffernan, is strumming a Japanese lute. In the background he incongruously added a landscape featuring Battersea, across the River Thames from Chelsea where he lived. The juxtaposition of an the industrial buildings and water traffic of Battersea, representing Victorian Britain, with the Orientalist figures in the foreground has led to speculation as to whether Whistler intended to convey a message.

The painting was displayed at the Royal Academy Exhibition of 1870 held Burlington House in Piccadilly, although the critical response to more limited and mixed than the major impact he hoped for. He showed it again at the Grosvenor Gallery Exhibition of 1878 in Bond Street Today it is part of the collection of the Freer Gallery of Art, part of the wider Smithsonian Institution in Washington.

== See also ==
- List of paintings by James McNeill Whistler

== Bibliography ==
- Jacobi, Carol (ed.) James McNeill Whistler. Tate Publishing, 2026.
- Sutherland, Daniel E. Whistler: A Life for Art's Sake. Yale University Press, 2014.
