= The Last of Old Westminster =

Painting by James McNeill Whistler

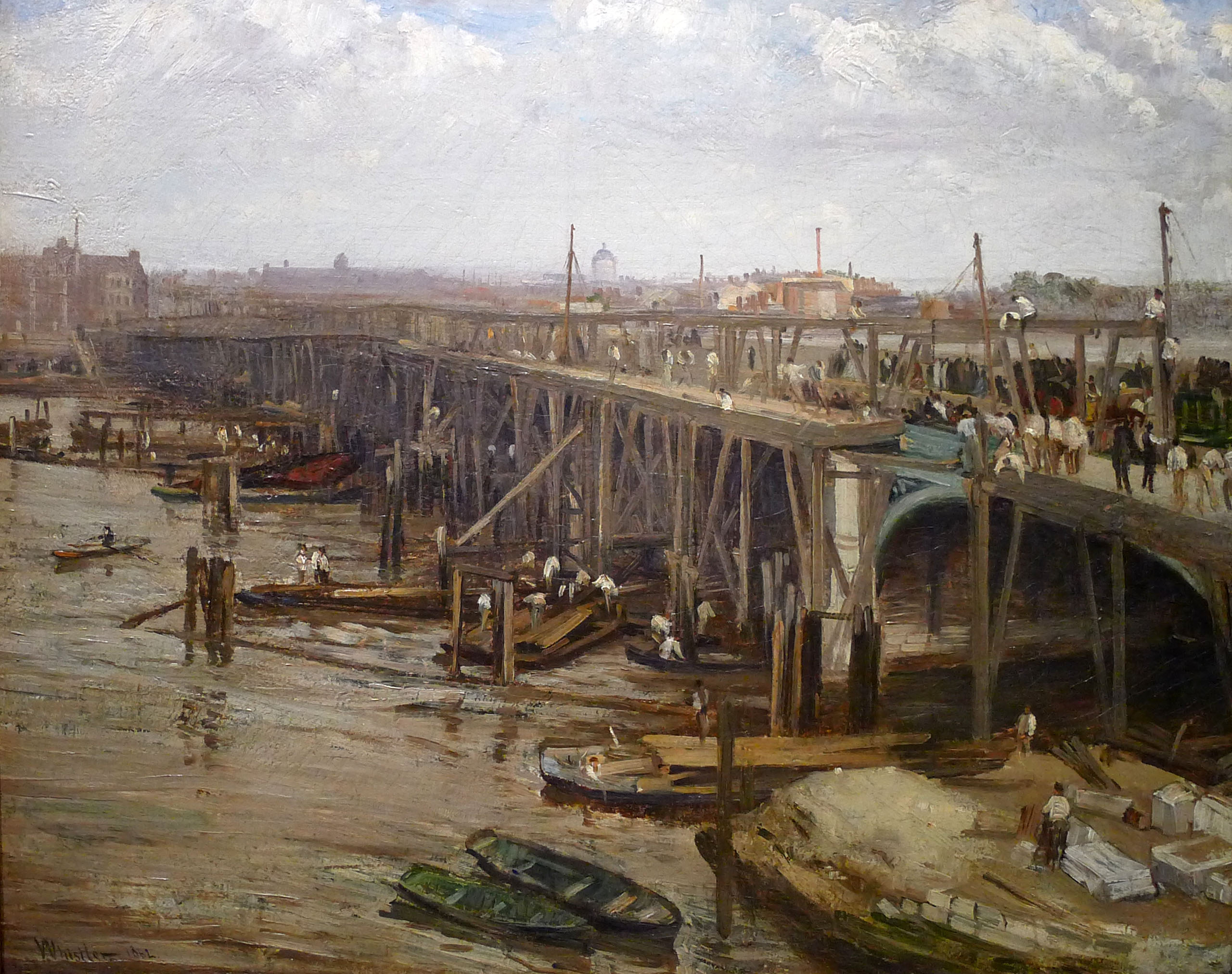
- Artist: James McNeill Whistler
- Year: 1862
- Type: Oil on canvas, landscape painting
- Dimensions: 60.9 cm × 78.1 cm (24.0 in × 30.7 in)
- Location: Museum of Fine Arts, Boston

The Last of Old Westminster is an 1862 landscape painting by the Anglo-American artist James McNeill Whistler. It depicts a view of the new Westminster Bridge across the River Thames under construction. After spending some years in Paris, Whistler relocated to London and produced many paintings and etchings of scenes on the Thames. Whistler was at this point still strongly influenced by the ideas Realism emphasised by Gustave Courbet, although his style was often electic.

The original Westminster Bridge was constructed in 1750 but by the mid-Victorian era needed replacing and a new design was produced by Thomas Page. The painting was displayed at the Royal Academy Exhibition of 1863 at the National Gallery in London. Whistler sold it to George Cavafy for £30. The picture is now in the Museum of Fine Arts in Boston, having been acquired in 1939.

== See also ==
- List of paintings by James McNeill Whistler

== Bibliography ==
- Jacobi, Carol (ed.) James McNeill Whistler. Tate Publishing, 2026.
- Sutherland, Daniel E. Whistler: A Life for Art's Sake. Yale University Press, 2014.
