= The Thames in Ice =

Painting by James McNeill Whistler

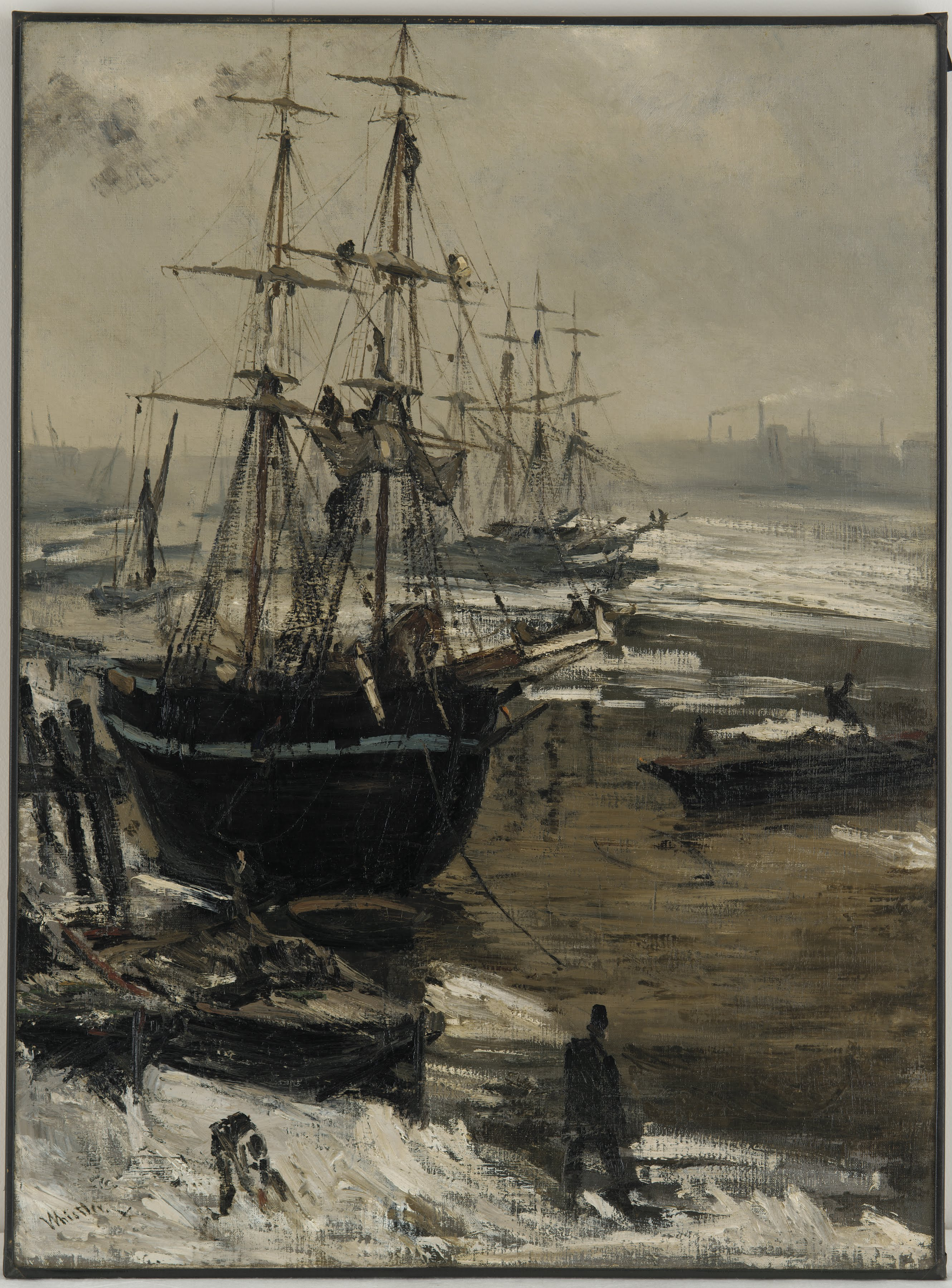
- Artist: James McNeill Whistler
- Year: 1860
- Type: Oil on canvas, landscape painting
- Dimensions: 74.6 cm × 55.3 cm (29.4 in × 21.8 in)
- Location: Freer Gallery of Art, Washington D.C.

The Thames in Ice is an 1860 landscape painting by the American artist James McNeill Whistler featuring a winter view of the River Thames in London. Whistler had returned to London from Paris the previous year. On the morning of Christmas Day he went out to the view the Thames which has frozen over in the bitter cold, trapping ships. He produced this painting from a balcony of an inn at Rotherhithe and completed it in three days.

Whistler did not think it was a suitable subject to follow up his previous success At the Piano for the upcoming Royal Academy Exhibition of 1861 and instead chose to work on The Music Room, although in the event that was ultimately not submitted either. Whistler sold the painting for £10, a considerable sum so early in his career. It was then displayed at the Royal Academy Exhibition of 1862 at the National Gallery. He subsequently submitted it to the Salon of 1867 in Paris. The picture is now in the collection of the Freer Gallery of Art in Washington D.C..

== See also ==
- List of paintings by James McNeill Whistler

== Bibliography ==
- Jacobi, Carol (ed.) James McNeill Whistler. Tate Publishing, 2026.
- Robinson, Alan. Imagining London, 1770-1900. Palgrave Macmillan UK, 2004.
- Sutherland, Daniel E. Whistler: A Life for Art's Sake. Yale University Press, 2014.
