= Interior (Degas) =

Painting by Edgar Degas

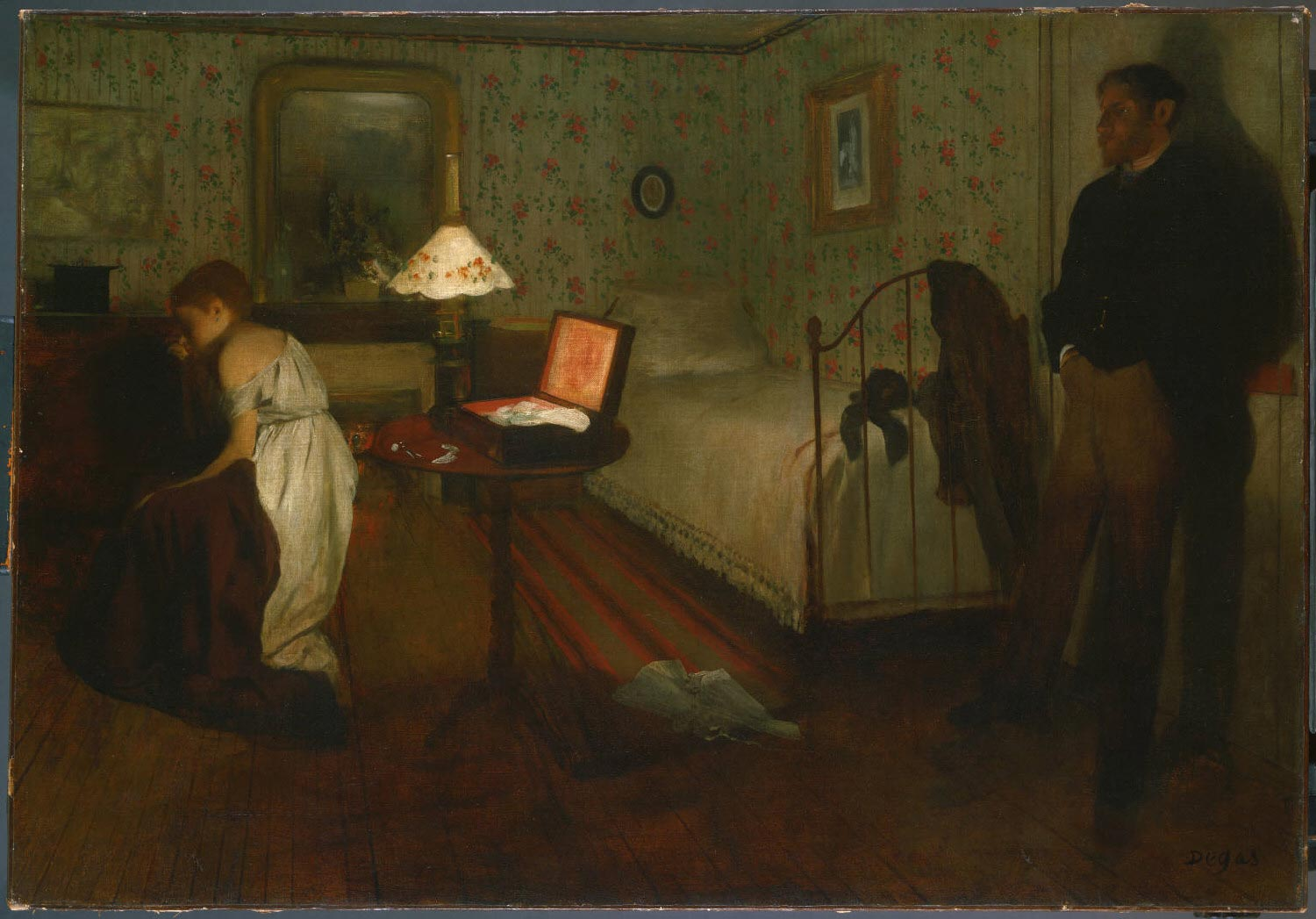
- Artist: Edgar Degas
- Year: 1868–1869
- Medium: Oil on canvas
- Dimensions: 81.3 cm × 114.3 cm (32 in × 45 in)
- Location: Philadelphia Museum of Art, Philadelphia

Interior (French: Intérieur), also known as The Rape (French: Le Viol), is an oil painting on canvas by Edgar Degas (1834–1917), painted in 1868–1869. Described as "the most puzzling of Degas's major works", it depicts a tense confrontation by lamplight between a man and a partially undressed woman. The theatrical character of the scene has led art historians to seek a literary source for the composition, but none of the sources proposed has met with universal acceptance. Even the painting's title is uncertain; acquaintances of the artist referred to it either as Le Viol or Intérieur, and it was under the latter title that Degas exhibited it for the first time in 1905. The painting is housed in the Philadelphia Museum of Art.

== Background ==
Degas painted Interior at a time when his growing commitment to Realism had led him away from his earlier preoccupation with historical subjects such as Sémiramis Building Babylon (1860–1862), Young Spartans Exercising (ca.1860), and the painting that marked his Salon debut, Scene of War in the Middle Ages (1865). His new direction was apparent by the time he exhibited Scene from the Steeplechase: The Fallen Jockey, which depicted a contemporary scene, in the Salon of 1866. Degas probably intended to submit Interior for exhibition in the Salon of 1869, but it was not shown publicly until June 1905, when it was displayed at Galerie Durand-Ruel in Paris. Degas referred to the work in 1897 as "mon tableau de genre" ("my genre painting"), which suggests that he considered the painting anomalous among his works.

== Interpretation ==
Interior has been described as "the most theatrical of all Degas's compositions of modern life". Art historians have written of the work's "distinctly stage-managed character: items are arranged as if they are props, while the dramatic lighting increases the impression that a play is being enacted.... In addition to the mysterious subject-matter, this stage-like effect is presumably one of the chief reasons why scholars have repeatedly tried to identify a literary source for the painting." Various Naturalist novels have been put forward for consideration. Georges Rivière, a friend of the Impressionists, first suggested Louis Edmond Duranty's novel, The Struggle of Françoise Duquesnoy, as a source; the idea was accepted by R. H. Wilenski and others but found unsatisfactory by Duranty experts. Later, a scene within Émile Zola's Madeleine Férat was identified as matching the elements of Degas's painting in several particulars—but while the narrow bed and the round table corresponded, the position of the figures relative to each other did not.

In 1976, art historian Theodore Reff published his conjecture that "the most important, but perhaps not the only literary source for Interior" was Zola's novel Thérèse Raquin. This idea has been widely, but not universally, accepted by other scholars. Thérèse Raquin, published in 1867, tells the story of a young orphan whose aunt has forced her to marry her sickly son, Camille Raquin. Thérèse enters into an affair with one of Camille's friends, Laurent, and the two carry out a plot to murder Camille, staging the death to look like an accident. Later, on their wedding night, Thérèse and Laurent find their relationship poisoned by guilt.

The passage that has been deemed to correspond closely to the scene depicted by Degas occurs at the beginning of Chapter 21 of Zola's novel:

Laurent carefully closed the door behind him and remained there a moment, leaning against it, staring into the room with an anxious, confused expression.

A bright fire was burning in the grate, casting golden patches that danced over the ceiling and the walls. The room was thus illuminated by a brilliant, vacillating glow which dimmed the lamp set on a table. Madame Raquin had tried to arrange the room attractively, all white and scented, as though to serve as a nest for young lovers; the old shopkeeper had chosen to add to the bed a few bits of lace and to fill the vases on the mantel with big bouquets of roses. A gentle warmth lingered in the air, with soft odors....

Thérèse was sitting in a low chair, to the right of the fireplace. Chin in hand, she was staring fixedly at the dancing flames, and did not turn her head when Laurent entered the room. Wearing a lace-edged petticoat and bed-jacket, she looked particularly pale in the bright firelight. Her jacket had slipped from one shoulder which showed pink through the locks of her black hair.

Laurent took a few steps, not speaking. He removed his jacket and vest. In shirtsleeves, he glanced again at Thérèse, who had not stirred. He seemed to hesitate. Then he noticed the pink shoulder, and bent down to press his trembling lips against that bit of bare skin. The young woman pulled her shoulder away, turning around abruptly. She stared at Laurent with a gaze so strangely mingling repugnance and dread that he stepped back, troubled and uneasy, as if overcome with terror and disgust himself.

Reff attributed certain elements in the painting that are not mentioned in the text (e.g., the sewing box, and the corset on the floor) to artistic license, and perhaps the influence of a second literary text.

Paul Gavarni, Les Lorettes, plate 5, lithograph published in Le Charivari, October 2, 1841

In 2007, Felix Krämer published an article taking issue with Reff's conclusions. In particular, Krämer wrote of the "critical" discrepancy between the marital bedroom described by Zola and the narrow, single bed in the painting; in addition, the placement of the man's top hat on the bureau in the background suggests that the man has not just entered the room, as Laurent has in the passage quoted above.

Krämer instead proposed as the "most obvious source" of Degas's composition a lithograph by Paul Gavarni: sheet number five from the Lorettes series, published in 1841 in Le Charivari. Gavarni was an artist greatly admired by Degas, who amassed a collection of some 2,000 of Gavarni's lithographs. Points of similarity between the print and Interior are described by Krämer:

As in Degas's Le Viol, [the woman] has her back turned towards the man who stands in front of the door, his legs spread wide and his hands in his pockets. From above, as if contemplating his prize, his gaze is fixed on the woman who, significantly, is seated on an animal-skin rug. Not only is the man's posture reminiscent of Degas's painting, but the woman is also in a comparable pose, her right hand raised to her head, her garment sliding off her shoulder. Even the pictures on the wall and the discarded clothes on the sofa could have inspired Degas.

Gavarni's print depicts a prostitute; the title Lorettes is a reference to the Paris neighborhood of Notre-Dame de la Lorette, home to many prostitutes. As described in 1841 by Maurice Alhoy in Physiologie de la Lorette, these women lived in hotels and carried their few belongings in small suitcases, always including a sewing kit that was indispensable to the "Lorettes" for maintaining their appearance. According to Krämer, the prominence given the sewing box in Interior, together with indications of blood on the bed, bolster the case that Interior is a scene depicting prostitution and the aftermath of sexual violence, rather than marital discord.

== Influence ==
The influence of Interior has been noted in the compositions of Degas's protégé Walter Sickert, specifically in the latter's The Camden Town Murder series of 1908 and his painting Ennui of 1914. In a conversation with Sickert, Degas described Interior as a genre painting and, as in the older artist's example, Sickert's depictions of men and women together are marked by dramatic tension and narrative ambiguity.

== Sources ==
- Armstrong, Carol (1991). Odd Man Out: Readings of the Work and Reputation of Edgar Degas. Chicago and London: University of Chicago Press. ISBN 0-226-02695-7.
- Baumann, Felix; Karabelnik, Marianne, eds. (1994). Degas Portraits. London: Merrell Holberton. ISBN 1-85894-014-1.
- Boggs, Jean Sutherland, ed. (1988). Degas. New York: The Metropolitan Museum of Art. ISBN 0-87099-519-7.
- Danto, Arthur (December 12, 1988), "Degas", The Nation: 658
- Gordon, Robert; Forge, Andrew (1988). Degas. New York: H. N. Abrams. ISBN 0-8109-1142-6.
- Krämer, Felix (May 2007), "Mon tableau de genre': Degas's 'Le Viol' and Gavarni's 'Lorette", The Burlington Magazine, 149 (1250)
- Reff, Theodore (1976). Degas: The Artist's Mind. New York: The Metropolitan Museum of Art. ISBN 9780870991462. Ch. V. "My Genre Painting".
- Thomson, Richard (1988). Degas, the Nudes. London: Thames and Hudson. ISBN 0-500-23509-0.
