= The Bellelli Family =

Painting by Edgar Degas

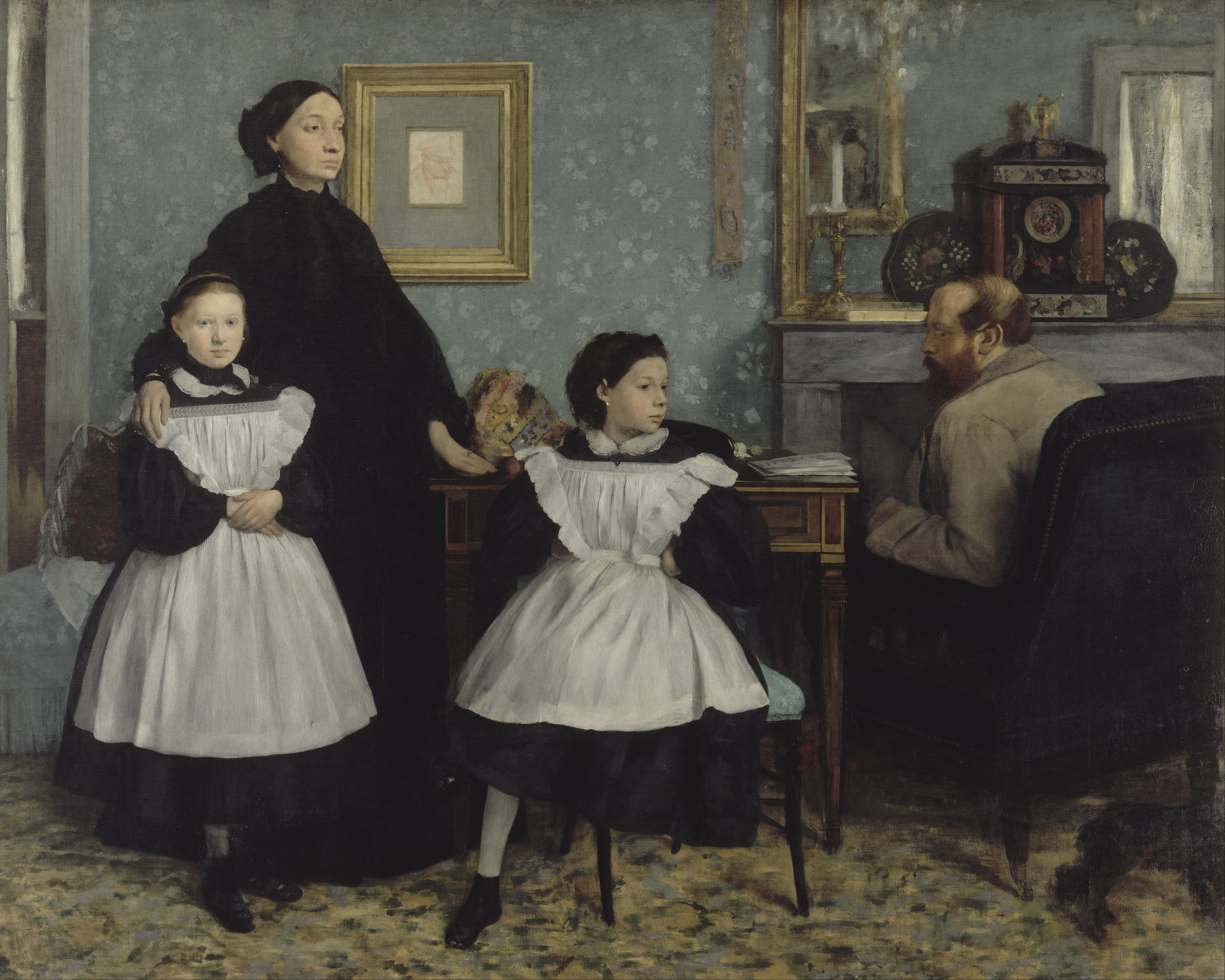
- Artist: Edgar Degas
- Year: 1858–1867
- Medium: Oil on canvas
- Movement: Realism
- Dimensions: 200 cm × 253 cm (79 in × 100 in)
- Location: Musée d'Orsay, Paris

The Bellelli Family, also known as Family Portrait, is an oil painting on canvas by Edgar Degas (1834–1917), painted c. 1858–1867, It is housed in the Musée d'Orsay, in Paris. A masterwork of Degas' youth, it is a portrait of his aunt, her husband, and their two young daughters.

While finishing his artistic training in Italy, Degas drew and painted his aunt Laura, her husband the baron Gennaro Bellelli (1812–1864), and their daughters Giulia and Giovanna. Although it is not known for certain when or where Degas executed the painting, it is believed that he utilized studies done in Italy to complete the work after his return to Paris. Laura, his father's sister, is depicted in a dress which symbolizes mourning for her father, who had recently died and appears in the framed portrait behind her. The baron was an Italian patriot exiled from Naples, living in Florence.

Laura Bellelli's countenance is dignified and austere, her gesture connected with those of her daughters. Her husband, by contrast, appears to be separated from his family. His association with business and the outside world is implied by his position at his desk. Giulia holds a livelier pose than that of her sister Giovanna, whose restraint appears to underscore the familial tensions.

== Background ==
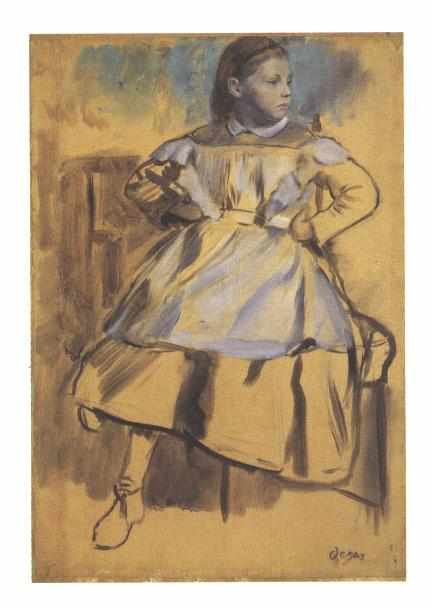
Oil sketch of Giulia.

In 1856 Degas left his home in Paris to study art and visit family relations in Italy, arriving in Naples on 17 July. In 1857 he traveled between Naples, where he stayed with his grandfather, Hilaire Degas, and Rome. At the end of July 1858 Laura Bellelli wrote to Degas from Naples, inviting him to stay with her in Florence; it was there that Gennaro Bellelli, who had been a political journalist supporting the fight for Italy's independence, took refuge from Austrian persecution after defeat of the Revolution of 1848. Degas arrived in Florence by 4 August, living with his uncle Gennaro and making studies in the Uffizi. By September he had become bored, did not get along well with Gennaro, and remained only to see Laura, Giovanna, and Giulia, who had prolonged their stay in Naples following the death of Degas' grandfather Hilaire on 31 August.

That there were strains within the Bellelli household at the time was almost certainly noticed by Degas, and confirmed by another uncle: "The domestic life of the family in Florence is a source of unhappiness for us. As I predicted, one of them is very much at fault and our sister a little, too." Laura subsequently confided to Degas that, living in exile, she missed her Neapolitan family, and further, that her husband was "immensely disagreeable and dishonest... Living with Gennaro, whose detestable nature you know and who has no serious occupation, shall soon lead me to the grave." Laura Bellelli was pregnant at the time, and it has been suggested that this circumstance, and the subsequent death of the child in infancy, may have contributed to her unhappiness and to domestic tensions in general. These conflicts would provide both background and content for the painting.

== Process ==
After his aunt and cousins returned in early November 1858, Degas undertook a series of works that would eventually culminate in The Bellelli Family. It appears that he initially planned to paint a vertical composition depicting his aunt and her two daughters in a pyramidical grouping. He painted his cousins in their black dresses and white pinafores, while his father wrote letters from Paris, offering advice on how best to proceed with the project, and impatiently awaited his return. Degas wrote of Giulia and Giovanna:

"The elder one was in fact a little beauty. The younger one, on the other hand, was smart as can be and kind as an angel. I am painting them in mourning dress and small white aprons, which suit them very well…I would like to express a certain natural grace together with a nobility that I don't know how to define...."

At year's end, Degas stopped work on the double portrait of his young cousins in order to begin a larger painting; it is unclear whether he was undertaking The Bellelli Family itself, or making preparatory sketches.

The preparatory works include portrait studies and compositional details in pencil, pastel, and oil. One drawing indicates Degas' initial intention to have Gennaro Bellelli seated at the end of the table, and an oil sketch placed him standing behind his daughters; finally, Degas painted him in the armchair.

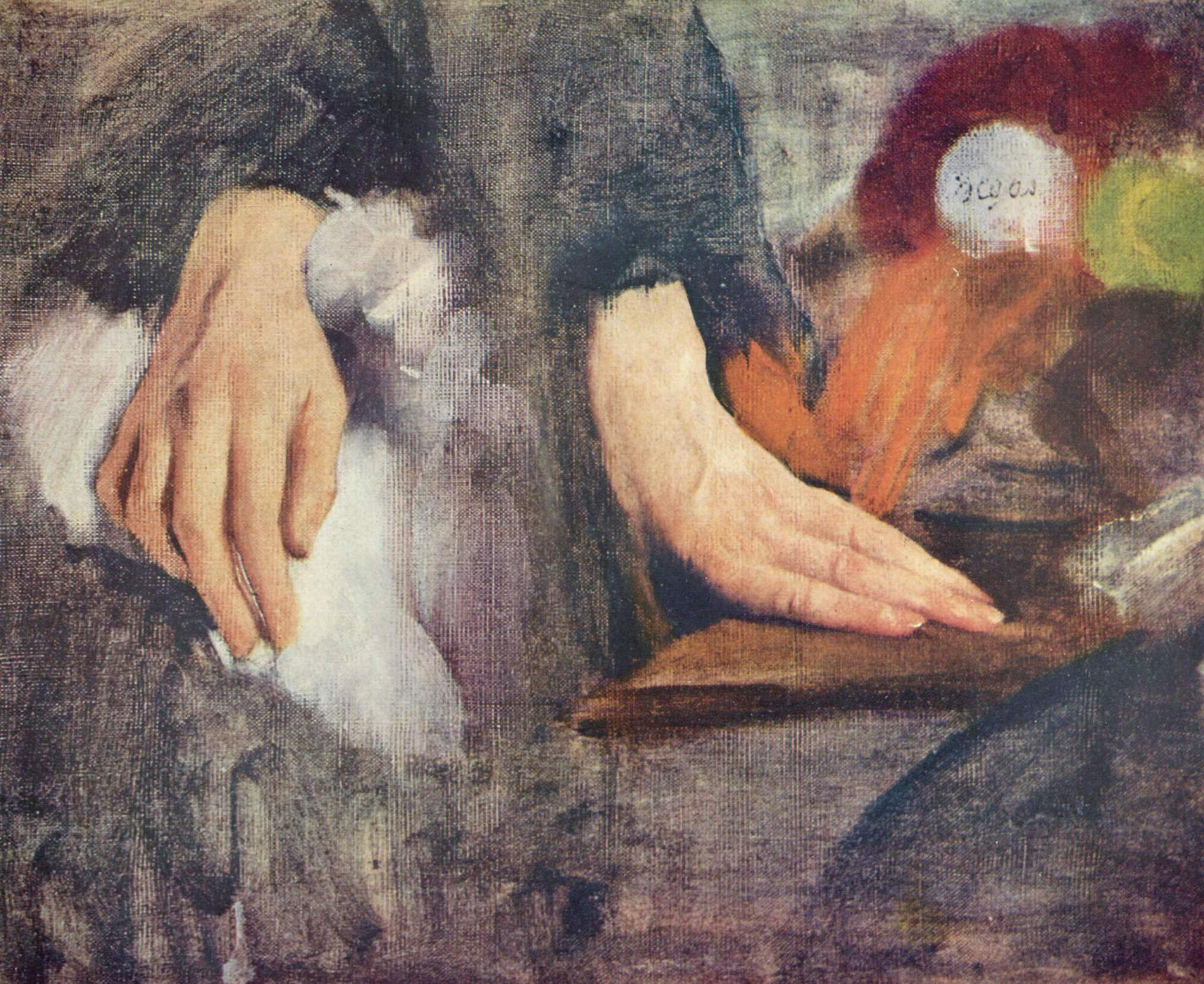
Study of Hands, an oil sketch of Laura Bellelli's hands. Musée d'Orsay. For Jean Sutherland Boggs, "the hands of the Bellellis play like the hands of mimes to give an indication of the relative composure of each family member."

In late March 1859, Degas left Florence to return to Paris. Other than the conclusion that Degas worked on the picture "for several years", there is no documentation to confirm the actual time or place at which the picture was painted; a likely scenario is that Degas brought to France numerous sketches and studies and painted the picture in a studio procured for this purpose in Paris. Supporting this conclusion is the observation that the Bellelli's apartment was too small to host such a large work, and there were no studio facilities. In March 1860, Degas returned to Italy, in part to conduct family business, and in April he again visited the Bellellis and made several drawings of his uncle; at some point he also executed a pastel which, but for some differences in details and a greater elaboration of the interior in the final painting, is close to the ultimate composition.

There is a family account, once accepted but more recently deemed unlikely, that offers a different version: a Neapolitan lawyer who married one of Degas' grandnieces claimed that the painting was completed in Italy, and brought back to France only some forty to fifty years later, but this is contradicted by evidence that the painting was exhibited in the Paris Salon of 1867.

== Composition and content ==
The work of many artists provided inspiration: at this time Degas included in his correspondence mention of Anthony van Dyck, Giorgione, and Botticelli, among others. Other prototypes whose influence have been cited, particularly in terms of composition, include 17th-century Dutch genre and portrait painting, the portrait studies of Ingres, Velázquez's Las Meninas, the portraits of Hans Holbein, the Family of Charles IV by Francisco Goya, Gustave Courbet's After Dinner at Ornans, and a lithograph by Honoré Daumier entitled A Man of Property. As in Las Meninas, a picture, mirror, and doorway are used to expand the space of the interior. Any and all historical models were synthesized into a composition that was "unique in the painter's oeuvre and unique among the works of his contemporaries." Taking Degas' family and their living environment as its subject, the painting represented Degas' first attempt "to characterize a room in relation to the personalities and interests of the individuals who inhabit it."

Las Meninas. Diego Velázquez, 1656. Oil on canvas. Las Meninas may have inspired Degas to extend the space of the apartment by employing some of the same elements: here, too, a picture, a doorway, and a reflected image are prominent.

Viewed alongside the work of Degas' contemporaries, the painting's uniqueness was due in large part to the composition, which presents a family portrait painted on the grand scale of a historical drama, and whose content has been interpreted as psychologically penetrating, with the placement of the figures suggestive of the parents' alienation from one another, and of the divided loyalties of their children. Laura Bellelli stands as if for an official portrait, her expression indicative of her unhappiness, one hand resting protectively on Giovanna's shoulder, the other balancing her pregnant body; Giulia, in the center of the painting and seated in a small chair, displays youthful restlessness as she faces, arms akimbo, in the direction of her father, and is the compositional link between her estranged parents. Gennaro appears indifferent, turned toward but seated apart from his family, his face mostly in shadow. The commanding figure of Laura is placed against a flat wall and a crisp picture frame, while Gennaro's more recessive figure is framed by a mantelpiece, bric-a-brac, and a reflective mirror. The clarity of the former's surroundings and the ambiguity of the latter's have been interpreted as expressive of their emotional distance. Telling, also, is the physical distance between them, as well as the difference in their postures. Their opposition has been seen as a "breaking of the frame": "it is as if [Gennaro] were morosely watching his family as they pose for his painter nephew". The family dog glimpsed at the lower right corner is, according to Arthur Danto, sensibly "sneaking out of the picture before all hell breaks loose". One is reminded of Laura Bellelli's note to Degas after he had returned to Paris: "You must be very happy to be with your family again, instead of being in the presence of a sad face like mine and a disagreeable one like my husband's."

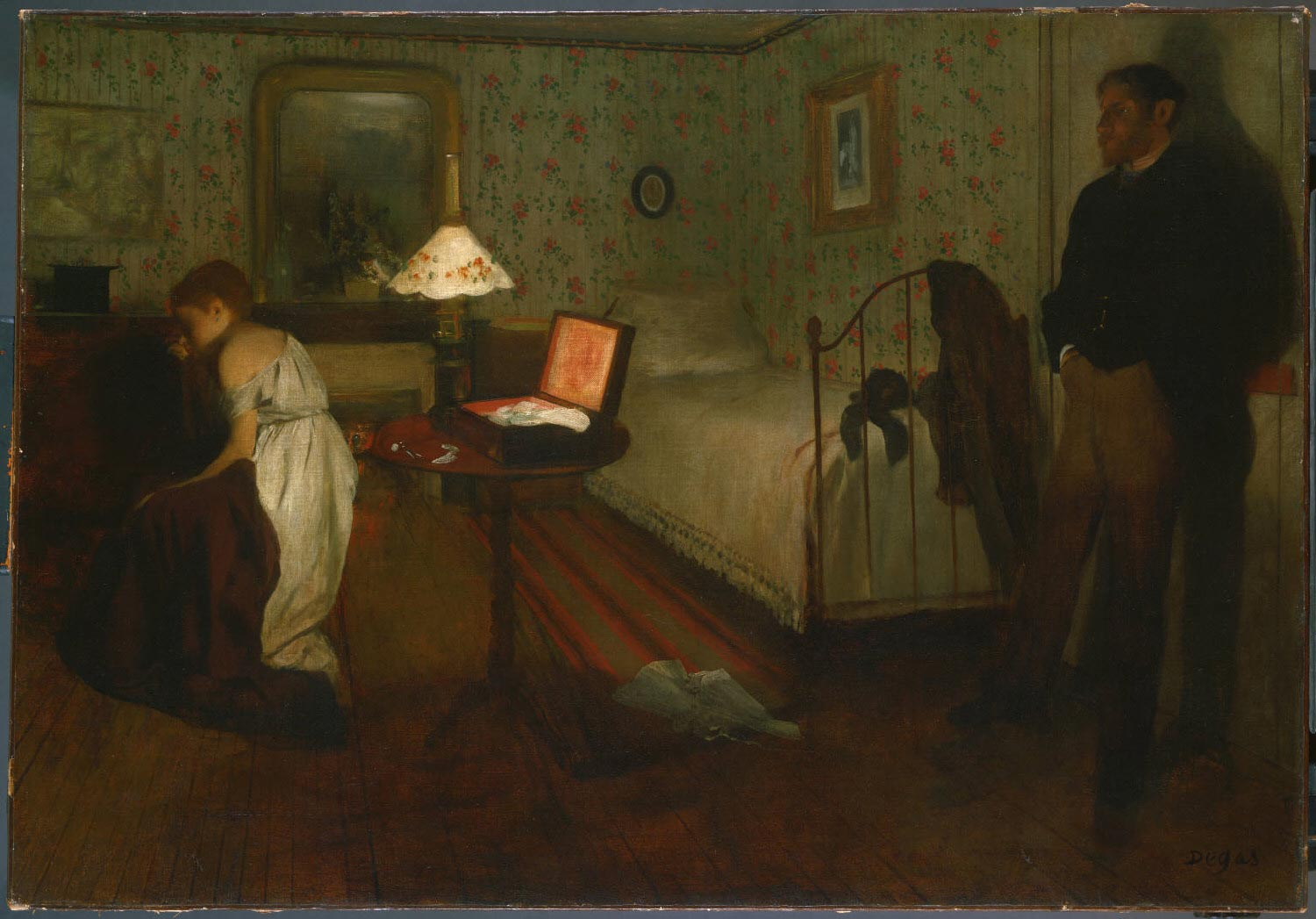
Interior Scene (The Rape), 1868-1869. As in The Bellelli Family, Degas used physical distance to express emotional disconnection between a male and female figure.

The drawing hung on the wall behind them is a portrait of the recently deceased Hilaire Degas, and was presumably a study for the portraits Degas made of his grandfather, drawn in the style of the Clouets. By placing it directly behind his aunt's head, Degas was connecting the generations of his family, and following a convention of portraiture used since the Renaissance, that of including ancestral effigies. By its very placement Degas was implicitly affirming his own presence and identifying with Laura, with whom, as their correspondence attests, he was unusually close.

The unease of The Bellelli Family was not an anomaly, nor were such tensions revealed solely through the study of portraiture; in fact, alienation between the sexes was a recurring condition in Degas' work of the 1860s. Sulking and Interior Scene (The Rape) are both works of ambiguous content set in contemporary Paris, and The Young Spartan Girls Provoking the Boys and The Misfortunes of the City of Orleans occur in the ancient and medieval eras, yet in each "the element of hostility between the sexes is apparent", and in the latter the hostility has turned deadly. The Bellelli Family is notable for introducing psychological conflict in a painting that documents his own family. Given his usual discretion, it is reasonable to assume that such expressions were the product of Degas' unconscious mind.

== Exhibition history and provenance ==
The painting was almost certainly conceived as an exhibition piece, for it is doubtful that Degas would have painted something so ambitious in scale for purely private satisfaction. In April 1859 Degas wrote his father asking him to look for a studio in Paris so that he could work on an unspecified project; probably The Bellelli Family was the work he had in mind, and it is believed that the painting was eventually exhibited in the Salon of 1867. Although reviews made no mention of the picture, that this is the painting which Degas exhibited under the title of Family Portrait is supported by several pieces of evidence: a critic who later visited Degas in his studio referred to "the admirable Family Portrait of 1867"; in 1881 the painter Jean-Jacques Henner discussed Degas' withdrawal from the Salons because his work was badly hung and ignored as a result, adding "The portrait of his brother-in-law (I believe) and his family is a great work"; and the fact that Degas requested permission at the last minute to retouch his submissions to the 1867 Salon, and that the hasty reworking would account for the picture's later crackling and blackish streaks.

The Bellelli Family remained with Degas until his last move in 1913, at which time he left it with his dealer, Paul Durand-Ruel. The painting was not seen again publicly until after Degas's death, when it was put up for sale in 1918 as part of the painter's estate. Its unexpected appearance created a sensation, and The Bellelli Family was immediately purchased by the Musée du Luxembourg for 400,000 francs.

In 1947 the painting was exhibited in the Musée d'Impressionisme (Jeu-de-Paumes), and subsequently moved to the Musée d'Orsay.

== Condition ==
At the time of its sale in 1918, the painting was in poor condition. In addition to the black streaks and crackling, it had tears and was dust-covered, and may have been kept by Degas for many years rolled-up in the corner of his successive studios. At some point, possibly in the 1890s, Degas restored the painting, sewing up tears, applying gesso to them, repainting Laura Bellelli's face, and retouching those of his uncle and cousins. However, prior to the painting's sale a restorer apparently misinterpreted these repairs and scraped them off, re-injuring the portraits of Gennaro and Giulia. The painting was subsequently restored in the 1980s.

== Assessment ==
When exhibited at the sale of Degas' atelier in 1918, the picture elicited some confusion from critics; one called it "as dull as a Flemish interior, although the dry technique is distinctive." Most of the reviews were positive, and with the country at war, The Bellelli Family was seen as possessing a distinctly French character, a "modern primitive" that bore comparison to the Avignon Pieta. Since then, biographers of Degas have acknowledged it as the masterpiece of his youth.

== Sources ==
- Baumann, Felix; Karabelnik, Marianne, et al. Degas Portraits. London: Merrell Holberton, 1994. ISBN 1-85894-014-1
- Boggs, Jean Sutherland; et al. Degas. The Metropolitan Museum of Art, New York, 1988. ISBN 0-87099-519-7
- Danto, Arthur (December 12, 1988). "Degas". The Nation: 658.
- Kagan, Donald Western Heritage 7th Edition" (Pg. 829), 2001.
- Reff, Theodore. Degas: The Artist's Mind. The Metropolitan Museum of Art, Harper & Row, 1976. ISBN 0-87099-146-9
- Sutton, Denys. Edgar Degas: Life and Work. Rizzoli, New York, 1986. ISBN 0-8478-0733-9
