= Belleli =

Belleli is a surname. Notable people with the surname include:

- Avi Belleli (born 1963), Israeli singer and musician
- Hasmig Belleli, Canadian politician
- Lajos Belleli (born 1977), Hungarian male curler and curling coach

== See also ==
- Bellelli
