= The Church of Marissel =

Painting by Jean-Baptiste-Camille Corot

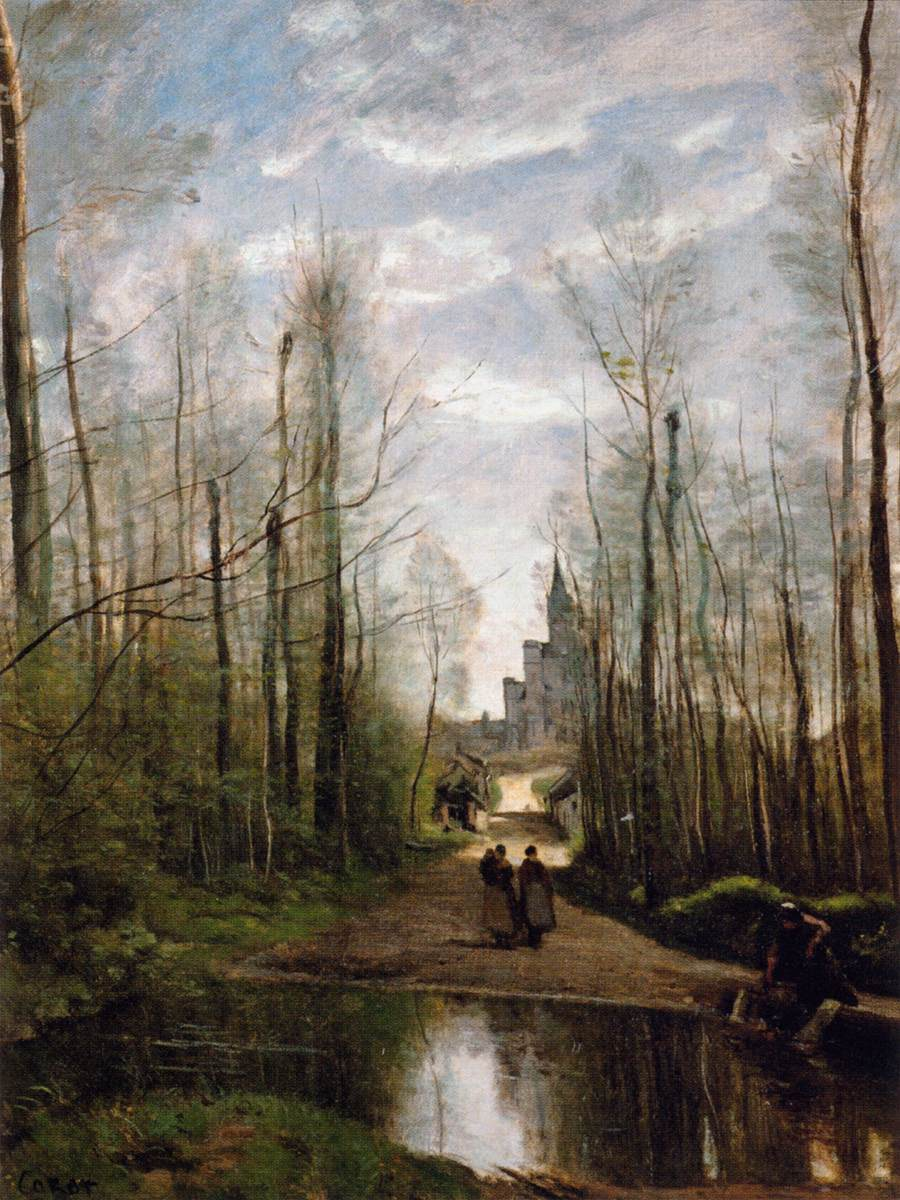
- Artist: Jean-Baptiste-Camille Corot
- Year: 1866
- Type: Oil on canvas, landscape painting
- Dimensions: 55 cm × 42 cm (22 in × 17 in)
- Location: Louvre, Paris

The Church of Marissel (French: L'église de Marissel, près de Beauvais) is an 1866 landscape painting by the French artist Jean-Baptiste-Camille Corot. It features a view of village of Marissel near Beauvais in the department of Oise. He had previously produced an 1857 landscape there The Willows of Marissel. The painting was displayed at the Salon of 1867 held at the Palace of Industry in Paris. Today it is part of the collection of the Louvre, having been acquired in 1906.

== Bibliography ==
- Selz, Jean. La vie et l'œuvre de Camille Corot. ACR, 1988.
- Tinterow, Gary, Pantazzi, Michael & Pomarède, Vincent. Corot. Metropolitan Museum of Art, 1996
