= General Bazaine Attacks Fort San Xavier During the Siege of Puebla =

Painting by Jean-Adolphe Beaucé

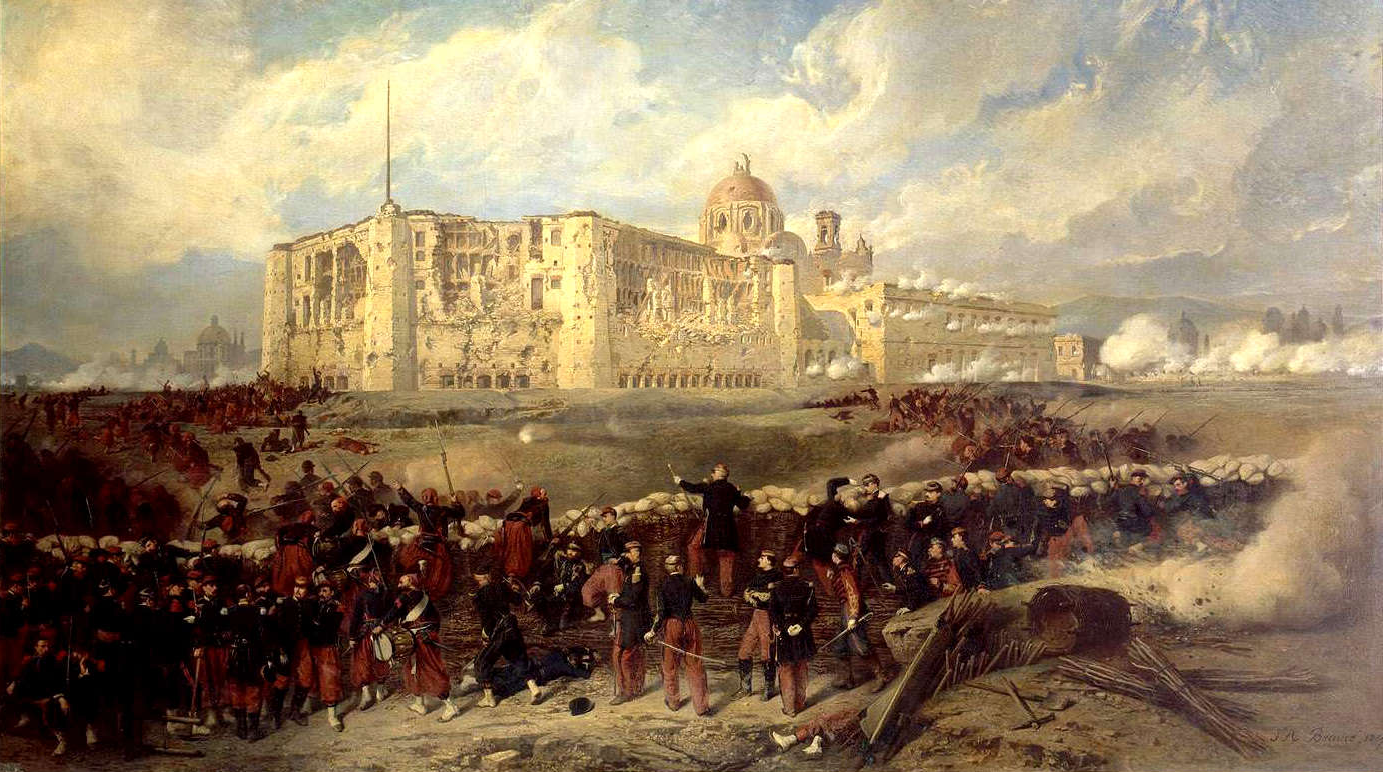
- Artist: Jean-Adolphe Beaucé
- Year: 1867
- Type: Oil on canvas, history painting
- Dimensions: 215 cm × 375 cm (85 in × 148 in)
- Location: Palace of Versailles, Versailles

General Bazaine Attacks Fort San Xavier During the Siege of Puebla (French: Le Général Bazaine attaque le fort de San-Xavier lors du siège de Puebla) is an oil on canvas history painting by the French artist Jean-Adolphe Beaucé, from 1867.

== History and description ==
It depicts a scene from the French Intervention in Mexico. On 29 March 1863 during the Siege of Puebla French troops commanded by François Achille Bazaine stormed Fort San Xavier. The seizure of Puebla opened the way to Mexico City. Next to Bazaine, General Clément Vernhet de Laumière is shown mortally wounded.

Continuing the policy of earlier regimes, the Second Empire of Napoleon III commissioned many large-scale works depicting French military successes. The painting was exhibited at the Salon of 1867 at the Palace of Industry in Paris which opened on 1 May 1867. On 19 June, the French-backed Austrian-born Emperor of Maximilian was executed by a firing squad. The picture is today in the collection of the Museum of French History at the Palace of Versailles.

== Bibliography ==
- Elderfield, John. Manet and the Execution of Maximilian. Museum of Modern Art, 2006.
- Thoma, Julia. The Final Spectacle: Military Painting under the Second Empire, 1855-1867. Walter de Gruyter, 2019.
