= Salon of 1867 =

1867 art exhibition in Paris

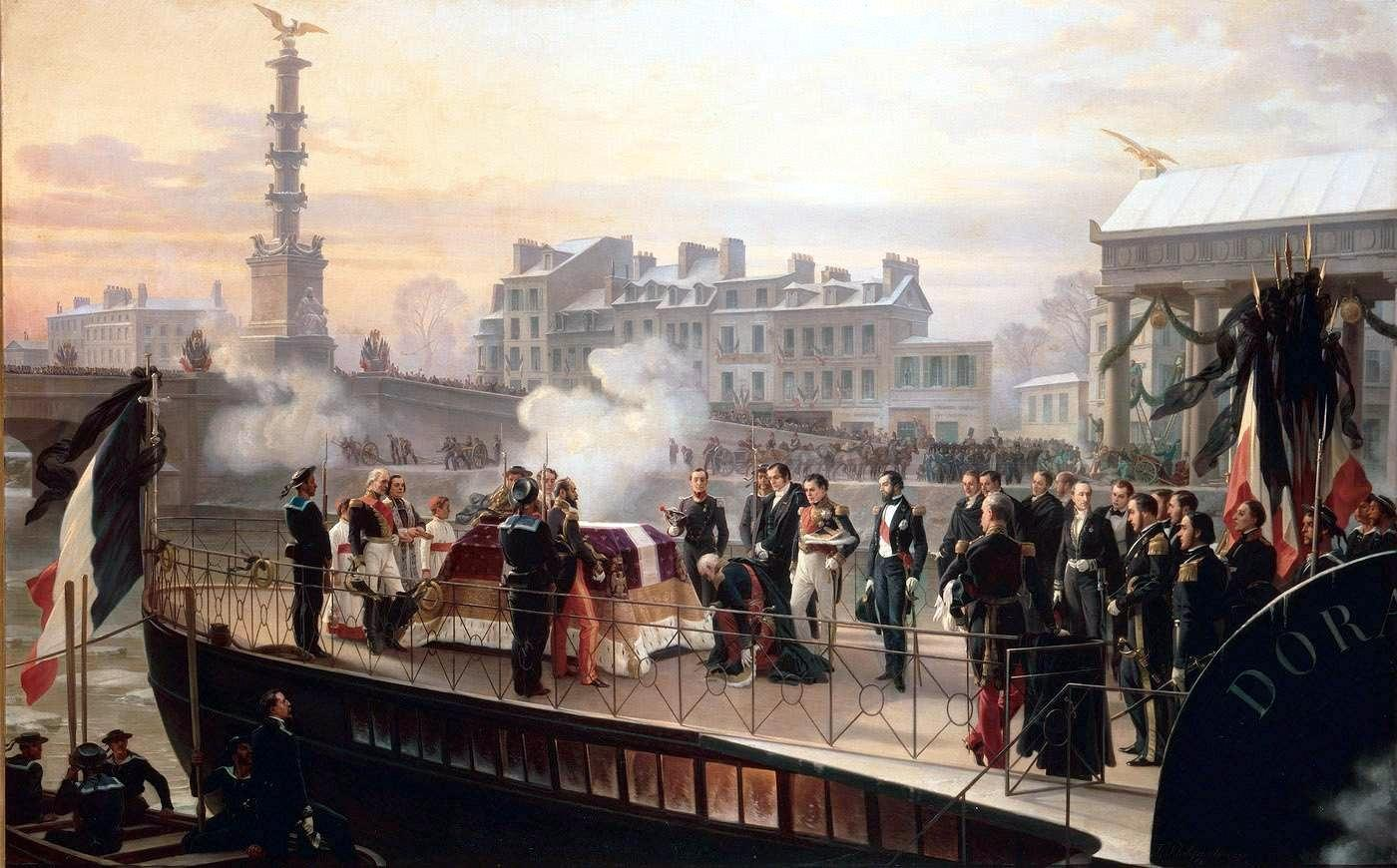
The Arrival of La Dorade at Courbevoie by Henri Félix Emmanuel Philippoteaux

The Salon of 1867 was an art exhibition held at the Palace of Industry in Paris from 15 April to 5 June 1867. It was held during the Second Empire of Napoleon III.

The event took place the same year as the large Exposition Universelle of 1867. In contrast to the previous Exposition Universelle, when the Salon of 1855 was incorporated into the general exhibition, the authorities decided to split the art between two different events. While the 1867 Exposition would act as a retrospective of artworks, particularly those from the past twelve years, the Salon would feature the newer artworks. While the Salon ran for six weeks, the Exposition would last for six months. A number of artists petitioned the government to extend the length of the Salon but were only able to gain an extra weeks beyond the planned closing date of 31 May.

The selection committee for the Salon was particularly severe in rejecting submissions. Amongst those who were refused were the emerging Impressionists Camille Pissarro, Paul Cézanne, Frédéric Bazille, Pierre-Auguste Renoir, Alfred Sisley and Claude Monet. Generally traditional Academic Art was favoured, although the American-born James McNeill Whistler did exhibit his At the Piano, which had previously been rejected at the Salon of 1859. Just as he had in 1855 the leading Realist painter Gustave Courbet chose to stage his own one-man exhibition, separate from the major events. While this was not formally endorsed by the authorities Courbet was now treated effectively as an Old Master. The younger Édouard Manet, despite craving the approval of the official Salon, set up his own pavilion adjacent to Courbet's to display more than fifty of his own paintings.

The state continued its policy of displaying works commissioned for the Palace of Versailles. These included Jean-Adolphe Beaucé's depictions of the Second Intervention in Mexico. His General Bazaine Attacks Fort San Xavier During the Siege of Puebla showed a major French victory of the campaign while his Portrait of Marshal Bazaine depicted the successful commander.

== Gallery ==
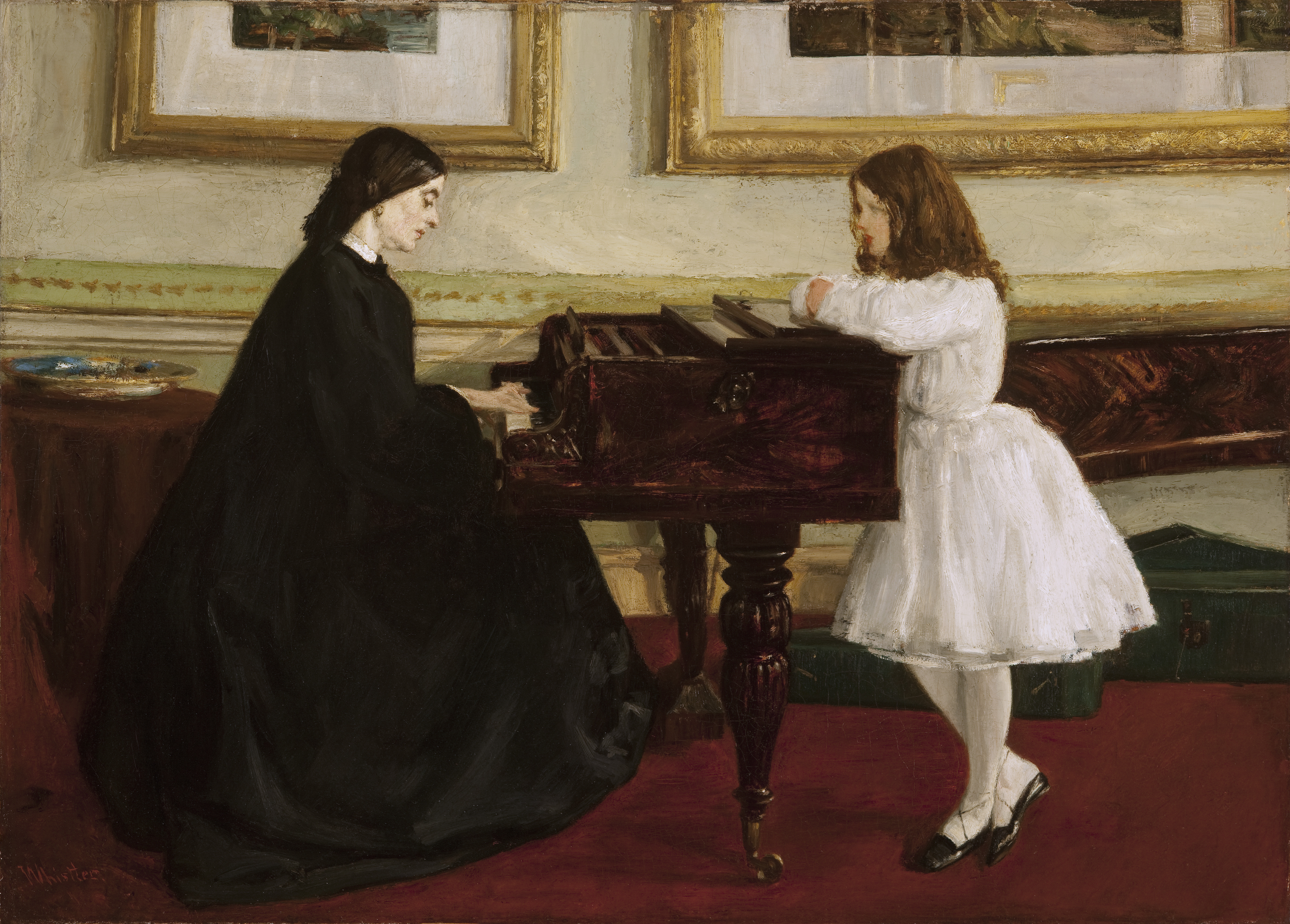
At the Piano by James McNeill Whistler

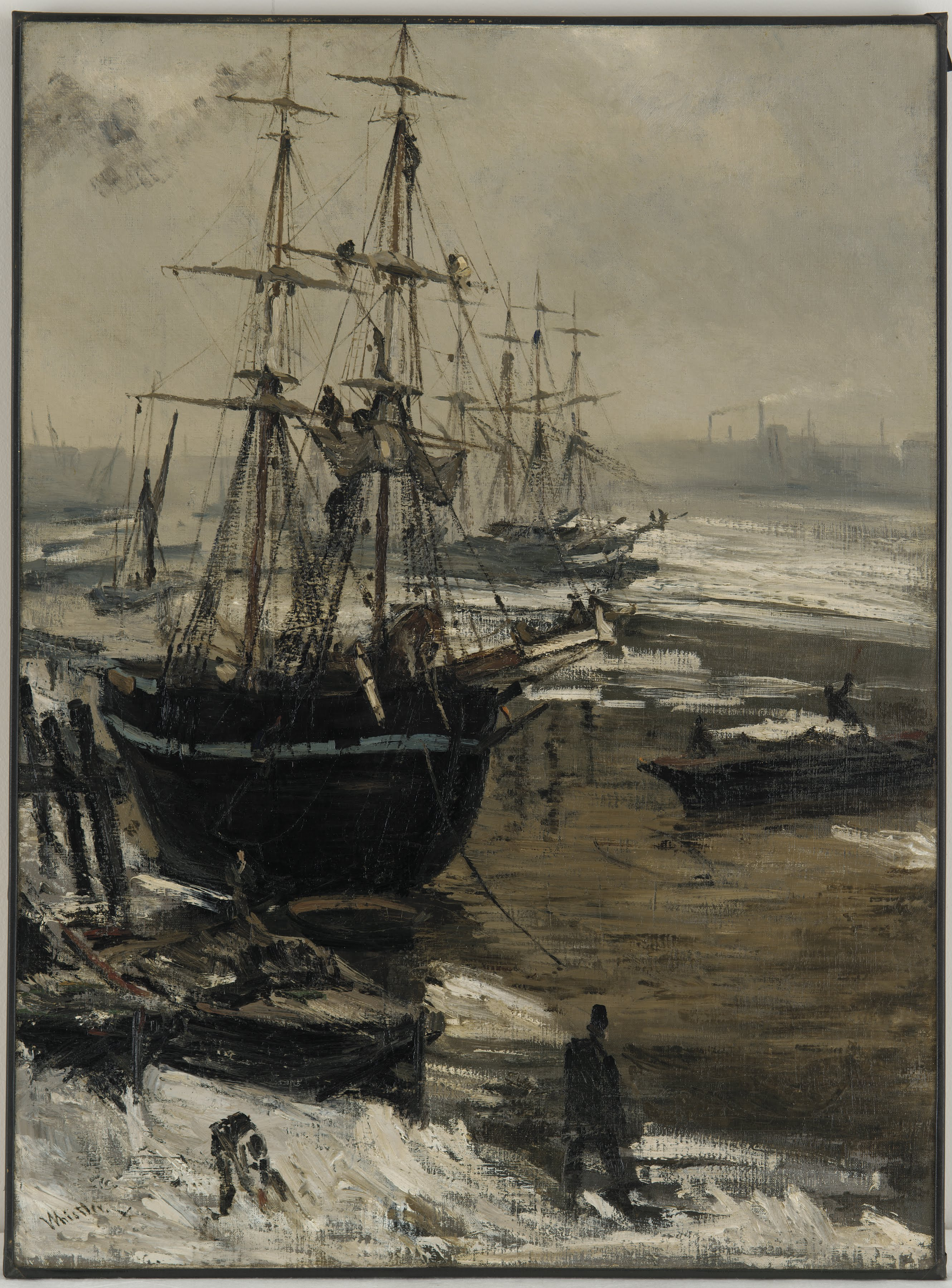
The Thames in Ice by James McNeill Whistler

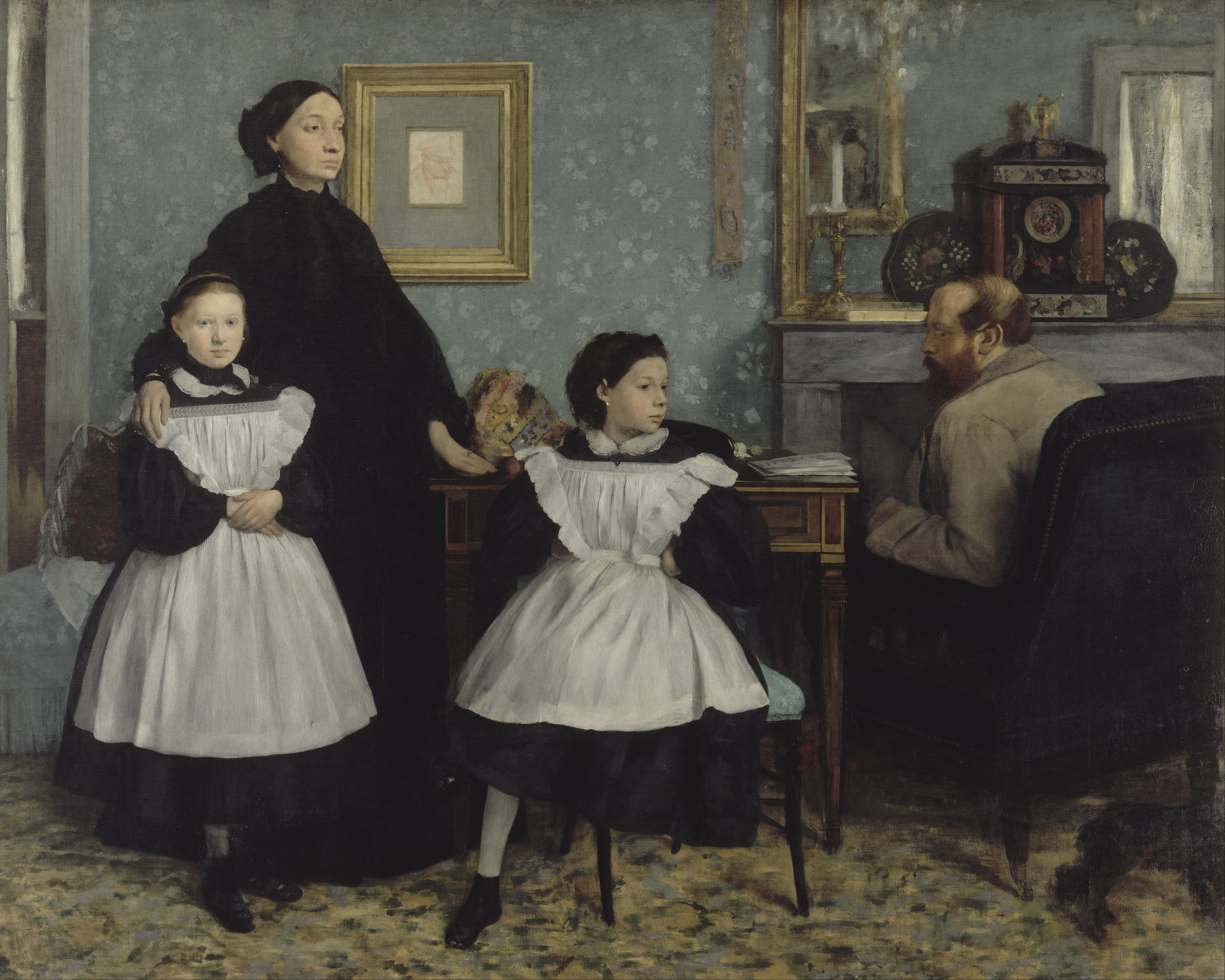
The Bellelli Family by Edgar Degas

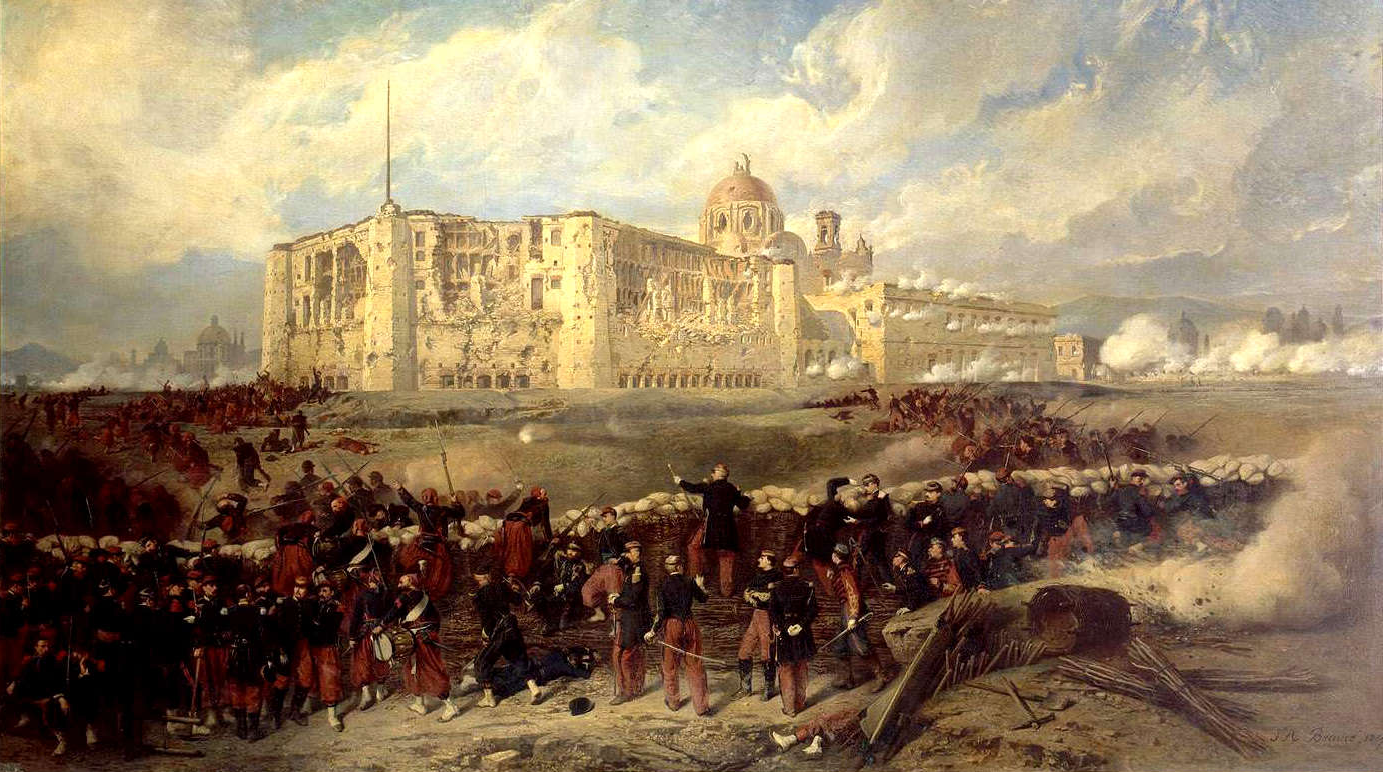
General Bazaine Attacks Fort San Xavier During the Siege of Puebla by Jean-Adolphe Beaucé

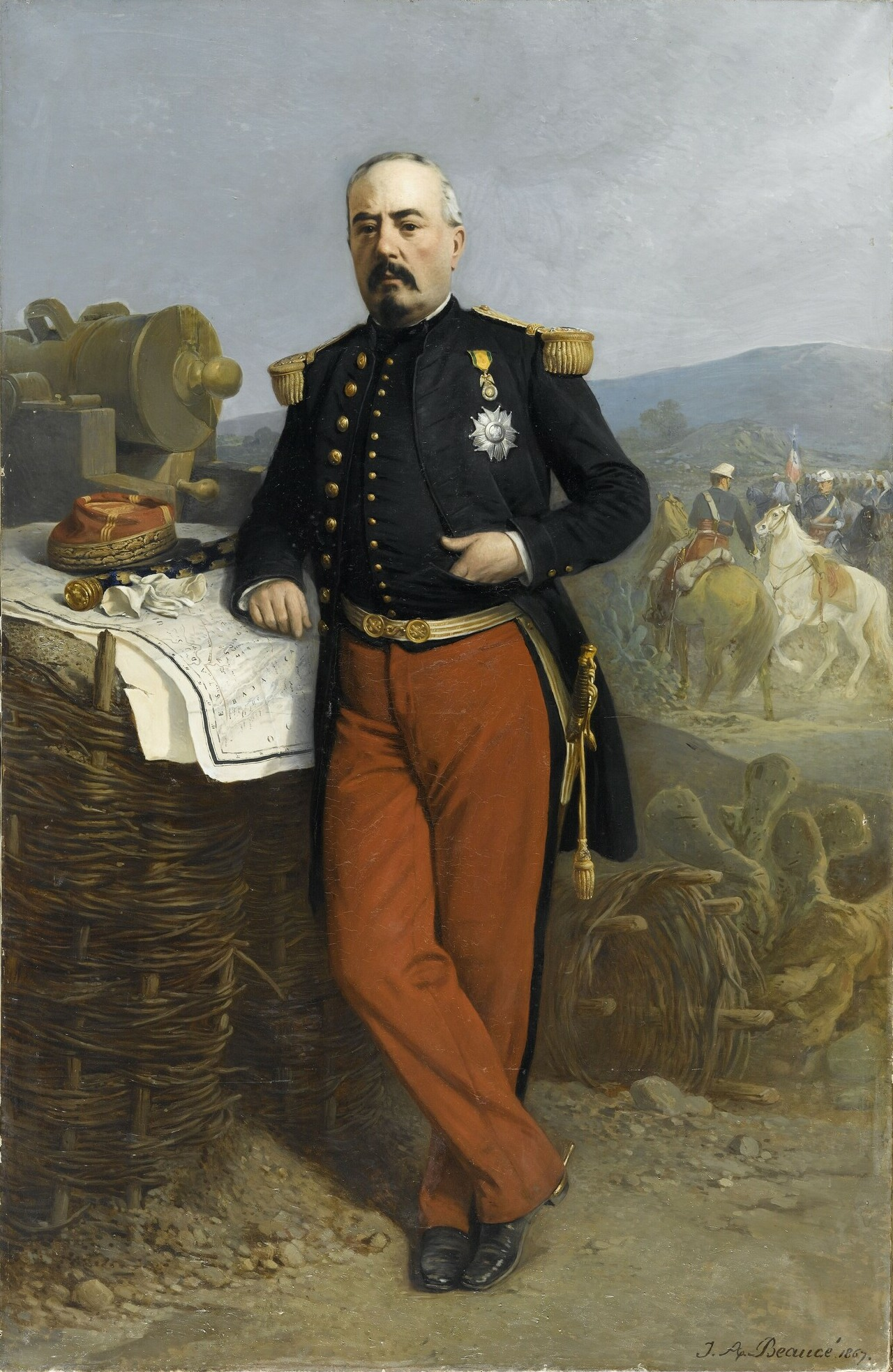
Portrait of Marshal Bazaine by Jean-Adolphe Beaucé

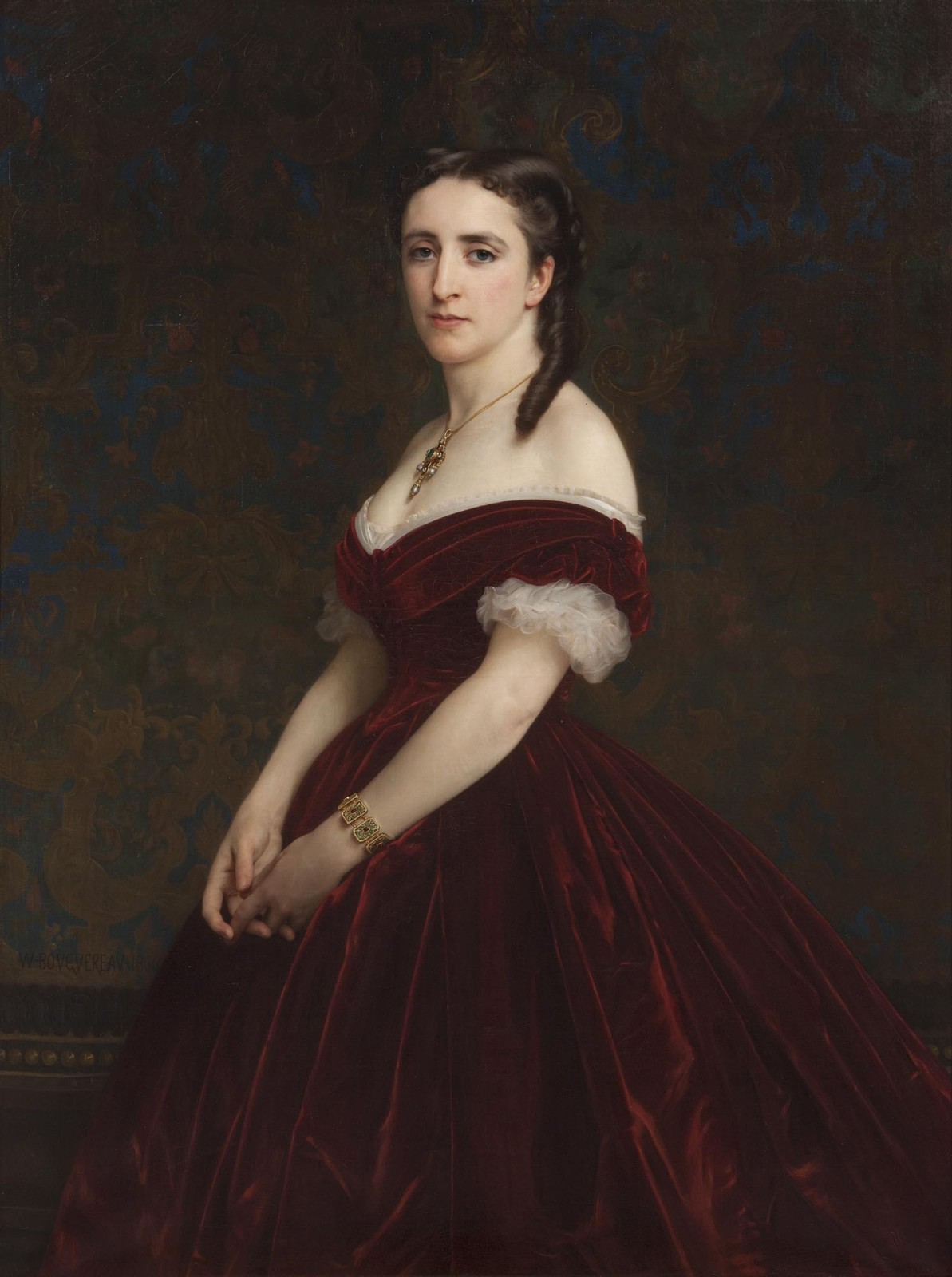
Portrait of the Vicomtesse de Chabrol by William-Adolphe Bouguereau

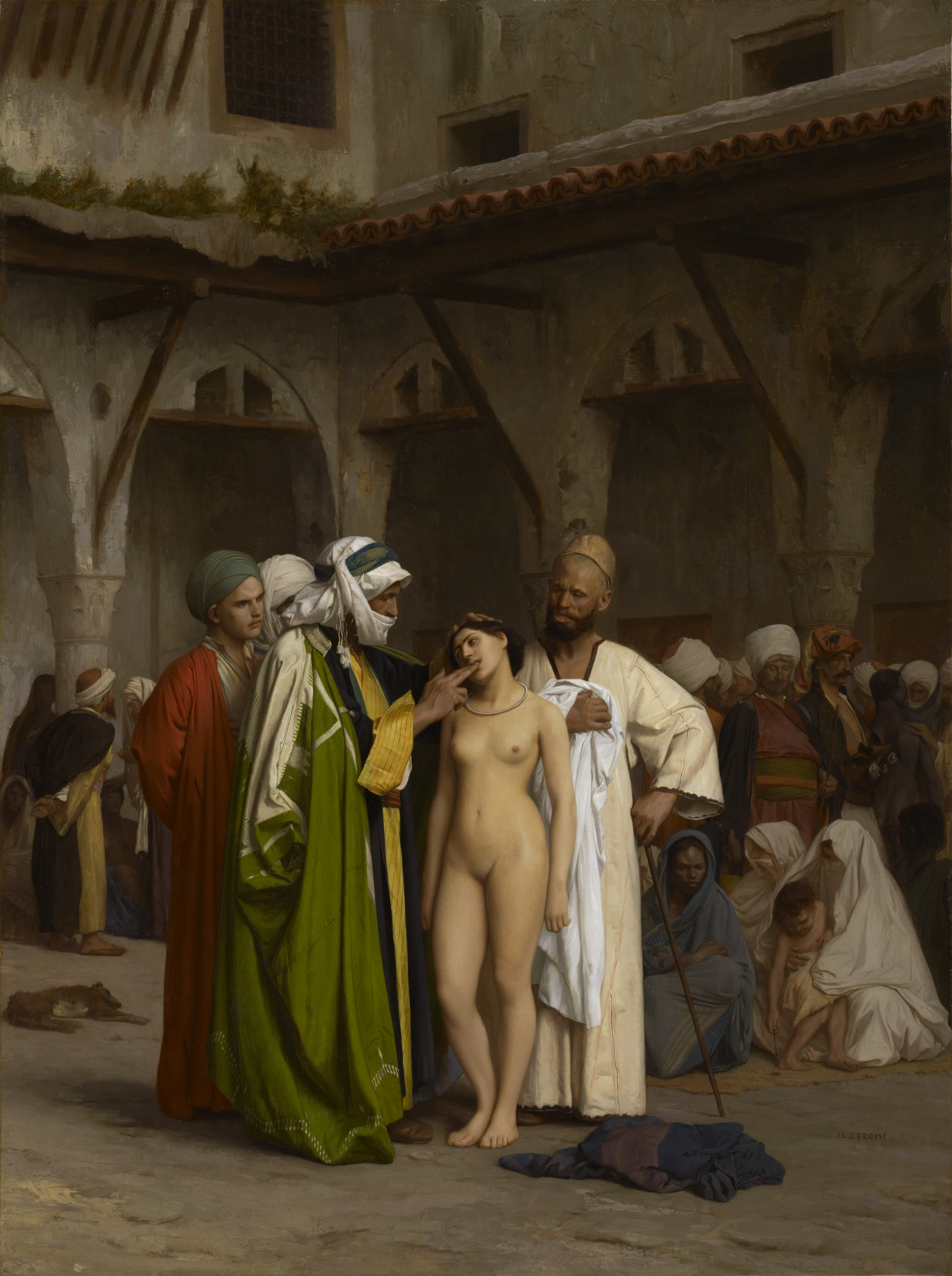
The Slave Market by Jean-Léon Gérôme

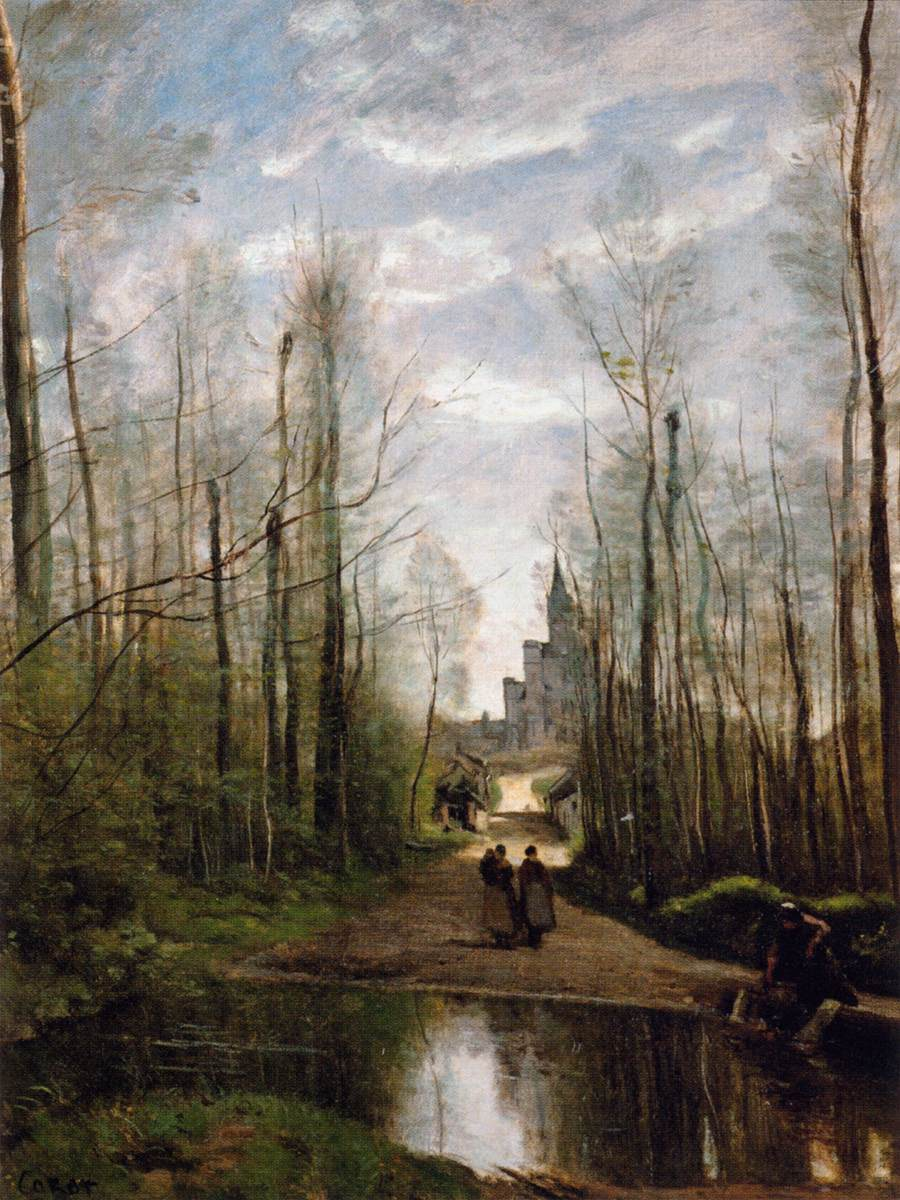
The Church of Marissel by Jean-Baptiste-Camille Corot

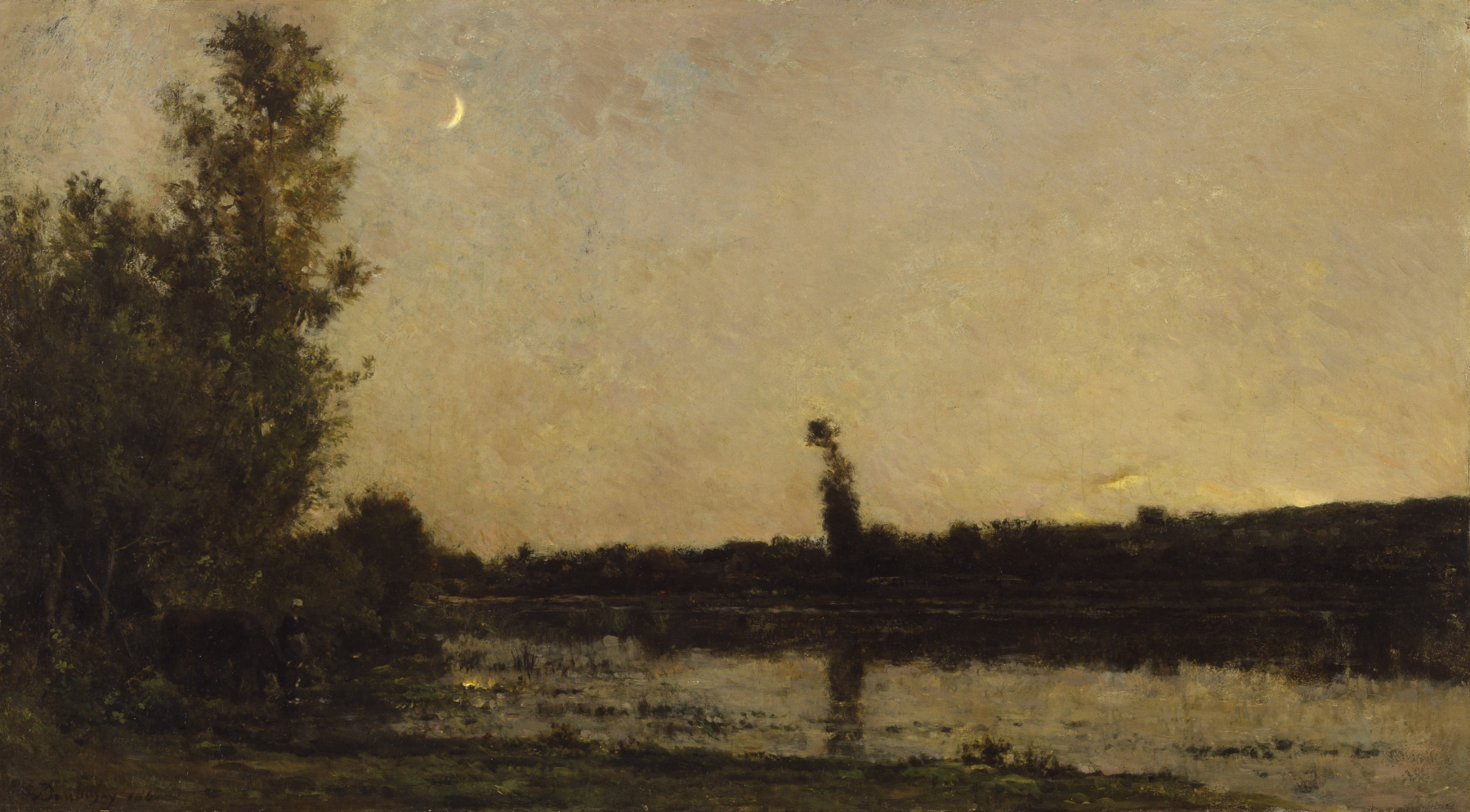
Twilight by Charles François Daubigny

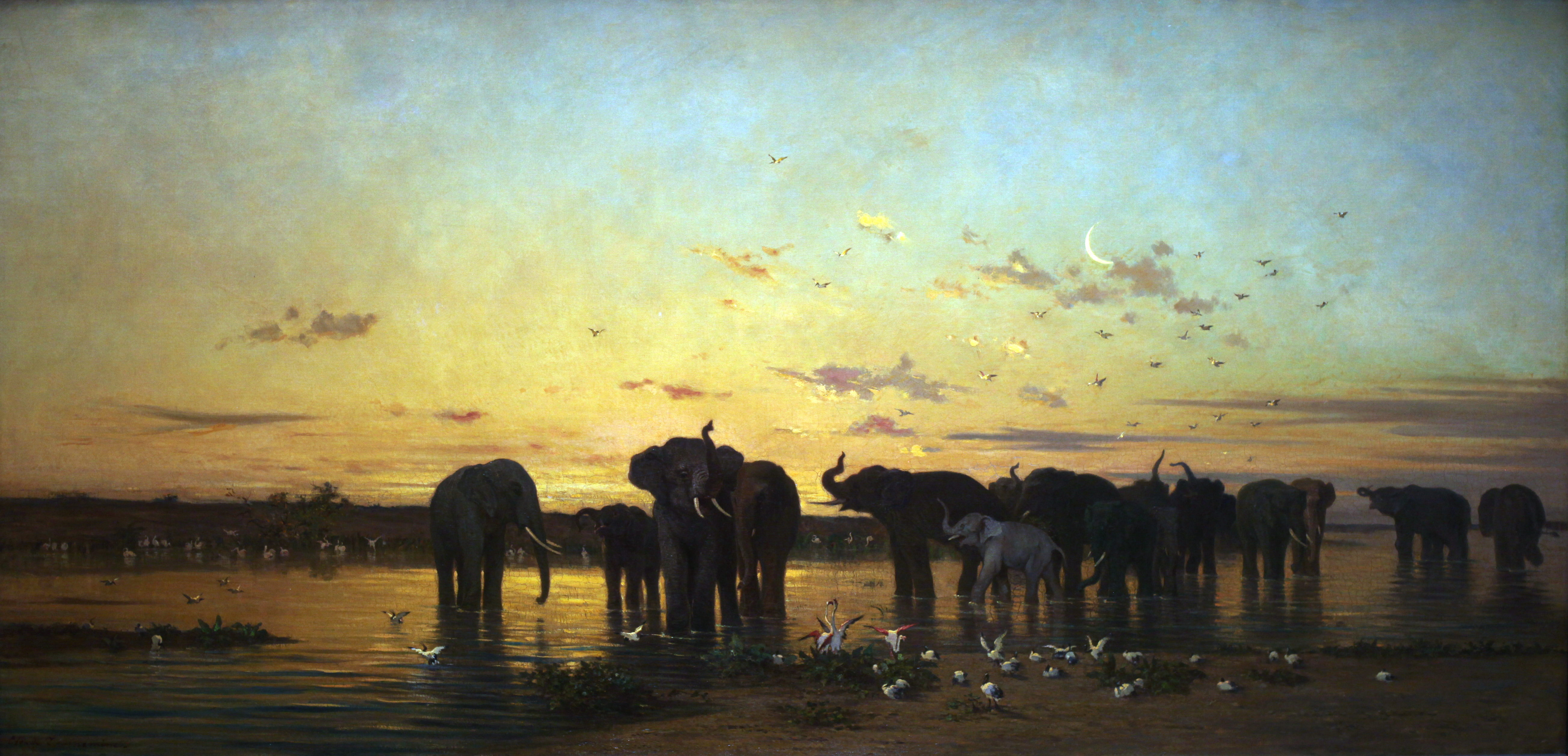
African elephants by Charles-Émile de Tournemine

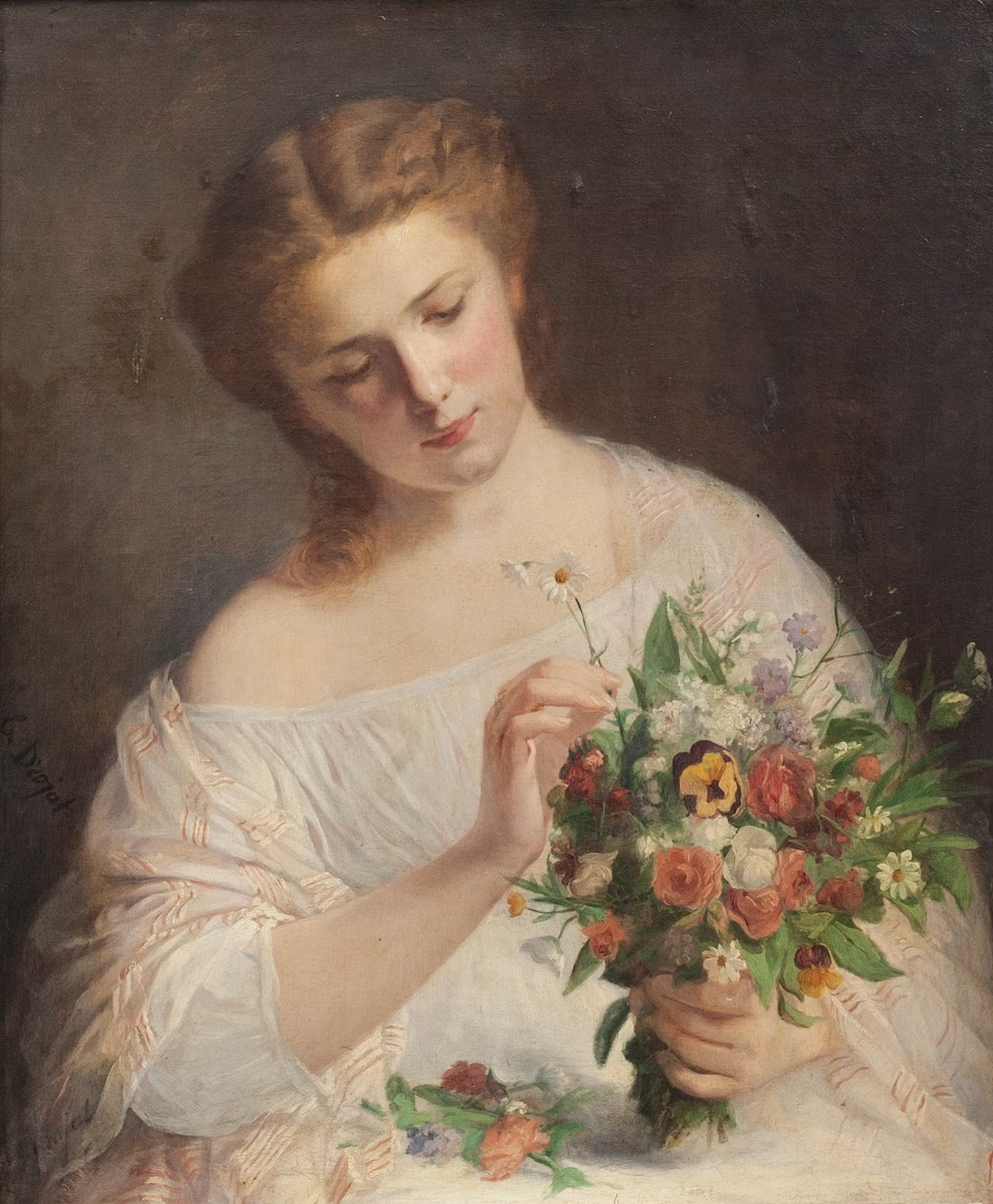
Woman with Bouquet of Flowers by Élisa Drojat

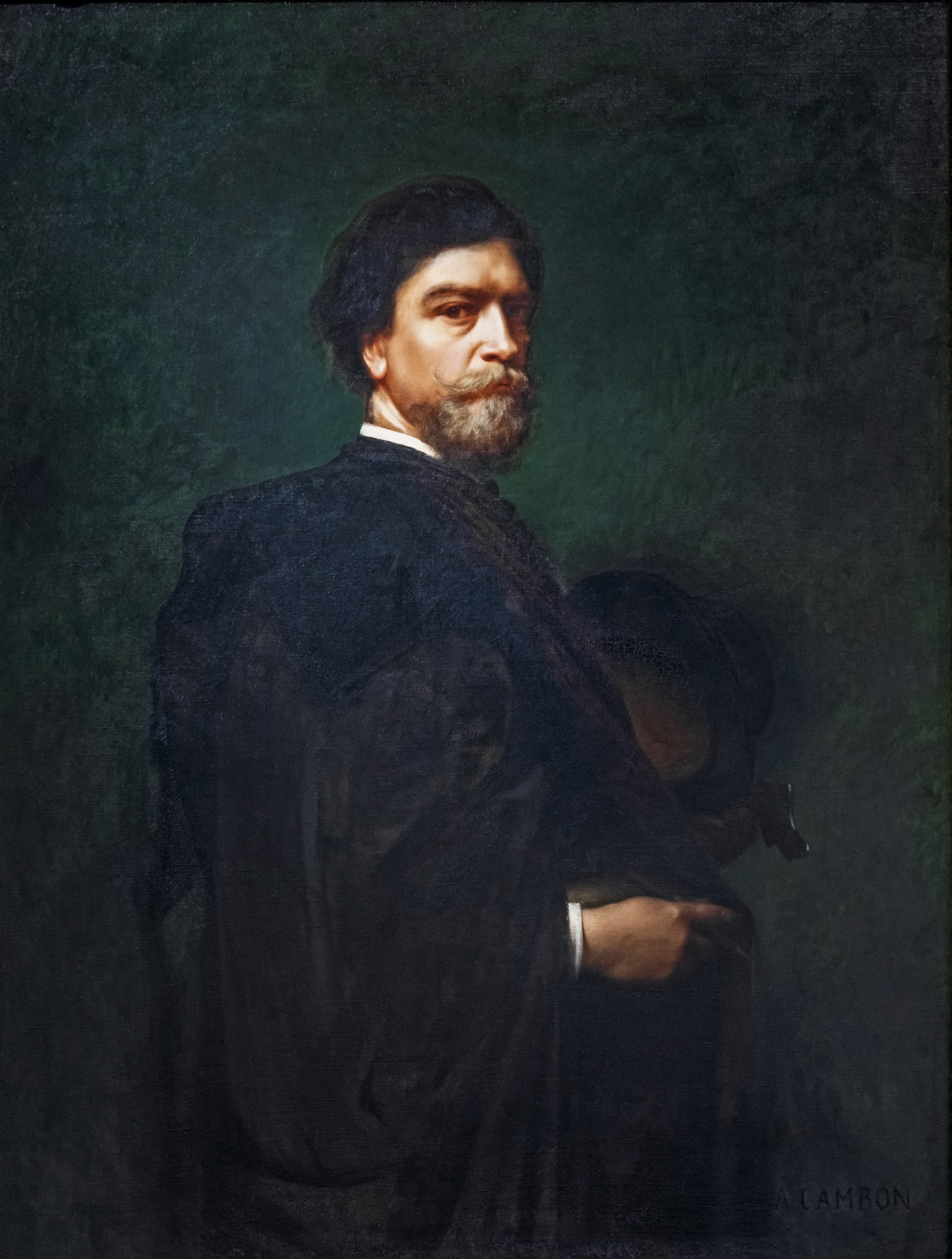
Self-Portrait by Armand Cambon

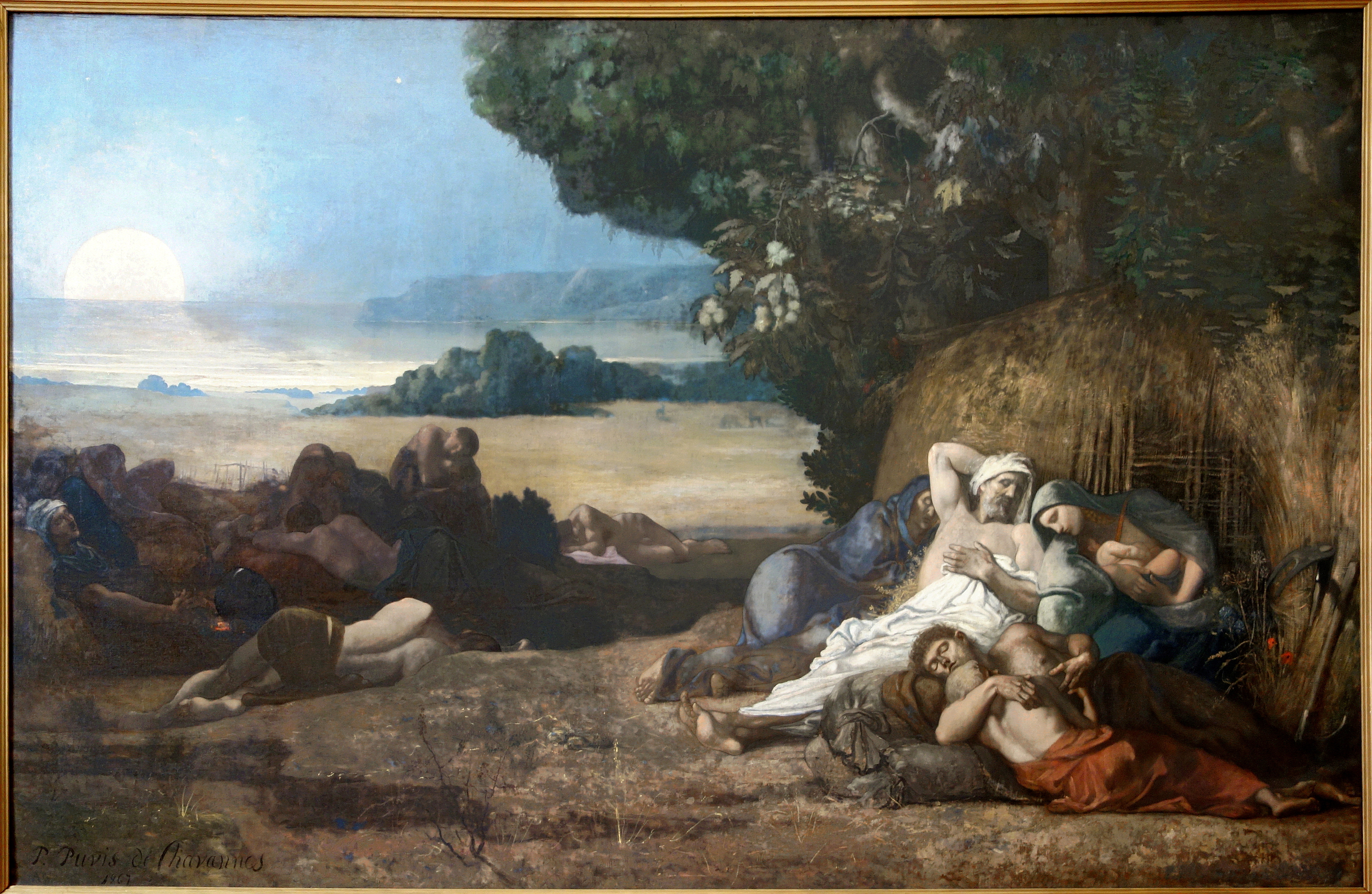
The Sleep by Pierre Puvis de Chavannes

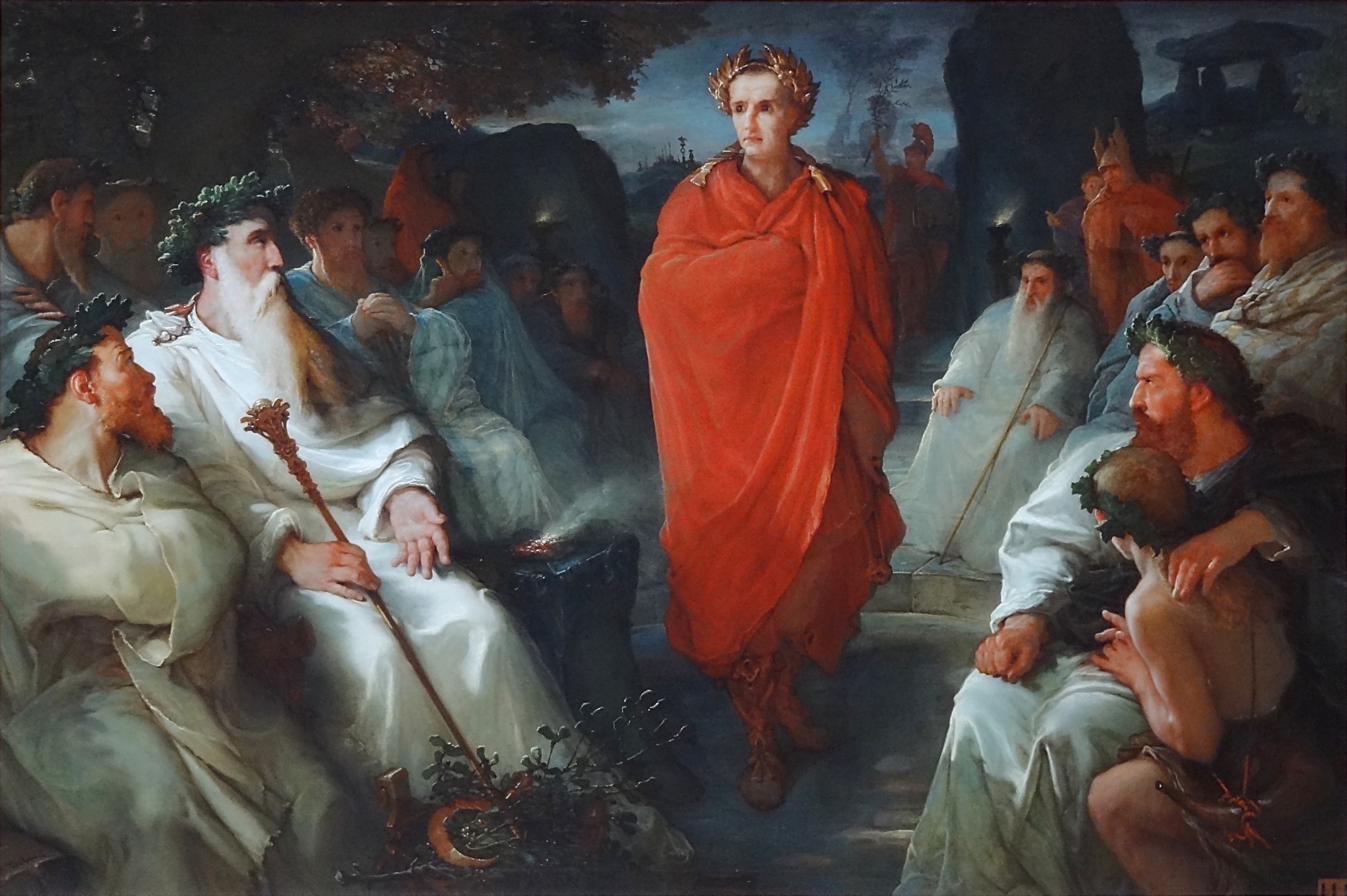
Caesar Arrives to Negotiate with the Druids by François Debon

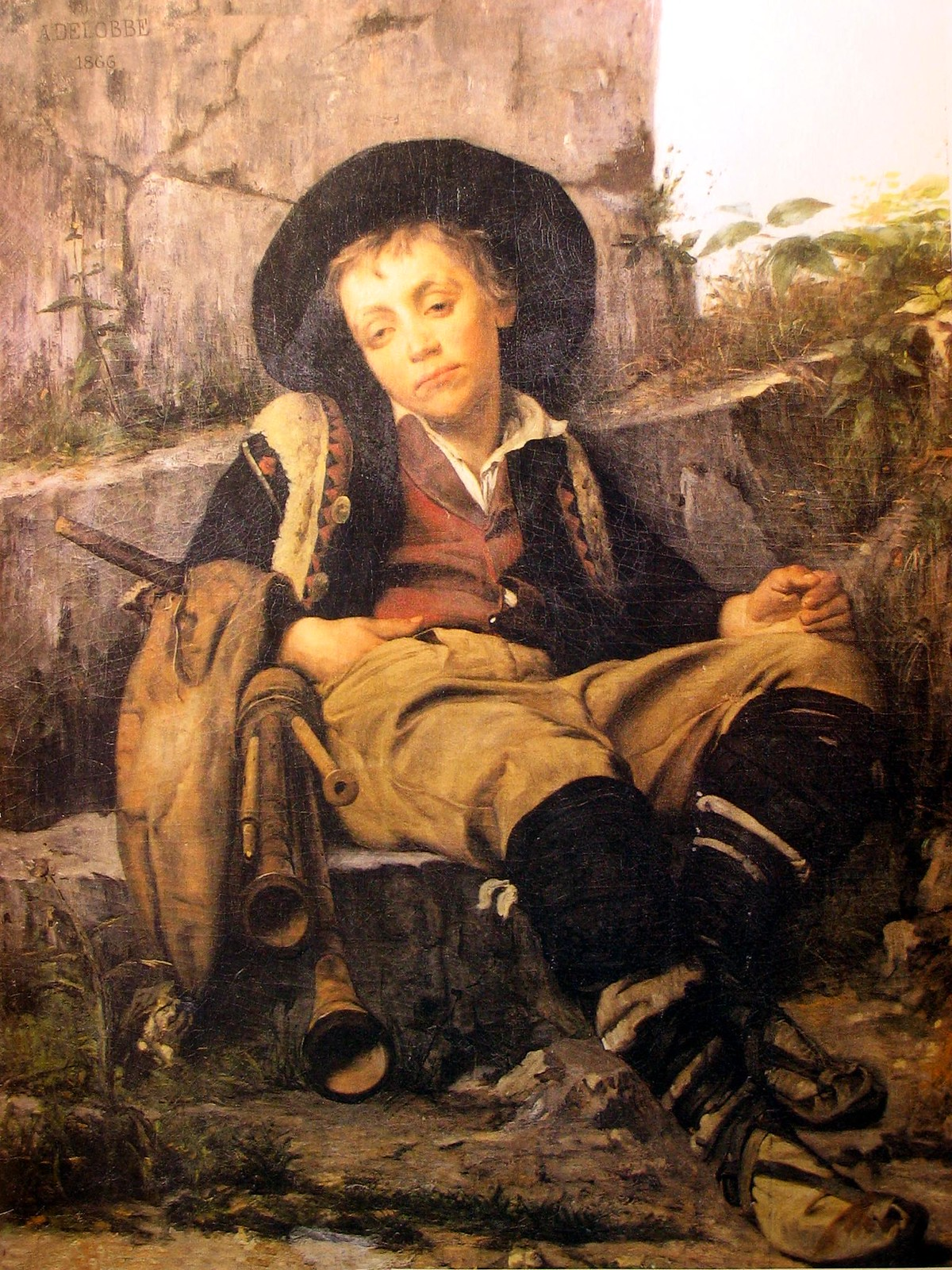
Young Shepherd in the Roman Countryside by François-Alfred Delobbe

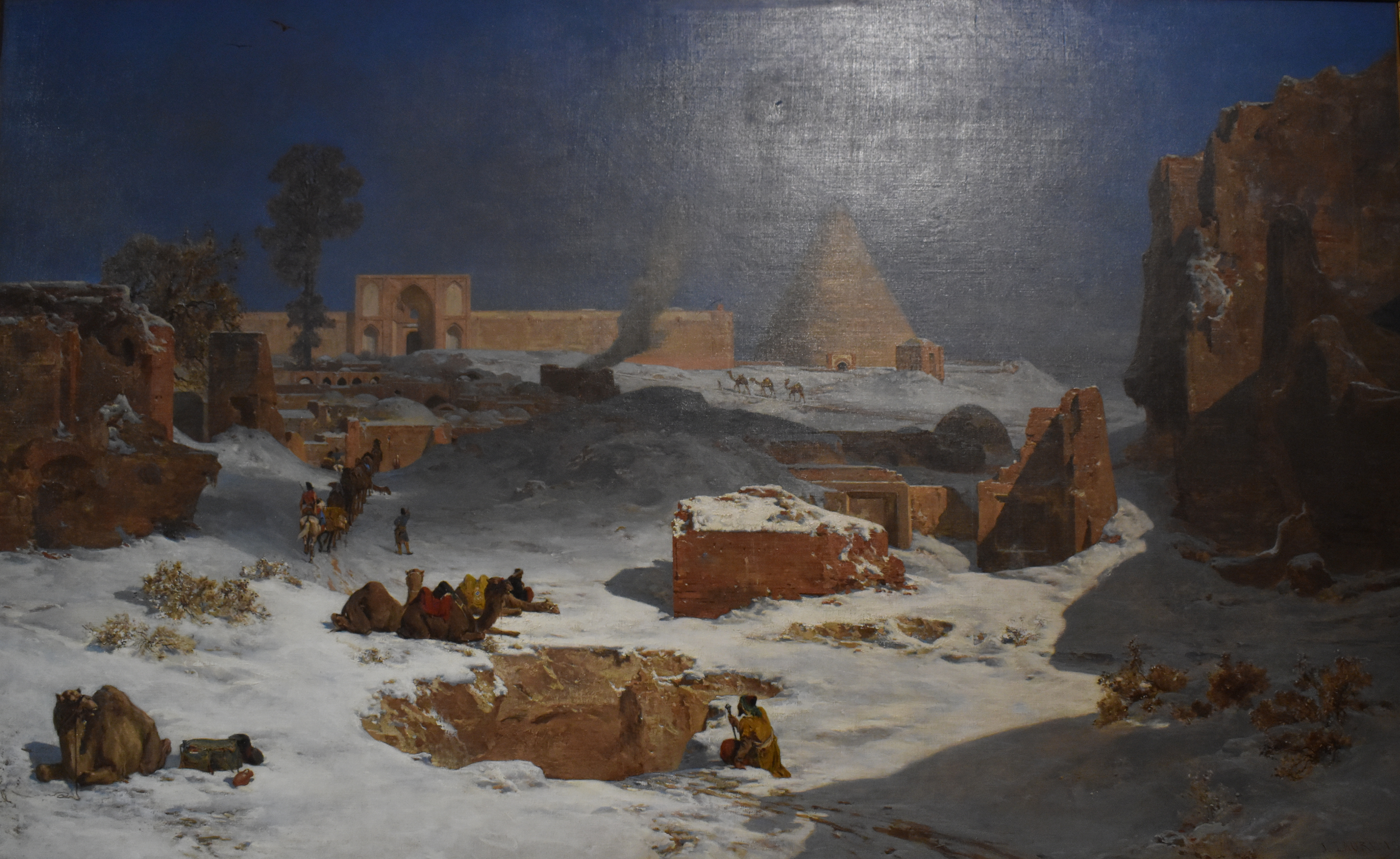
Winter in Persia by Jules Laurens

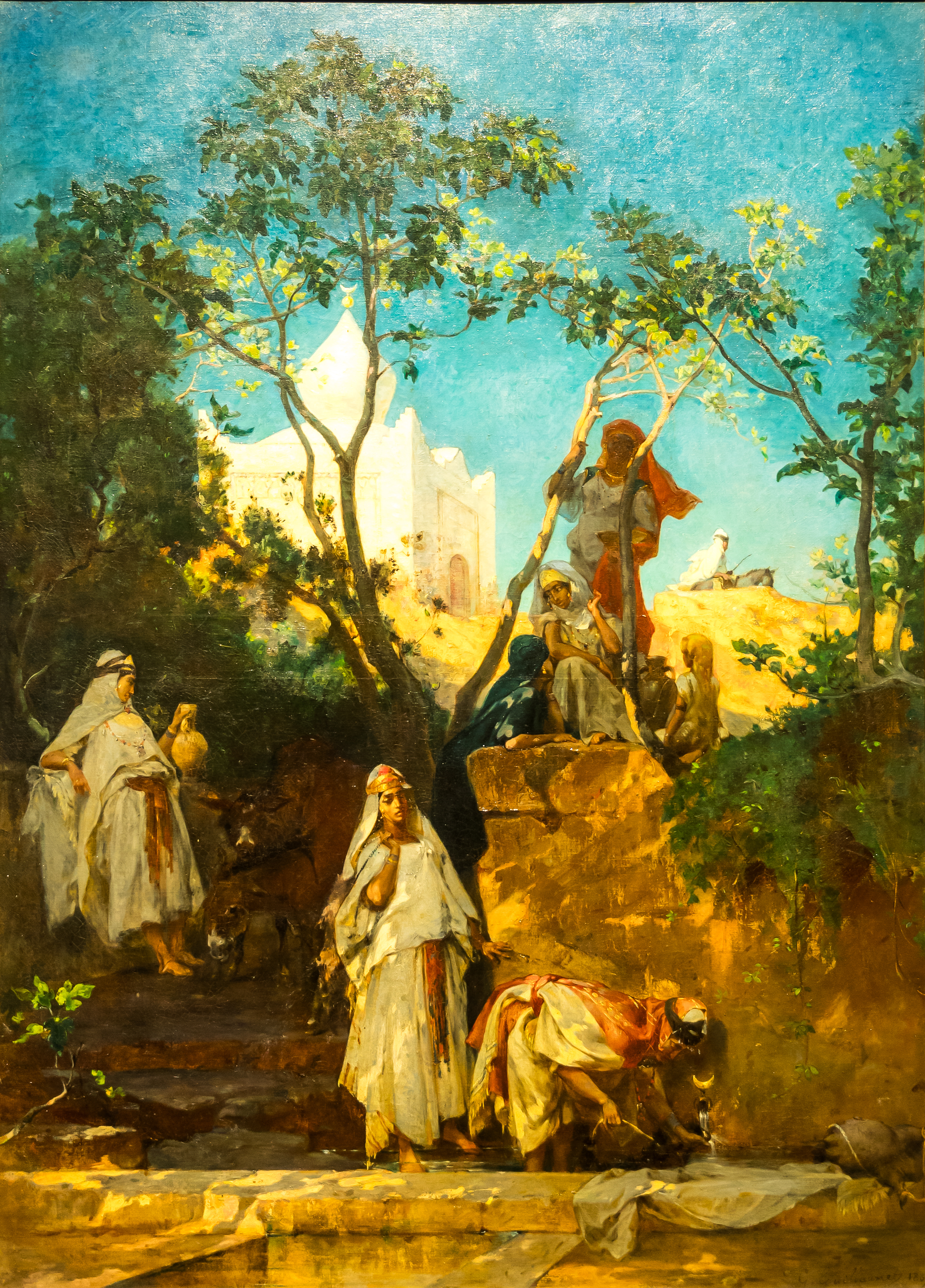
The Source by the Fig Tree at Aïn Kerma by Gustave Achille Guillaumet

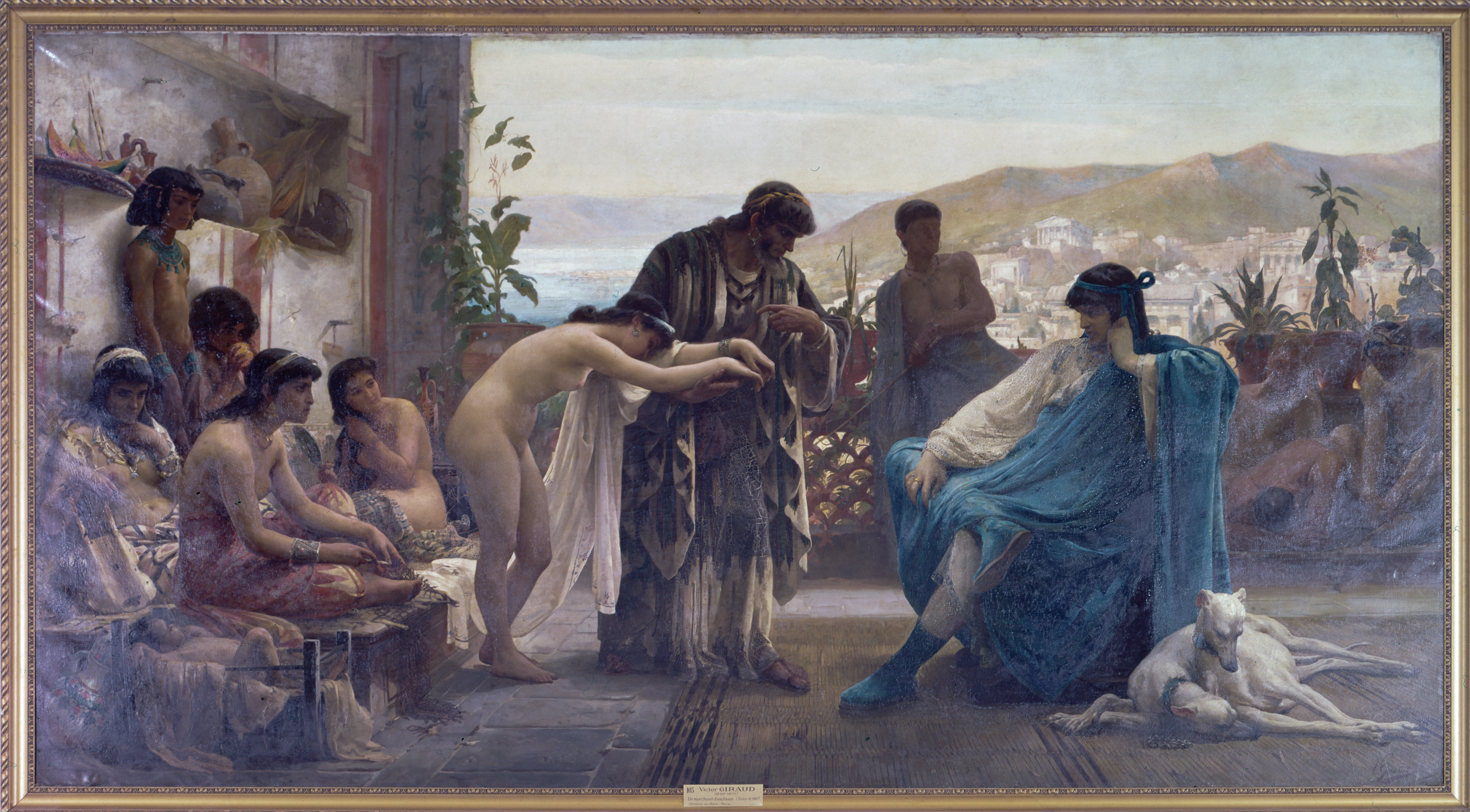
A Slave Market by Victor Giraud

== Bibliography ==
- Chaleyssin, Patrick & Charles, Victoria. James McNeill Whistler. Parkstone International, 2011.
- Mainardi, Patricia. Art and Politics of the Second Empire: The Universal Expositions of 1855 and 1867. Yale University Press, 1987.
