= Scenes in a Library =

Book by Carol Armstrong

Scenes in a Library: Reading the Photograph in the Book, 1843–1875
- Author: Carol Armstrong
- Language: English
- Subject: History of photography, 19th century photography
- Published: 1998 (MIT Press)
- Publication place: United States
- Media type: Print (Hardback)
- Pages: 511
- ISBN: 9780262011693
- OCLC: 185660666

Scenes in a Library: Reading the Photograph in the Book, 1843–1875 is a 1998 book by Carol Armstrong. It is a study of photographically illustrated books from the mid 19th century.

It has been reviewed by The Library Quarterly, Victorian Studies, caa.reviews, and The Art Bulletin,
