= Carol Armstrong =

American art historian, photographer and educator

Carol Armstrong is an American professor, art historian, art critic, and photographer. Armstrong teaches and writes about 19th-century French art, the history of photography, the history and practice of art criticism, feminist theory and women and gender representation in visual culture.

== Education ==
Armstrong received her Ph.D. from Princeton University's Department of Art and Archaeology.

== Career ==
Armstrong taught at the University of California, Berkeley, where she was a Townsend Fellow, and received tenure in 1990. She then taught at the Graduate Center of the City University of New York. She joined the tenured faculty at Princeton University and became the Doris Stevens Professor of Women's Studies in 1999. Later, she was the director of the program in the study of women and gender from 2004 to 2007.

Armstrong then joined the faculty at Yale University in 2007, where she is a professor of the History of Art, and the director of undergraduate studies in art history. At Yale, she is also affiliated with the women's, gender, and sexuality studies, the film and media studies program, and the French department.

Armstrong has curated exhibitions at the J. Paul Getty Museum, Princeton University Art Museum, The Drawing Center in New York, the Yale Center for British Art and the Yale University School of Art's Edgewood Gallery.

== Awards and honors ==
In 1994, she was awarded a Guggenheim Fellowship. She was awarded the Charles Rufus Morey Book Award in 1993 from the College Arts Association for her book Odd Man Out: Readings of the Work and Reputation of Edgar Degas, published by the University of Chicago Press.

== Selected publications ==
- Odd Man Out: Readings of the Work and Reputation of Edgar Degas, The University of Chicago Press, 1991. CAA Charles Rufus Morey Book Award 1993. Republished as a paperback by Getty Research Center Publications in 2006.
- Scenes in a Library: Reading the Photograph in the Book, 1843-1875, M.I.T. Press (October Books), Fall 1998.
- A Degas sketchbook, J Paul Getty Museum Publications, 2000.
- Manet Manette, Yale University Press (London), 2002.
- Ocean Flowers, The Drawing Center (New York) and Princeton University Press, Spring 2004, co-editor and contributor.
- Cézanne in the Studio: Still Life in Watercolors, The J. Paul Getty Museum, 2004.
- Women Artists at the Millennium, coeditor (with Catherine de Zegher) and contributor, The MIT Press 2006.
- Degas: A Strange New Beauty, coauthor, Moma, 2016.
- Line Into Color, Color Into Line: Helen Frankenthaler, Paintings 1962-1987, contributor, Gagosian/Rizzoli, 2017.
- The matter of still life: between Chardin and Morandi. Oakland, California: University of California Press. 2026. ISBN 978-0-520-41699-4.

== Selected curatorial projects ==
- 2001 Camera Women, Princeton University Art Museum.
- 2004 Ocean Flowers: Impressions from Nature, The Drawing Center (New York). and the Yale Center for British Art
- 2004 Cézanne in the Studio: Still Life in Watercolors, The J. Paul Getty Museum.
- 2013 Lunch with Olympia, co-curator, Yale University School of Art’s Edgewood Gallery.
