= Ennui (Sickert) =

Painting by Walter Sickert

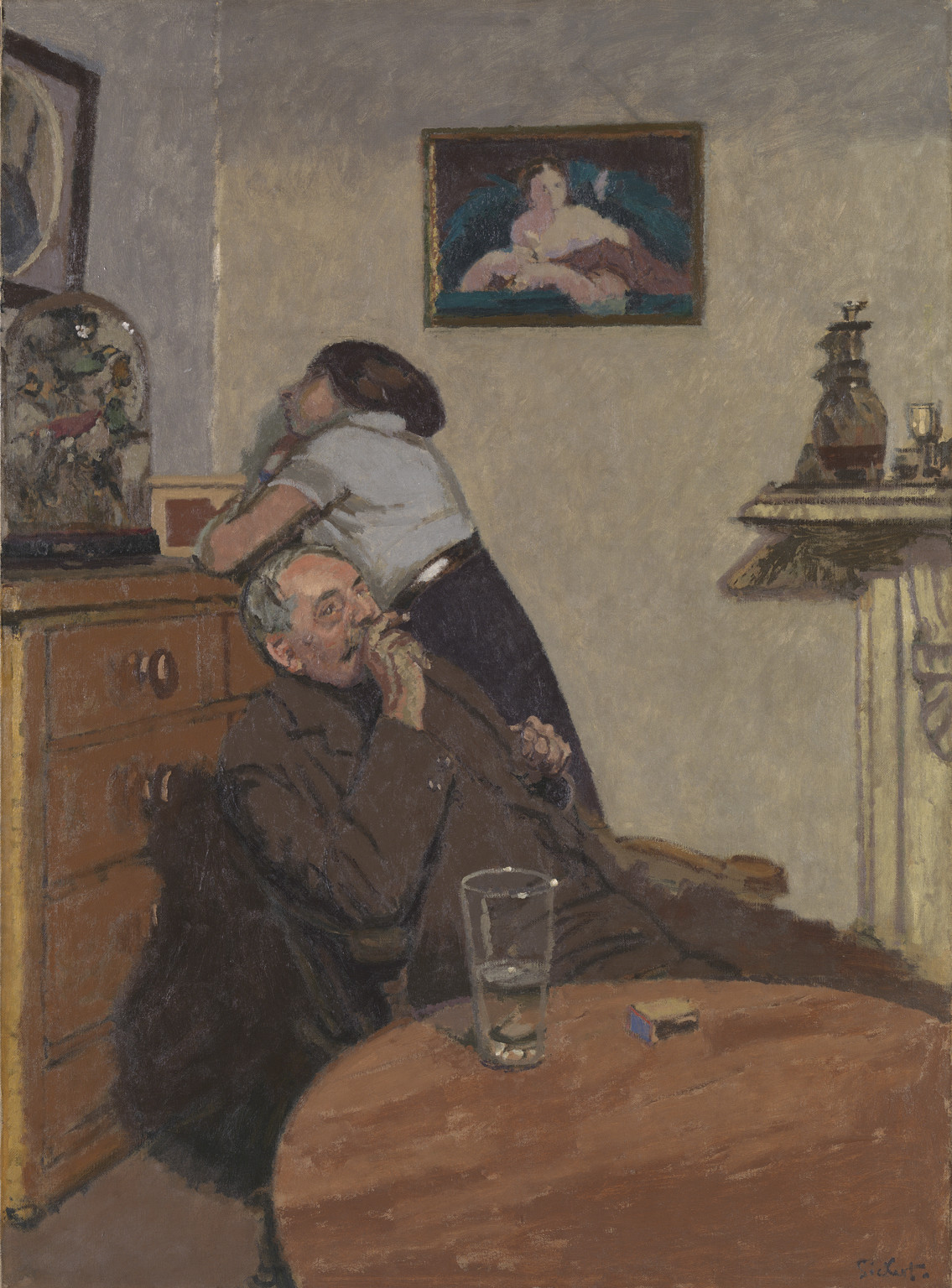
- Artist: Walter Sickert
- Year: 1914
- Medium: Oil on canvas
- Dimensions: 152.4 cm × 112.4 cm (60.0 in × 44.3 in)
- Location: Tate Britain; London

Ennui (English: Boredom) is an oil on canvas painting by the German-British artist Walter Sickert, from 1914. It is considered perhaps his most famous work, and at least five versions of the composition are known. The title in French was given by Sickert himself. The painting is held at Tate Britain, in London.

== Description ==
The scene depicts an elderly man seated, smoking, in front of a table, with a glass upon it, while a woman just looks away. There is no apparent connection between the two figures; rather, they simply seem indifferent to one another. The protagonists’ boredom is combined with a sense of immense fatigue and deep discouragement. The entire scene is charged with tension. Not only the two characters seem not to be in friendly terms, but even the objects in the room seem bristling, ready to crush their owners. In Ennui, the placement and presence of objects play a role at least as important as the couple themselves. For the preparatory photograph, Sickert used for models his own maid, Mary, and an old friend nicknamed Hubby.
