= Clouet =

Clouet is a surname. Notable people with the surname include:

- Hadrien Clouet (born 1991), French politician
- Jean Clouet (1480–1541), French Renaissance miniaturist and painter
- Jean-François Clouet (1751–1801), French metallurgist and chemist
- François Clouet (c. 1510–1572), French Renaissance miniaturist and painter, son of Jean
- Michel Clouet (1770–1836), Canadian businessman and political figure
