= Odd Man Out: Readings of the Work and Reputation of Edgar Degas =

1991 book by Carol Armstrong

- Author: Carol Armstrong
- Language: English
- Subject: Art criticism, Edgar Degas, French art
- Published: 1991 (University of Chicago Press)
- Publication place: United States
- Media type: Print (Hardback)
- Pages: 299
- ISBN: 9780226026954
- OCLC: 21762418

Odd Man Out: Readings of the Work and Reputation of Edgar Degas is a 1991 book by Carol Armstrong. It is about the paradoxes surrounding Edgar Degas and his works.

== Contents ==
1. Degas, the Odd Man Out: The Impressionistic Exhibitions
2. Duranty on Degas: A Theory of Modern Painting
3. Reading the Work of Degas
4. Against the Grain: J.K. Huysmans and the 1886 Series of Nudes
5. The Myth of Degas

== Publication history ==
- 1986, United States, Princeton University OCLC Number 229487323, 472 leaves, Thesis/dissertation manuscript
- 1991, United States, University of Chicago Press ISBN 9780226026954, hardback, 299 pages
- 2003, United States, Getty Publications ISBN 9780892367283, paperback, 300

== Reception ==
Odd Man Out has been reviewed by Art History, The Art Bulletin, The French Review, and The Burlington Magazine.

It won the 1993 Charles Rufus Morey Book Award.
