= At the Piano =

Painting by James McNeill Whistler

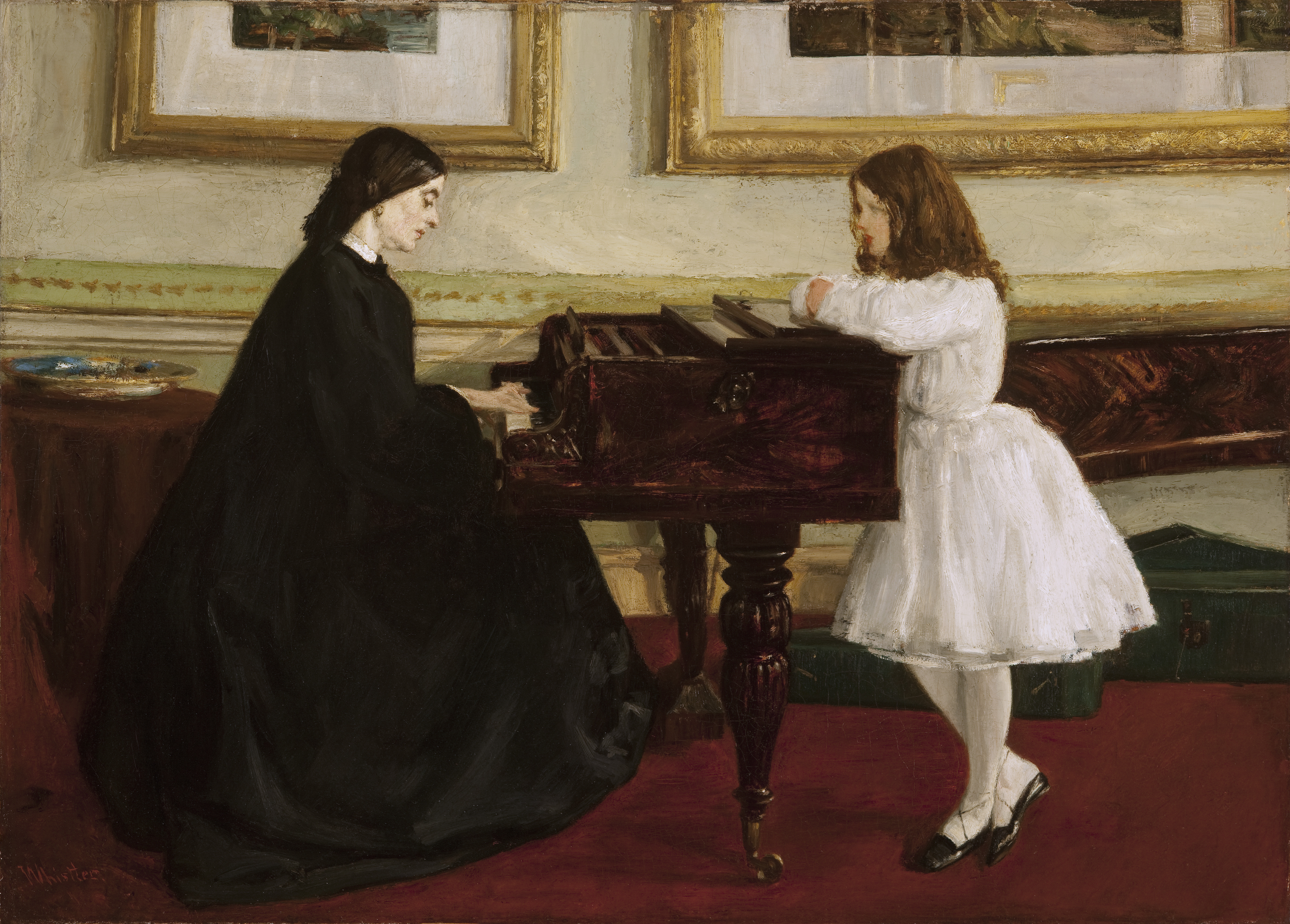
- Artist: James McNeill Whistler
- Year: 1859
- Type: Oil on canvas, portrait painting
- Dimensions: 67 cm × 90.5 cm (26 in × 35.6 in)
- Location: Taft Museum of Art, Cincinnati

At the Piano is an 1859 oil painting by the American artist James McNeill Whistler. After four years years in Paris Whistler moved to London where his married sister Deborah had married and settled. While staying with her, he produced this work of Deborah playing the piano with her daughter. the painting was a popular success and attracted the interest of Whistler's first patron Alexander Constantine Ionides and brought him into contact with Gustave Courbet, Edouard Manet and the Pre-Raphaelites.

While Whistler submitted the work to the Salon of 1859, it was rejected by the selectors. the painting was displayed at the Royal Academy Exhibition of 1860 held at the National Gallery in London and was bought by the painter John Phillip. It later also featured at the Salon of 1867 in Paris. The painting was acquired in 2006 Taft Museum of Art of Cincinnati in Ohio, having previously been in the collection of the Cincinnati Institute of Fine Arts.

== See also ==
- List of paintings by James McNeill Whistler

== Bibliography ==
- Chaleyssin, Patrick & Charles, Victoria. James McNeill Whistler. Parkstone International, 2011.
- Jacobi, Carol (ed.) James McNeill Whistler. Tate Publishing, 2026.
- Sutherland, Daniel E. Whistler: A Life for Art's Sake. Yale University Press, 2014.
