= The Pantheon, from the Terrace of the Luxembourg Gardens =

1893 lithograph by James McNeill Whistler

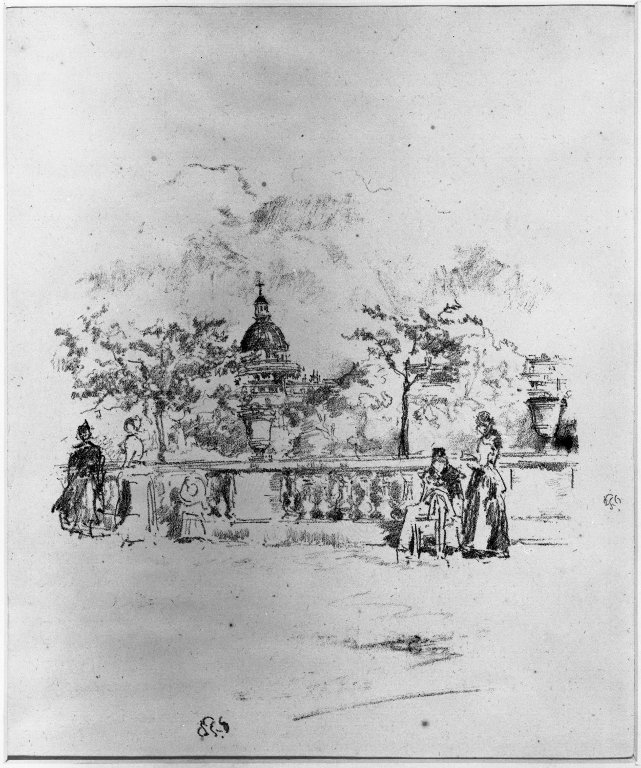
- Artist: James McNeill Whistler
- Year: 1893
- Medium: lithograph

The Pantheon, from the Terrace of the Luxembourg Gardens is a lithograph by the American artist James Abbott McNeill Whistler, created in 1893.

Whistler's friend and printer, Thomas R. Way, wrote the definitive catalogue of Whistler's lithographs. In it, The Pantheon, from the Terrace of the Luxembourg Gardens is listed as catalogue number 45, and he describes it as such: "In the distance the dark dome rises above trees, and the roofs of buildings. In the front, the terrace with stone balustrade crosses the picture; two vases are raised on the stonework, and in front on the right, two ladies, one seated, the other standing, and on the left, two nurses and a child; a cloudy sky above."

Whistler and Way pulled a total of only 15 lifetime impressions, and most are found in museums. The one known to be in private hands belonged to singer and actress Doris Day.
