= 1877 in art =

Events from the year 1877 in art.

== Events ==
- January – Claude Monet begins a series of paintings of the Gare Saint-Lazare in Paris.
- April – Third "Exhibition of Impressionists" arranged by Gustave Caillebotte at 6 rue Le Peletier in Paris.
- May 1 – Grosvenor Gallery Exhibition of 1877. The Grosvenor Gallery in London opens to the public with an exhibition of paintings created over the past featuring Edward Burne-Jones's Days of Creation, The Beguiling of Merlin and The Mirror of Venus and James McNeill Whistler's Nocturne in Black and Gold – The Falling Rocket. On July 2, English art critic John Ruskin's review in Fors Clavigera praises Burne-Jones but of Whistler says he "never expected to hear a coxcomb ask two hundred guineas for flinging a pot of paint in the public's face" provoking a charge of libel.
- May 7 – The Royal Academy Exhibition of 1877 opens at Burlington House in London
- Summer – Frederic Leighton exhibits his bronze Athlete Wrestling with a Python at the Royal Academy of Arts in London, inaugurating a renaissance in contemporary British sculpture which becomes known as the New Sculpture.
- September 6 – The Walker Art Gallery in Liverpool, England, is opened.

== Works ==
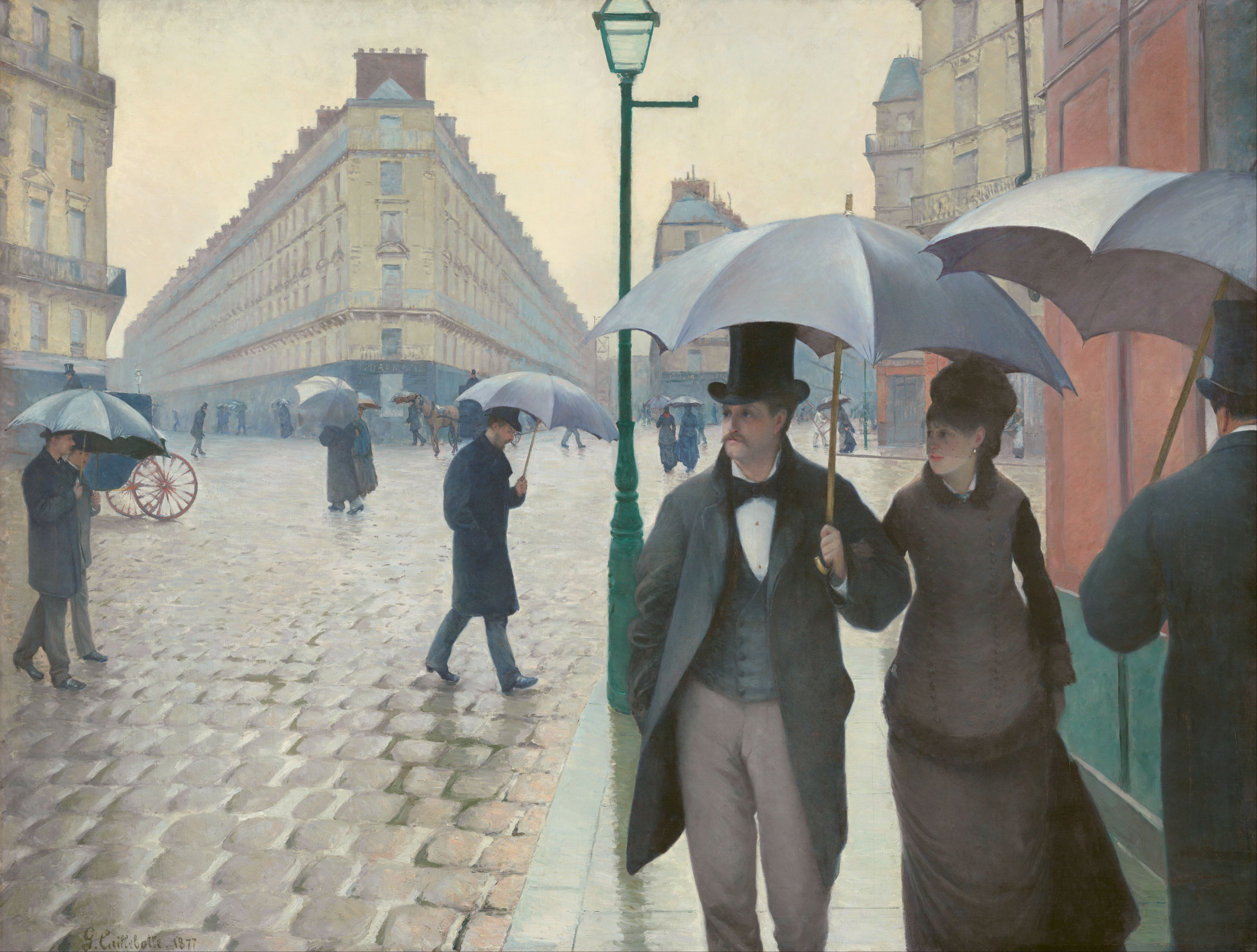
Gustave Caillebotte, Paris Street, Rainy Day, 1877, Art Institute of Chicago.

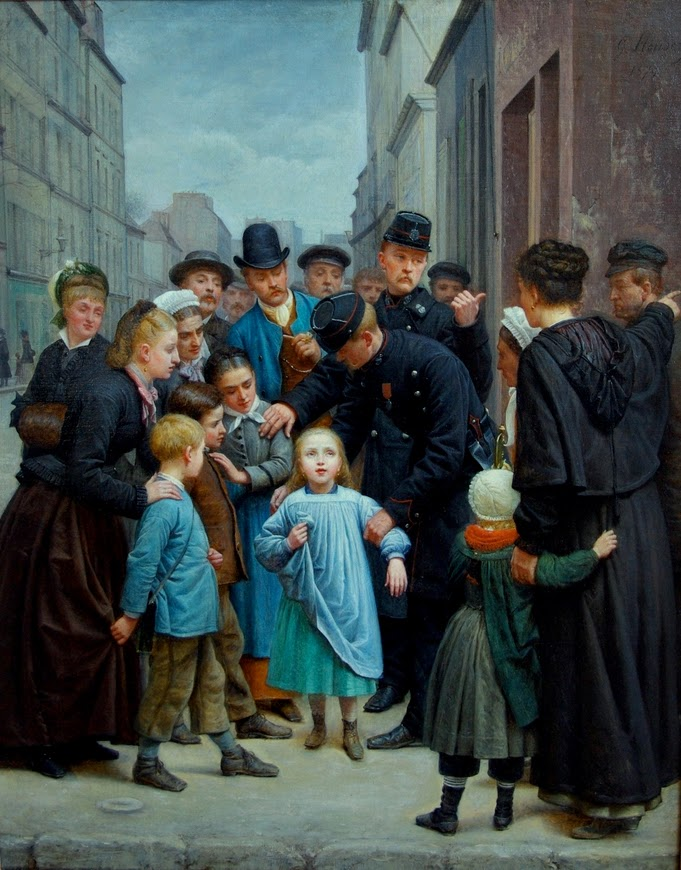
Charles-Gustave Housez La petite fille perdue dans Paris, 1877

=== Paintings ===
- Lawrence Alma-Tadema
  - Flora: Spring in the Gardens of the Villa Borghese
  - A Sculptor's Model
- Jules Bastien-Lepage – At Harvest Time (Tempo di vendemmia)
- Robert Bateman – The Pool of Bethesda
- Frederick Arthur Bridgman – The Funeral Procession of a Mummy on the Nile
- Ford Madox Brown – Cromwell, Protector of the Vaudois
- Gustave Caillebotte
  - On the Pont de l’Europe (Kimbell Art Museum)
  - Paris Street; Rainy Day ("Rue de Paris; Temps de pluie")
  - Skiffs ("Boating on the Yerres") (Milwaukee Art Museum)
- Paul Cézanne
  - Bathers at Rest (The Barnes Foundation, Philadelphia)
  - Madame Cézanne in a Red Armchair (Museum of Fine Arts, Boston)
  - The Eternal Feminine (The J. Paul Getty Museum, Los Angeles)
- Frederic Edwin Church
  - The Aegean Sea
  - El Rio de Luz
- Evelyn De Morgan – Cadmus and Harmonia
- Alphonse-Marie-Adolphe de Neuville – L'attaque au crépuscule ("The attack at dawn"; Walters Art Museum, Baltimore)
- Thomas Eakins – William Rush Carving His Allegorical Figure of the Schuylkill River (original version; Philadelphia Museum of Art)
- Albert Edelfelt – Queen Blanca
- Henri Fantin-Latour – The Reading
- Carl Fredrik Hill – The Cemetery
- John Callcott Horsley – The World Forgetting, By the World Forgot
- Charles-Gustave Housez – La petite fille perdue dans Paris
- Kobayashi Kiyochika – The Sumida River by Night
- Frederic Leighton
  - Mrs Henry Evans Gordon
  - The Music Lesson
- Edwin Long – An Egyptian Feast
- Édouard Manet
  - Nana
  - Plum Brandy
  - Woman in Evening Dress (Guggenheim Museum, New York City)
- Charles Mengin – Sappho
- John Everett Millais
  - Effie Deans
  - Thomas Carlyle
- Claude Monet – Gare Saint Lazare
- Camille Pissarro
  - Côte des Bœufs at L'Hermitage
  - The Garden at Pontoise
- Arthur Quartley – Early Moonlight Naragansett Bay
- Briton Rivière
  - Lazarus
  - Sympathy
- John Singer Sargent – Portrait of Fanny Watts
- John Roddam Spencer Stanhope – Love and the Maiden
- Elizabeth Thompson – The Return from Inkerman
- James Tissot
  - The Gallery of H.M.S. 'Calcutta' (Portsmouth)
  - Hide and Seek
  - Portsmouth Dockyard
- Julius von Blaas – Fox Hunt in the Campagna
- Anton von Werner – Die Proklamation des Deutschen Kaiserreiches ("The Proclamation of the German Empire", original version; destroyed in World War II)
- James McNeill Whistler
  - The Fur Jacket
  - Harmony in Blue and Gold: The Peacock Room (decorative scheme)
  - Nocturne (c. 1875–77, Hunterian Museum and Art Gallery, Glasgow)
- William Frederick Yeames – Amy Robsart

=== Sculpture ===
- Frederic Leighton – Athlete Wrestling with a Python
- Auguste Rodin – The Age of Bronze
- The Defenders of Fort Moultrie

== Births ==
- January 2 – Slava Raškaj, Croatian watercolourist (died 1906)
- January 26 – Kees van Dongen, Dutch-born painter (died 1968)
- February 19 – Gabriele Münter, German painter (died 1962)
- April 15 – Georg Kolbe, German sculptor (died 1947)
- June 3 – Raoul Dufy, French Fauvist painter (died 1953)
- July 2 – Rinaldo Cuneo, American painter (died 1939)
- August 4 – Laura Knight, English Impressionist painter (died 1970)
- August 7 – Leslie Hunter, born George Hunter, Scottish painter (died 1931)
- August 18 – Herbert Barnard John Everett, English marine artist (died 1949)
- December 27 – Adolf Kašpar, Czech painter and illustrator (died 1934)

== Deaths ==
- January 9 – Alexander Brullov, Russian painter, teacher, and architect (born 1798)
- February 13 – Auguste Hüssener, German engraver and miniature painter (born 1789)
- March 31 – Jean Baptiste Madou, painter and lithographer (born 1796)
- June 4 – William Edward Frost, English painter (born 1810)
- August 5 – Philipp Foltz, painter (born 1793)
- September 16 – Marcin Zaleski, Polish painter (born 1796)
- September 17 – William Fox Talbot, pioneer photographer (born 1800)
- November 12 – Henry Peters Gray, portrait painter (born 1819)
- December 18 – Philipp Veit, painter (born 1819)
- December 31 – Gustave Courbet, painter (born 1819)
