= HMS Windsor Castle (1858) =

Ship of the line of the Royal Navy

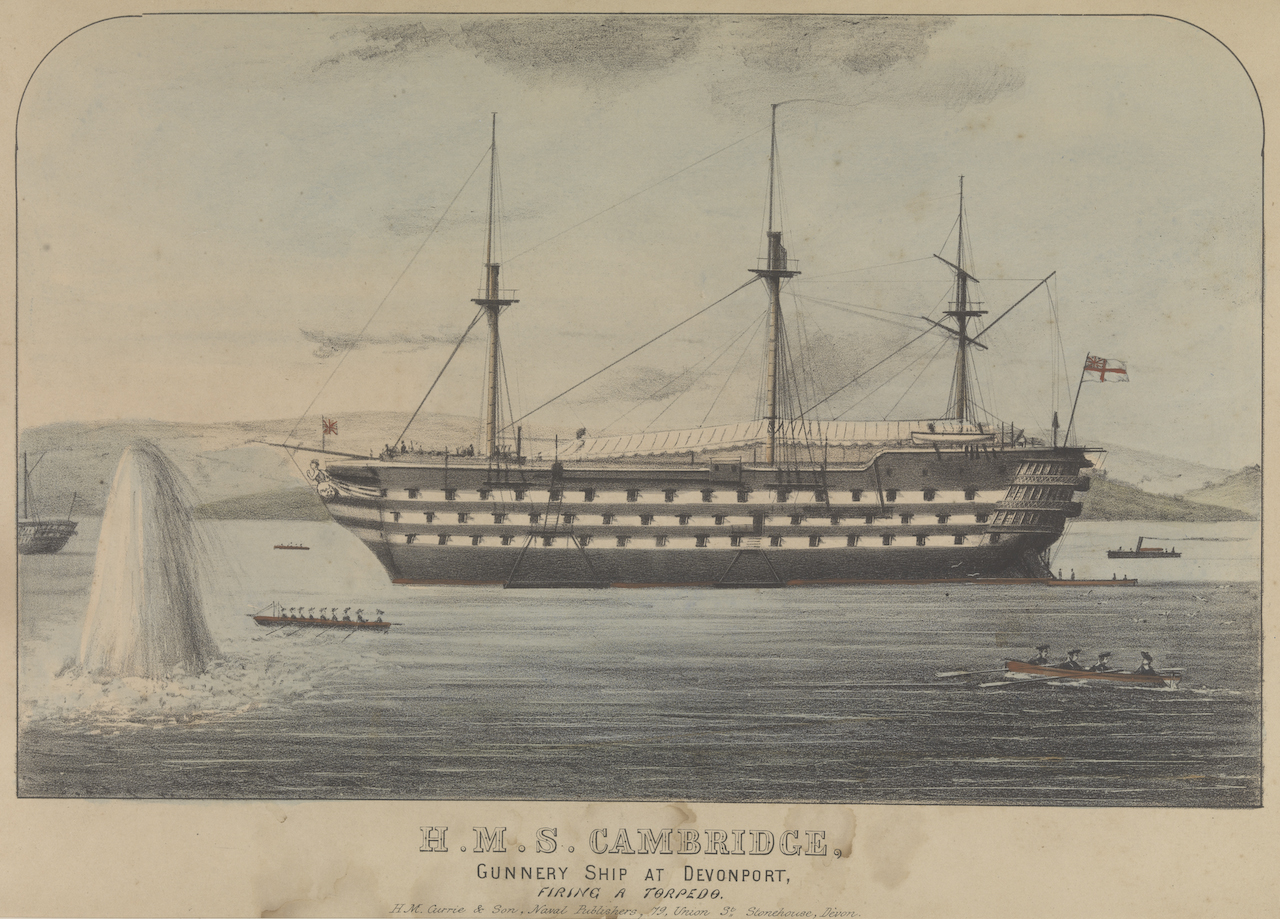
- Cambridge firing a torpedo

History

United Kingdom
- Name: Windsor Castle
- Namesake: Windsor Castle
- Ordered: 3 October 1833; Reordered on 29 June 1848 to modified sail design; Reordered on 28 February 1857 to modified steam design
- Builder: Pembroke Dockyard
- Laid down: May 1844
- Launched: 26 August 1858
- Commissioned: January 1869
- Renamed: Laid down as Victoria; Renamed Windsor Castle, 6 January 1855; Renamed Cambridge, 1869
- Fate: Sold for scrap, 24 June 1908

General characteristics (as completed)
- Class & type: Queen-class ship of the line
- Tons burthen: 3,099 16/94 (bm)
- Length: 204 ft (62.2 m) (gun deck)
- Beam: 60 ft (18.3 m)
- Depth of hold: 23 ft 9 in (7.2 m)
- Installed power: Boilers; 2,052 ihp (1,530 kW)
- Propulsion: 1 shaft; 1 trunk steam engine
- Sail plan: Full-rigged ship
- Speed: 11 knots (20 km/h; 13 mph)
- Complement: 930
- Armament: 102 muzzle-loading, smoothbore guns: Lower deck: 30 × 8 in (203 mm) shell guns; Middle gun deck: 30 × 32 pdr guns; Upper gun deck: 30 × 32 pdr guns; Quarterdeck & Forecastle: 10 × 32 pdr guns + 2 × 68 pdr guns

HMS Windsor Castle was a 102-gun, three-deck, first-rate, Queen-class ship of the line built for the Royal Navy (RN) during the 1850s. She was converted to screw-propulsion while still under construction. Completed in 1859, the ship spent her whole career in ordinary or as a training ship and never saw active duty at sea. She was renamed Cambridge in 1869, when she replaced a ship of the same name as a gunnery training ship at Devonport. Cambridge occasionally served as a flagship. She was sold for scrap in 1908.

== Background and description ==
Windsor Castle was originally designed as a sister of the 110-gun Queen, but was modified while under construction in 1848 to a 116-gun design. Still incomplete, she was ordered to be converted to screw propulsion with an armament of 120 guns in 1857. Stability issues meant that her forecastle and quarterdeck were cut down in height and her armament was reduced to 102 guns in an unsuccessful attempt resolve the issues. The ship measured 204 feet (62.2 m) on the gundeck and 166 feet 5 inches (50.7 m) on the keel. She had a beam of 60 feet (18.3 m), and a depth of hold of 23 feet 9 inches (7.24 m). Windsor Castle had a tonnage of 3,099 16/94 tons burthen. Her crew numbered 930 officers and ratings.

Windsor Castle was powered by a two-cylinder, horizontal trunk steam engine that was rated at 500 nominal horsepower. The engine was built by John Penn and Sons and the ship's boilers produced enough steam for the engine to produce 2,052 indicated horsepower (1,530 kW; 2,080 PS) during her sea trials on 7 May 1859 which gave her a maximum speed of 11 knots (20 km/h; 13 mph), albeit without masts or supplies. She had three masts and was ship rigged.

The ship's muzzle-loading, smoothbore armament consisted of thirty 8 in (203 mm) shell guns on her lower gun deck, thirty 32-pounder (56 cwt) guns (Note: "Cwt" is the abbreviation for hundredweight, 56 cwt referring to the weight of the gun.) on the middle gun deck and thirty 32-pounder (42 cwt) guns on her upper gun deck. Between her forecastle and quarterdeck, she carried ten 32-pounder (42 cwt) guns and a pair of 68-pounder (95 cwt) guns on pivot mounts. By 1862 her armament had been reduced to 97 guns, including a number of rifled, breech-loading Armstrong guns, notably a single 110-pounder on a pivot mount, four 70-pounders and six 40-pounders. Windsor Castle retained fifty-six 32-pounders.

== Construction and career ==
Named for the royal fortress, Windsor Castle was ordered on 3 October 1833 with the name of Victoria in honour of the Princess Victoria, heir to the British throne. She was not laid down at Pembroke Dockyard until May 1844, but work was suspended on 9 December. The ship was reordered on 29 June 1848 to a modified design, and reordered again on 28 February 1857 when she was ordered to be converted from sail to screw propulsion whilst on the stocks and to be fitted for 120 guns. She was renamed Windsor Castle, the fourth ship of her name to serve in the RN, to release her name for the recently ordered 121-gun three-decker on 6 January 1855.

She was launched by Lady Pakington on 26 August 1858, and was towed to HM Dockyard, Devonport, on 18 September to be completed. The ship performed badly during her sea trials and was immediately placed in ordinary upon her completion on 2 February 1859. By 1862 she had been reduced to 97 guns.

=== Gunnery school ===
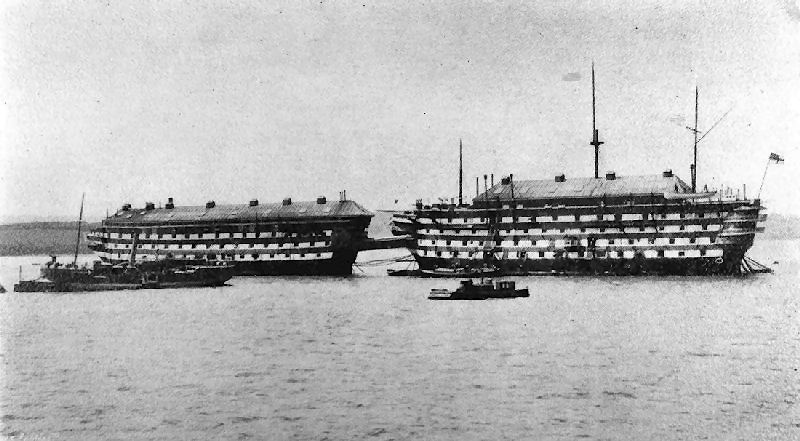
The training school hulks of HMS Calcutta (left) and HMS Cambridge (right) at Devonport, c.1890

She was renamed HMS Cambridge in 1869, when she was hulked and replaced a ship of the same name in January 1869 as the stationary gunnery training ship at Devonport. The ship was commanded by Captain Fitzgerald Foley at that time. On 8 December 1872, she was driven ashore in a storm. At that point, she was armed with 29 guns. She was refloated the next day. Rear-Admiral Assheton Curzon-Howe hoisted his flag on board as second in command of the Channel Squadron. The gunnery school moved ashore in 1907 and Cambridge was sold to Cox on 24 June 1908 to be broken up at Falmouth.
