= Westminster Bridge (Whistler) =

Painting by James McNeill Whistler

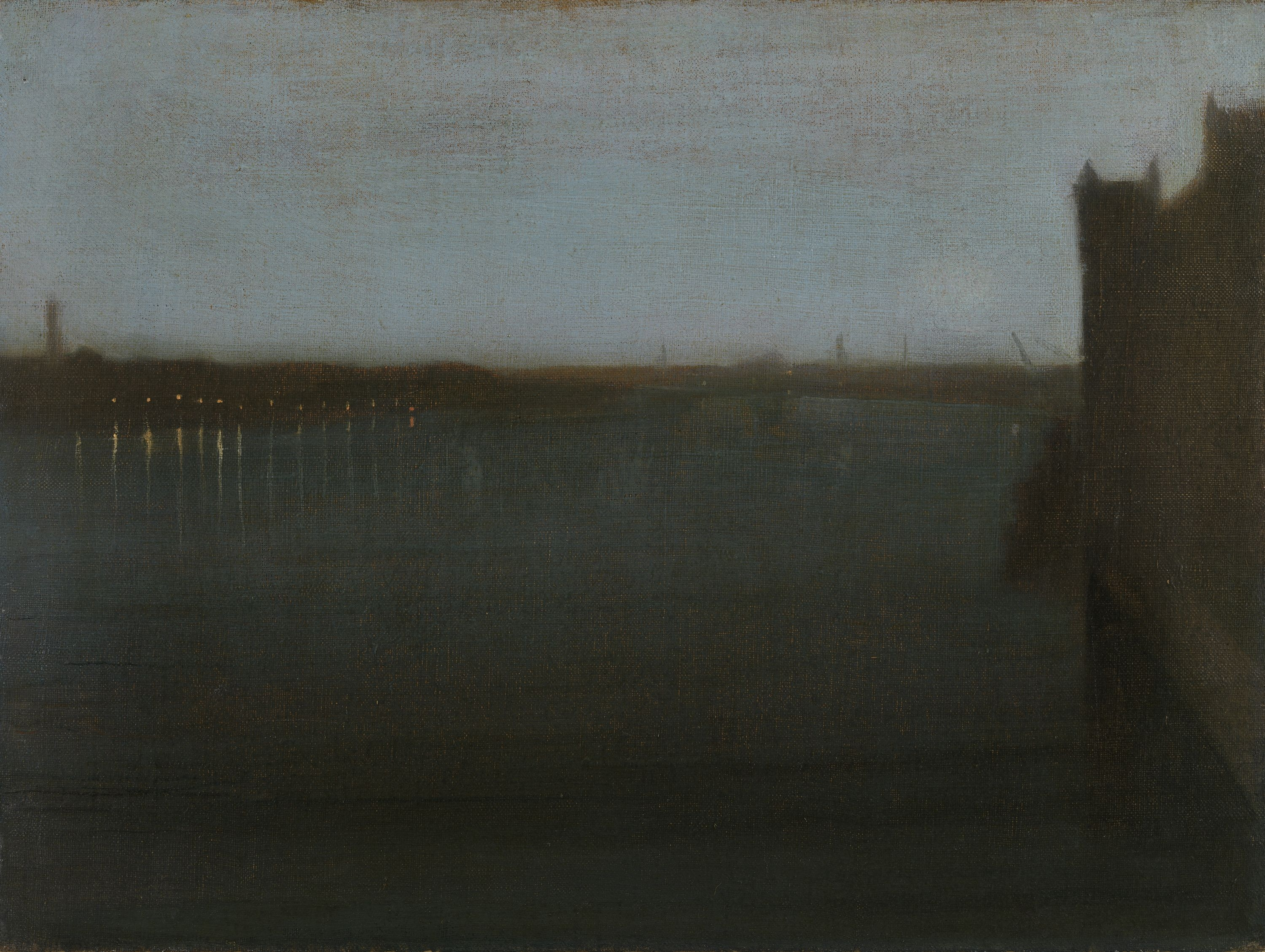
- Artist: James McNeill Whistler
- Year: c.1874
- Type: Oil on canvas, landscape painting
- Dimensions: 47 cm × 63 cm (19 in × 25 in)
- Location: Burrell Collection, Glasgow

Nocturne, Grey and Gold, Westminster Bridge is a c.1874 oil painting by the American-born artist James McNeill Whistler. It features a view of the River Thames at Westminster looking westwards. Two towers of the Houses of Parliament are shown on the right. Despite the title it shows the view from Westminster Bridge rather than depicting it.

It was one of a series of Nocturnes Whistler produced during the decade whose style reflected the emerging Impressionism. Whistler first exhibited the work at the Dudley Gallery in 1875 under the different title Nocturne in Blue and Gold. The painting was one of four nocturnes that Whistler submitted to the inaugural Grosvenor Gallery Exhibition of 1877 in New Bond Street, which led to a famous libel trial following a negative review by the art critic John Ruskin. It had been sold two years earlier to Percy Wyndham for £210. During the trial Whistler claimed the market value ot similar pictures had fallen sharply following Ruskin's remarks. Today it forms part of the Burrell Collection in Glasgow.

== See also ==
- List of paintings by James McNeill Whistler

== Bibliography ==
- Denney, Colleen. At the Temple of Art: The Grosvenor Gallery, 1877-1890 . Fairleigh Dickinson University Press, 2000.
- Jacobi, Carol (ed.) James McNeill Whistler. Tate Publishing, 2026.
- Murphy, Paul Thomas. Falling Rocket: James Whistler, John Ruskin, and the Battle for Modern Art, Simon & Schuster, 2023.
- McConkey, Kenneth. A Free Spirit: Irish Art, 1860-1960. Antique Collectors' Club, 1990.
- Sutherland, Daniel E. Whistler: A Life for Art's Sake. Yale University Press, 2014.
