= HMS Calcutta (1831) =

Ship of the line of the Royal Navy

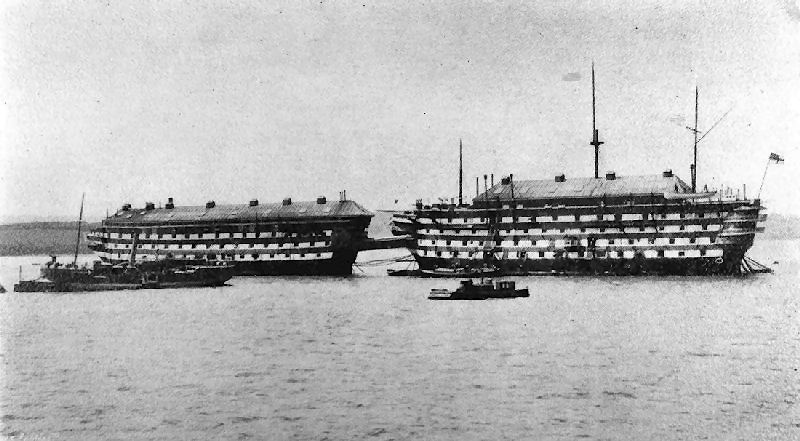
- The hulks of HMS Calcutta (left) and HMS Cambridge (right) off Plymouth, c. 1890

History

United Kingdom
- Name: HMS Calcutta
- Ordered: 4 April 1827
- Builder: Bombay Dockyard
- Laid down: March 1828
- Launched: 14 March 1831
- Fate: Sold, 1908

General characteristics
- Class & type: 84-gun second-rate ship of the line
- Tons burthen: 2,291 bm
- Length: 196 ft 1.66 in (59.7830 m) (gundeck)
- Beam: 50 ft 9 in (15.47 m)
- Depth of hold: 21 ft (6.4 m)
- Sail plan: Full-rigged ship
- Complement: 720 officers and ratings
- Armament: 84 guns: Gundeck: 30 × 32 pdrs; Upper gundeck: 32 × 24 pdrs; Quarterdeck: 6 × 24 pdrs, 10 × 32 pdr carronades; Forecastle: 2 × 24 pdrs, 4 × 32 pdr carronades

HMS Calcutta was an 84-gun second-rate ship of the line of the Royal Navy, built in teak to a draught by Sir Robert Seppings and launched on 14 March 1831 at Bombay. She was the only ship ever built to her draught. She carried her complement of smooth-bore, muzzle-loading guns on two gundecks. Her complement was 720 men (38 officers, 69 petty officers, 403 seamen, 60 boys and 150 marines).

== History ==
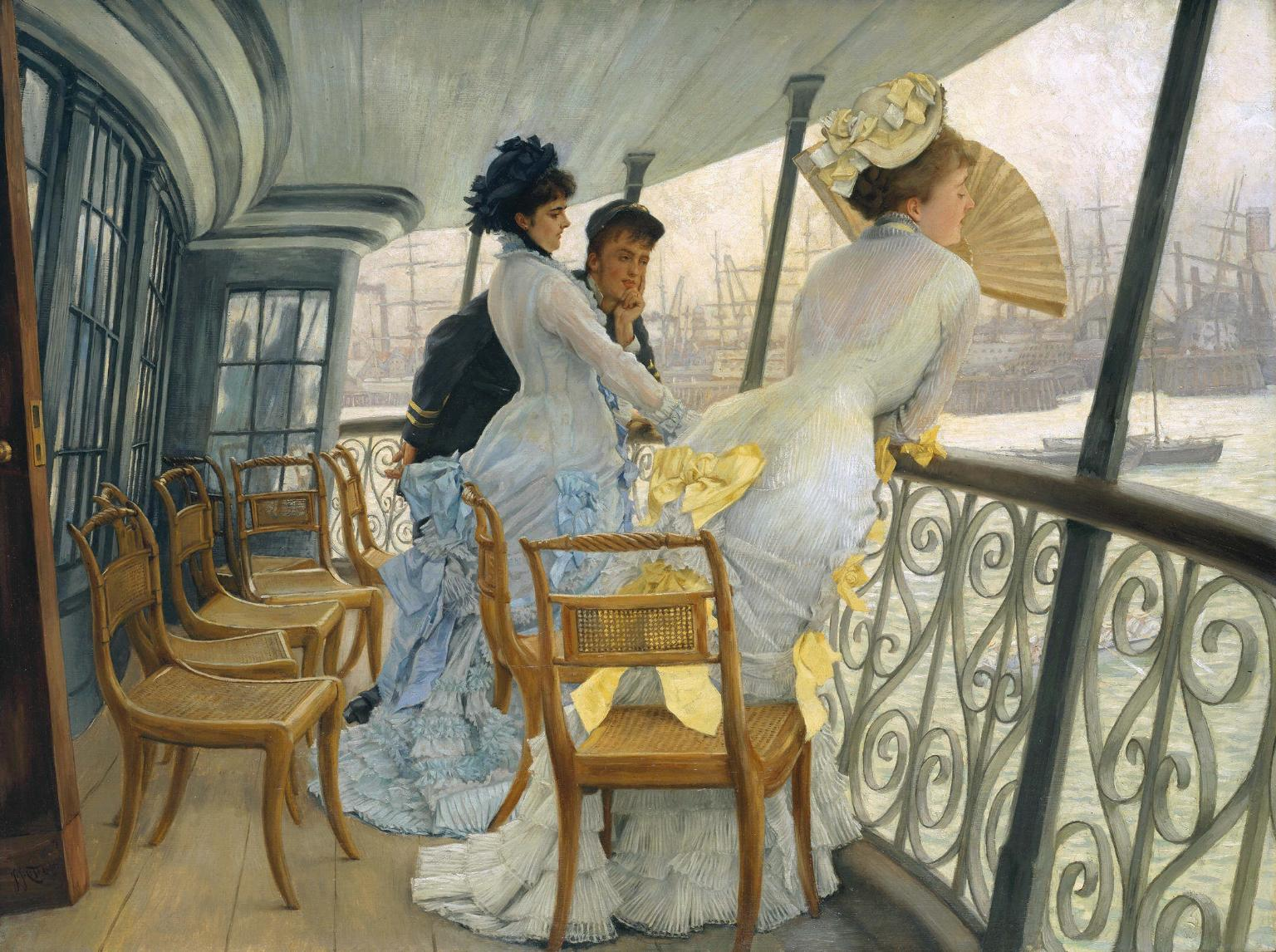
The Gallery of H.M.S. 'Calcutta' (Portsmouth), moored at Portsmouth about 1876, painted by Tissot

In 1855 the ship had been in reserve, but was recommissioned due to the Crimean War and sailed for the Baltic Sea. After two months she was sent home again, as being useless for modern naval actions.

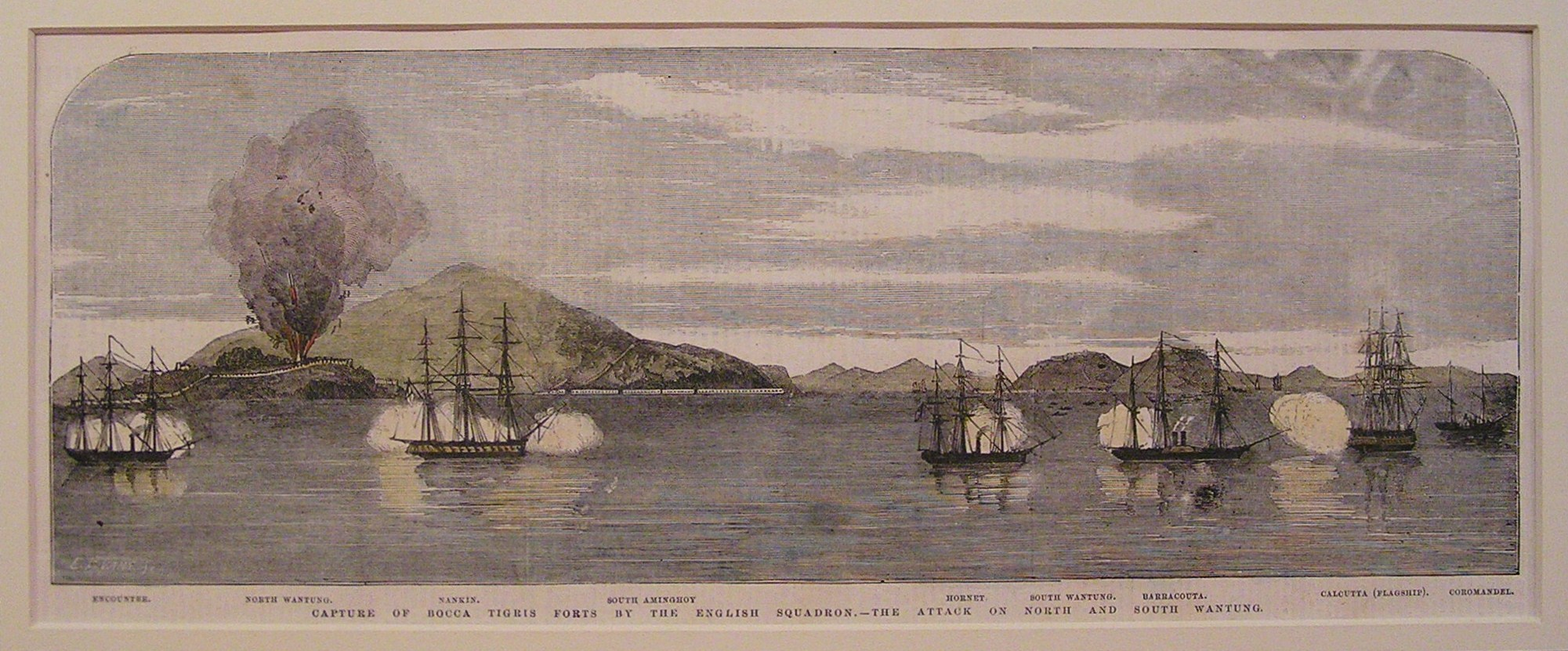
Calcutta at the capture of the Bocca Tigris forts in 1856

She saw action in the Second Opium War as the flagship of Rear Admiral Sir Michael Seymour, under the command of Captain William King-Hall. In 1858 Calcutta visited Nagasaki where she stayed for one week, becoming the first ship-of-the-line to visit Japan.

After returning to home waters, Calcutta was placed back into reserve at Devonport, Devon. In 1865, she was moved to Portsmouth where she served as an Experimental Gunnery Ship, moored ahead of HMS Excellent. In 1889, the gunnery school HMS Excellent was turned into a shore establishment, and Calcutta returned to Devonport where she was attached via a bridge to HMS Cambridge as part of the Devonport Gunnery School.

She was sold for breaking up in 1908. Her figurehead was acquired by Admiral Lord Fisher, then First Sea Lord, as she had been his first seagoing ship. In 2013 the figurehead was restored and transferred to the National Museum of the Royal Navy.

== See also ==
- James Tissot

== Bibliography ==
- Colledge, J. J.; Warlow, Ben & Bush, Steve (2020). Ships of the Royal Navy: The Complete Record of all Fighting Ships of the Royal Navy from the 15th Century to the Present (5th revised and updated ed.). Seaforth Publishing. ISBN 978-1-5267-9327-0.
- Lavery, Brian (1984). The Ship of the Line. Vol. 1: The Development of the Battlefleet 1650-1850. Naval Institute Press. ISBN 0-85177-252-8.
- Lambert, Andrew D. (1991). The Last Sailing Battlefleet: Maintaining Naval Mastery 1815 - 1850. Conway Maritime Press. ISBN 0-85177-591-8.
- Mackay, Ruddock F. Fisher of Kilverstone. London: Oxford University Press, 1973.
- Manning, T. D. & Walker, C. F. (1959). British Warship Names. Putnam. OCLC 838607.
- Winfield, Rif (2014). British Warships in the Age of Sail 1817–1863: Design, Construction, Careers and Fates. Seaforth Publishing. ISBN 978-1-84832-169-4.
