= The Gallery of H.M.S. 'Calcutta' (Portsmouth) =

Painting by James Tissot

The Gallery of HMS 'Calcutta' (Portsmouth)
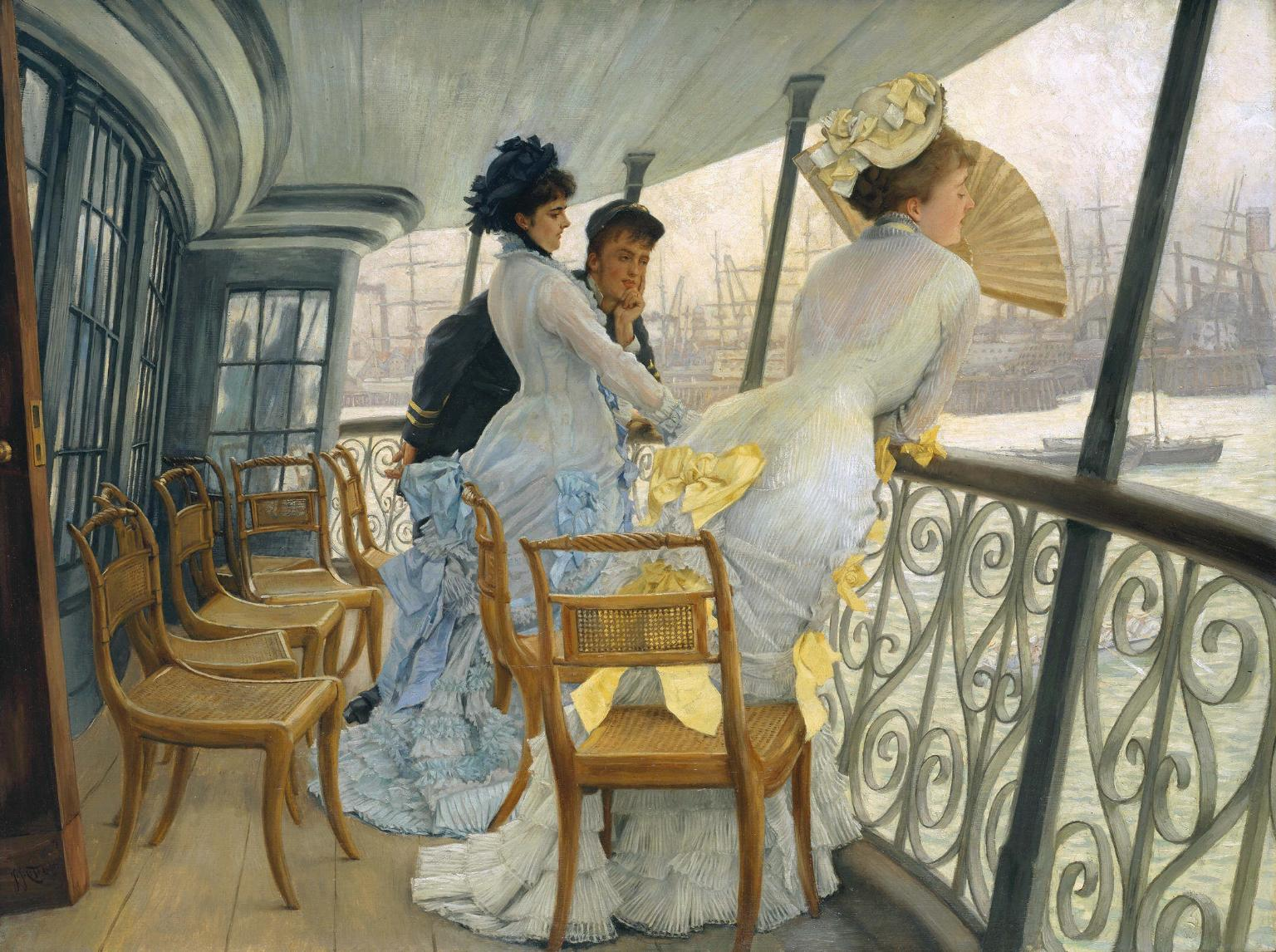
- Artist: James Tissot
- Year: 1876
- Type: Oil on canvas
- Dimensions: 68.6 cm × 91.8 cm (27.0 in × 36.1 in)
- Location: Tate Britain, London

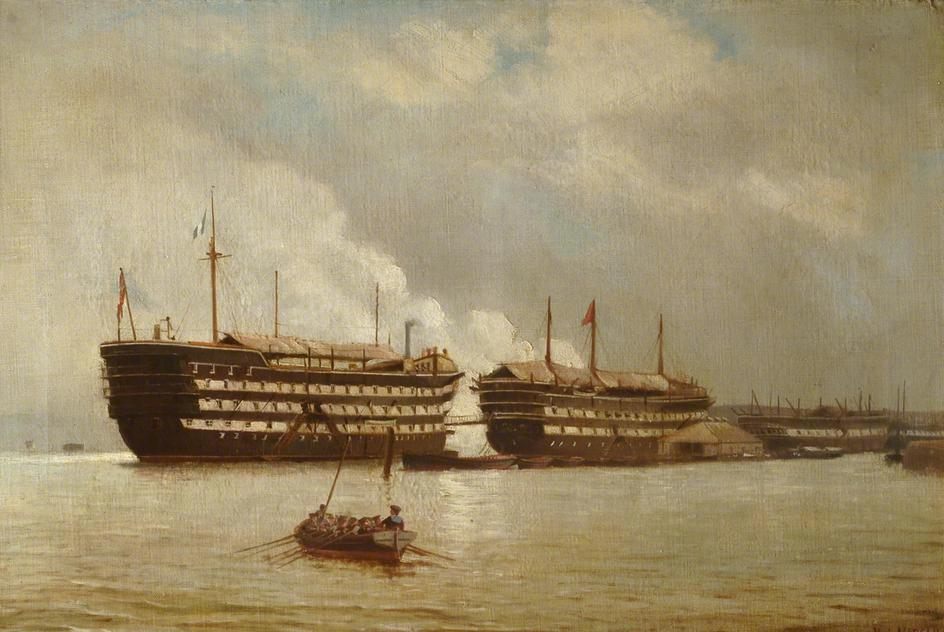
HMS Excellent, c.1860

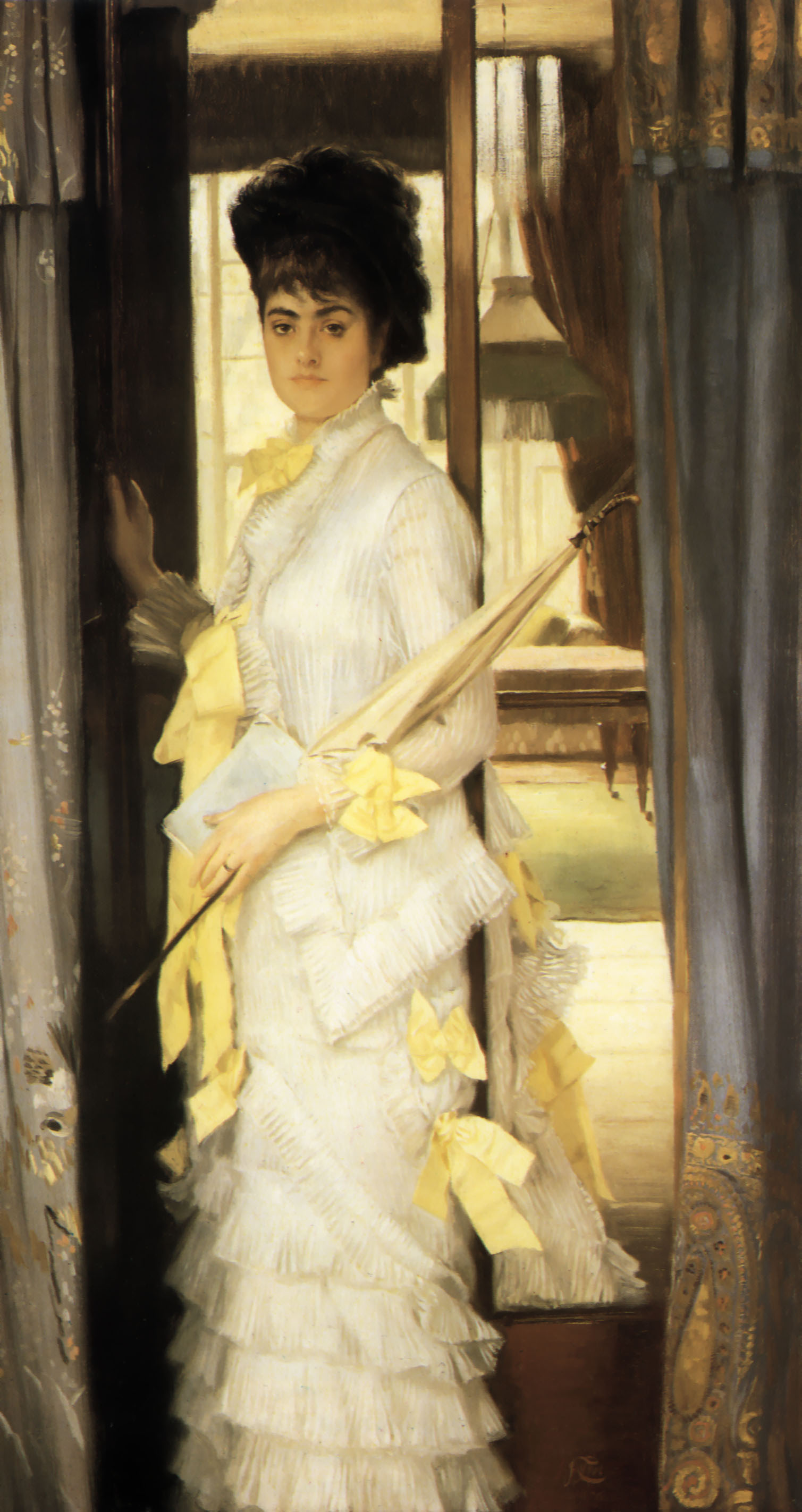
James Tissot, Summer, 1876, Tate

The Gallery of HMS 'Calcutta' (Portsmouth), also known as Officer and Ladies on Board HMS Calcutta, is an 1876 oil painting by the French artist James Tissot. It depicts two ladies in fashionable clothing and a young naval lieutenant, standing on the quarter gallery at the stern of the Royal Navy warship HMS Calcutta. The Tate Gallery in London holds the painting and measures 68.6 by 91.8 centimetres (27.0 in × 36.1 in).

== Background ==
HMS Calcutta was an 84-gun second rate ship of the line, built from teak in Bombay in 1831. After a period in reserve, she was recommissioned in 1855 to serve in the Baltic in the Crimean War, and then served in the Second Opium War in the Far East in 1856-8. She was the British ship of the line to visit Japan in 1858. She became a gunnery training ship in 1865 in Portsmouth Dockyard. Astern of the Calcutta was the hulk of HMS Queen Charlotte which housed the navy's gunnery school, HMS Excellent. She was later moved to Devonport, Devon, after HMS Excellent was moved ashore.

Tissot was a French painter. He left Paris after the Franco-Prussian War and resided in London from 1871. He knew James McNeill Whistler and Edgar Degas, but turned away from Impressionism, and made mainly portraits and genre paintings of the Victorian upper classes in a more polished academic style.

== Painting ==
The Gallery is typical of Tissot's work, depicting his subjects with almost photographic realism, with an ambiguous narrative that hints at risqué behaviour among the wealthy classes approaching or transgressing boundaries of propriety.

Tissot's work depicts two women with a young man in a flirtatious situation, but with a dangerous sensual undercurrent of moral uncertainty. The man is dressed plainly in the uniform of a junior naval officer. Each woman is wearing a fashionable gauzy white dress decorated with bows and ribbons, with a tightly fitting bodice over a corset and full skirts below the hips.

One woman, in a dress decorated with yellow ribbons, is leaning over the railing of the ship's quarter gallery, turning her head away as she hides her face from the naval officer behind her fan. In the language of the fan, an open fan over the left ear indicates "do not betray our secret". Her hourglass figure is echoed by the curves of the gallery's iron railings. Tissot's reference to HMS Calcutta may be making a punning on the French phrase "Quel cul tu as" ("What an arse you have"). Another woman in similar white dress with yellow ribbons appears in Tissot's 1876 painting Summer.

The second woman in the painting, wearing a dress with blue ribbons, may be a chaperone, or possibly the officer's wife: he stands beside her, and wears a wedding ring, but he only has eyes for the first woman. The presence of others at the party is suggested by a line of chairs beside the windows of the gallery: perhaps they are sitting out a dance at a ball on board. Several troop ships are in the background, under smoky grey skies.

Tissot pays attention to the details of the women's clothing and the ship's railings. His realistic style takes its sense of colour and light from the Impressionists, but the asymmetric composition may be influenced by Japanese printmaking.

Tissot made a drypoint version of the work in 1876, reproduced as an etching, 10.375 by 14.25 inches (26.35 cm × 36.20 cm), with the subtitle Memory of a Ball on Board ("La Galerie du 'Calcutta' (Souvenir d'un bal à bord)"). It was printed in The Graphic magazine with the title "Souvenir of a Ball on Shipboard".

== Reception ==
Tissot's elegant depictions of passing fashions in sophisticated London society, with their ambiguous undercurrents, were criticised as immoral and superficial. Oscar Wilde criticised Tissot and his "hard unscrupulousness in painting uninteresting objects in an uninteresting way". Henry James contemptuously described The Gallery of HMS Calcutta as "hard, vulgar and banal".

The painting was displayed at the Grosvenor Gallery in London at the inaugural exhibition of 1877, after it had been sold to Scottish painter John Robertson Reid. It was later sold to Henry Trengrouse. After his death, it was bought by the Leicester Galleries in London in 1929 for 16 guineas, and then sold to Samuel Courtauld, who donated it to the Tate Gallery in 1936.

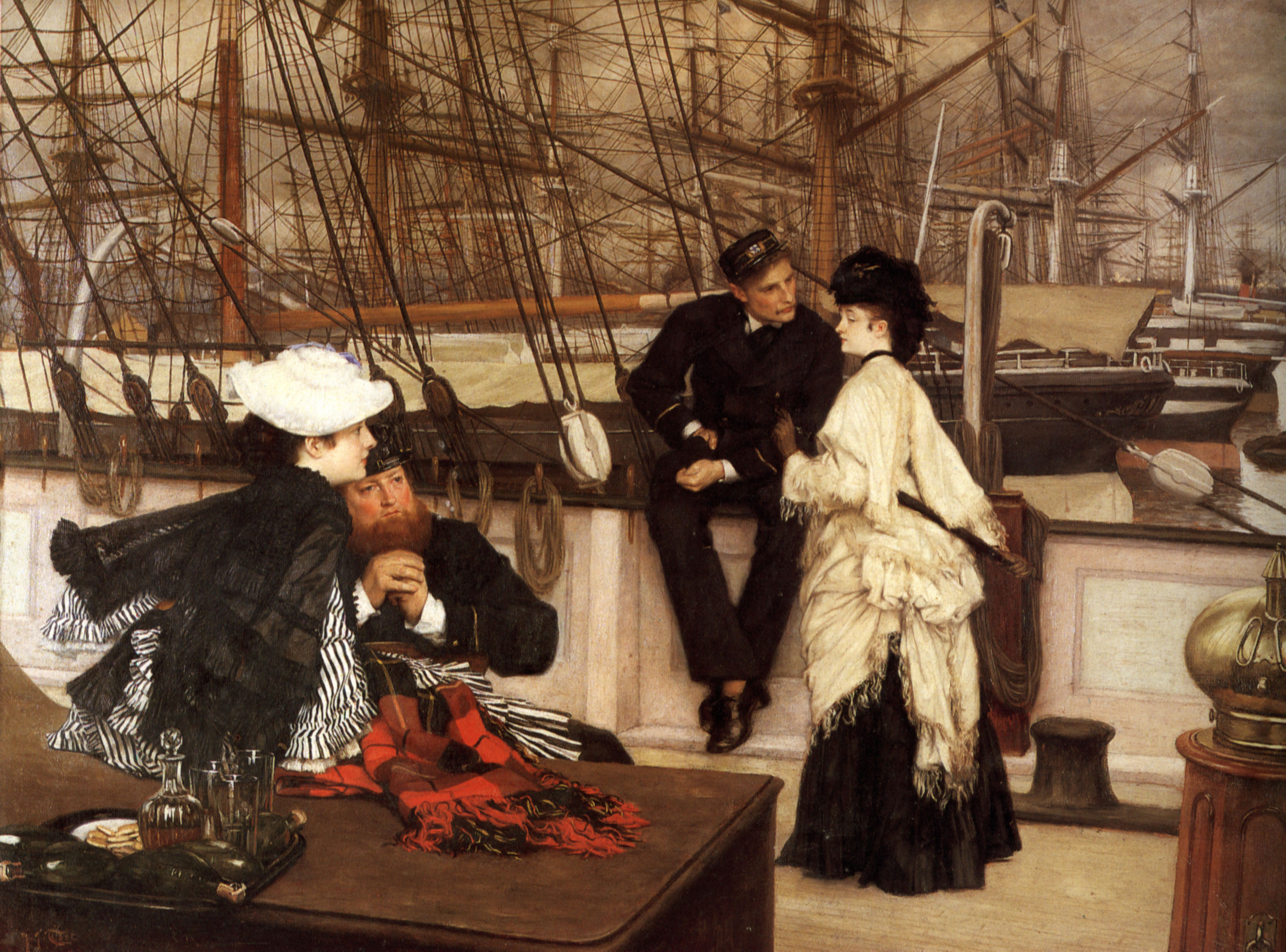
The Captain and the Mate, 1873

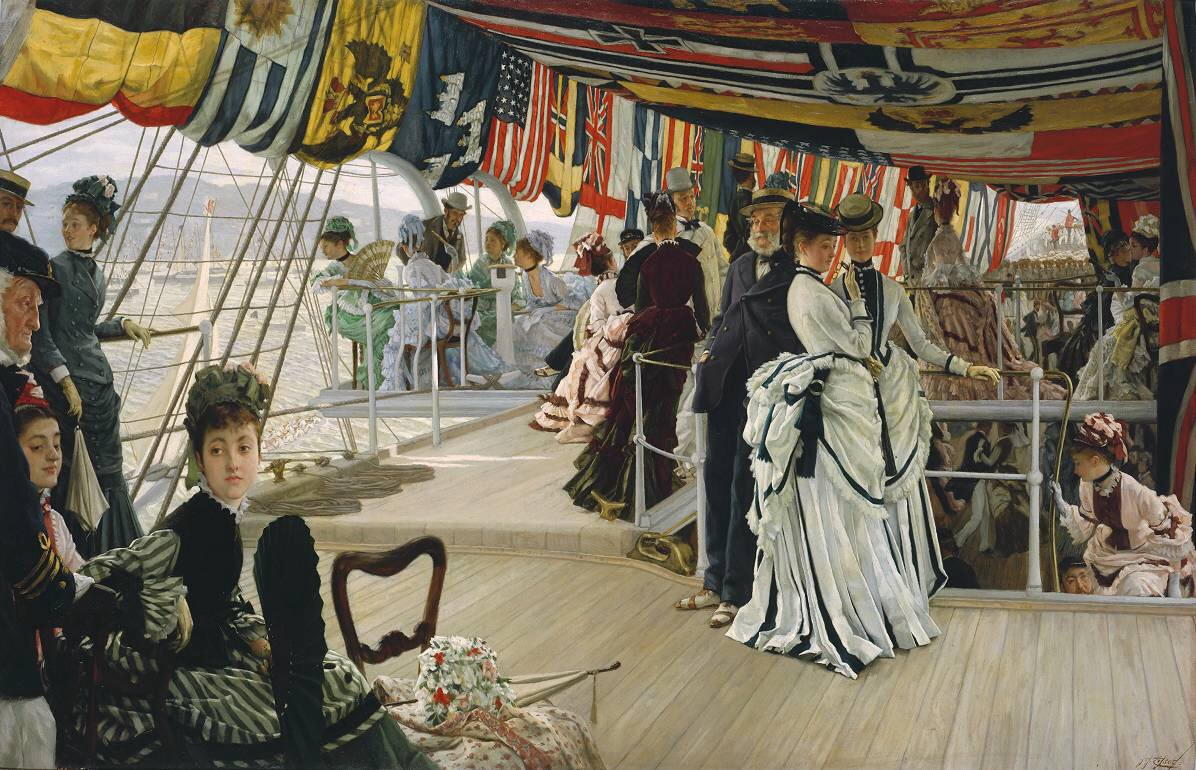
The Ball on Shipboard, 1874

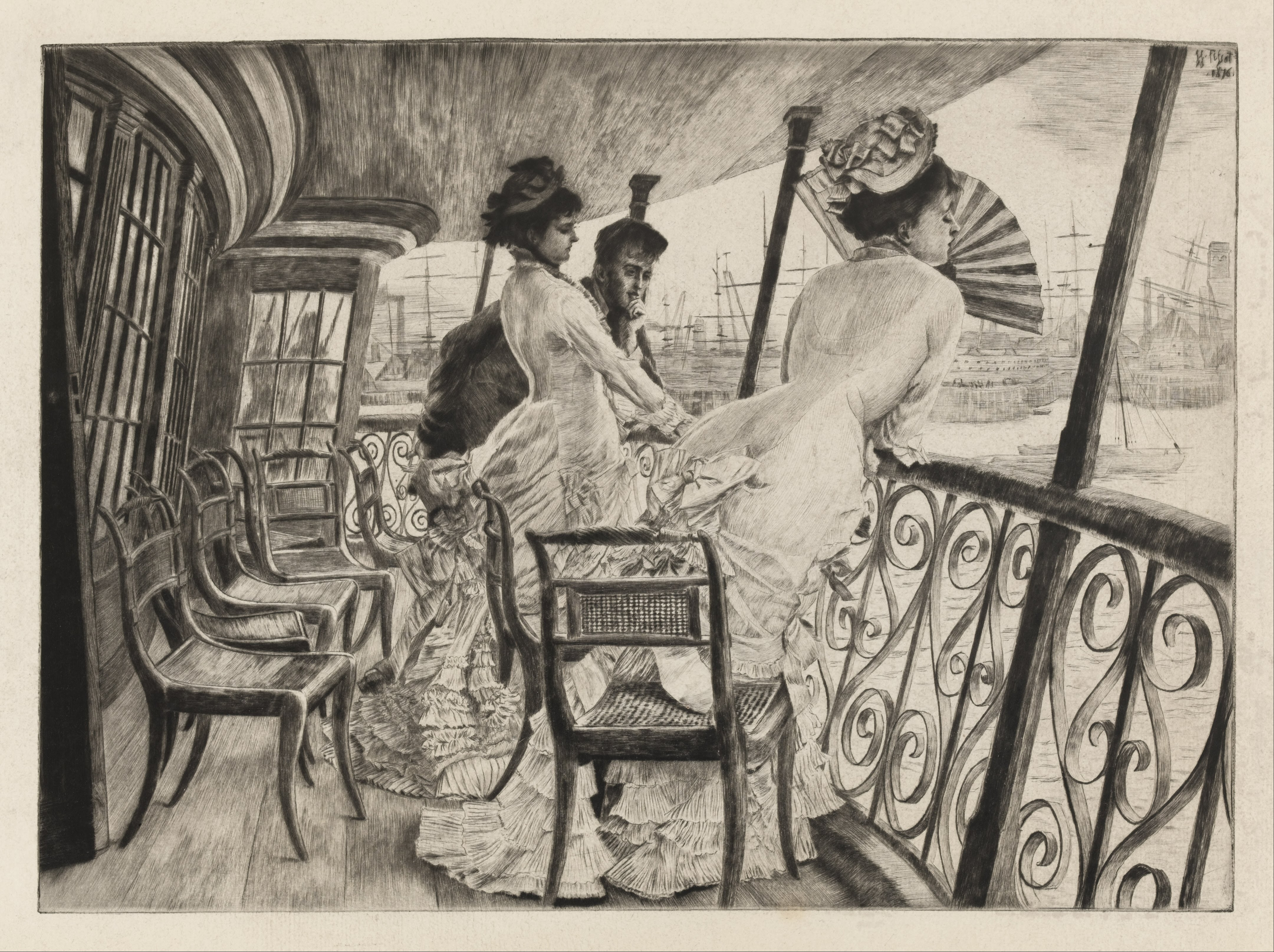
Drypoint, reproduced as an etching, Souvenir of a Ball on Shipboard, 1876

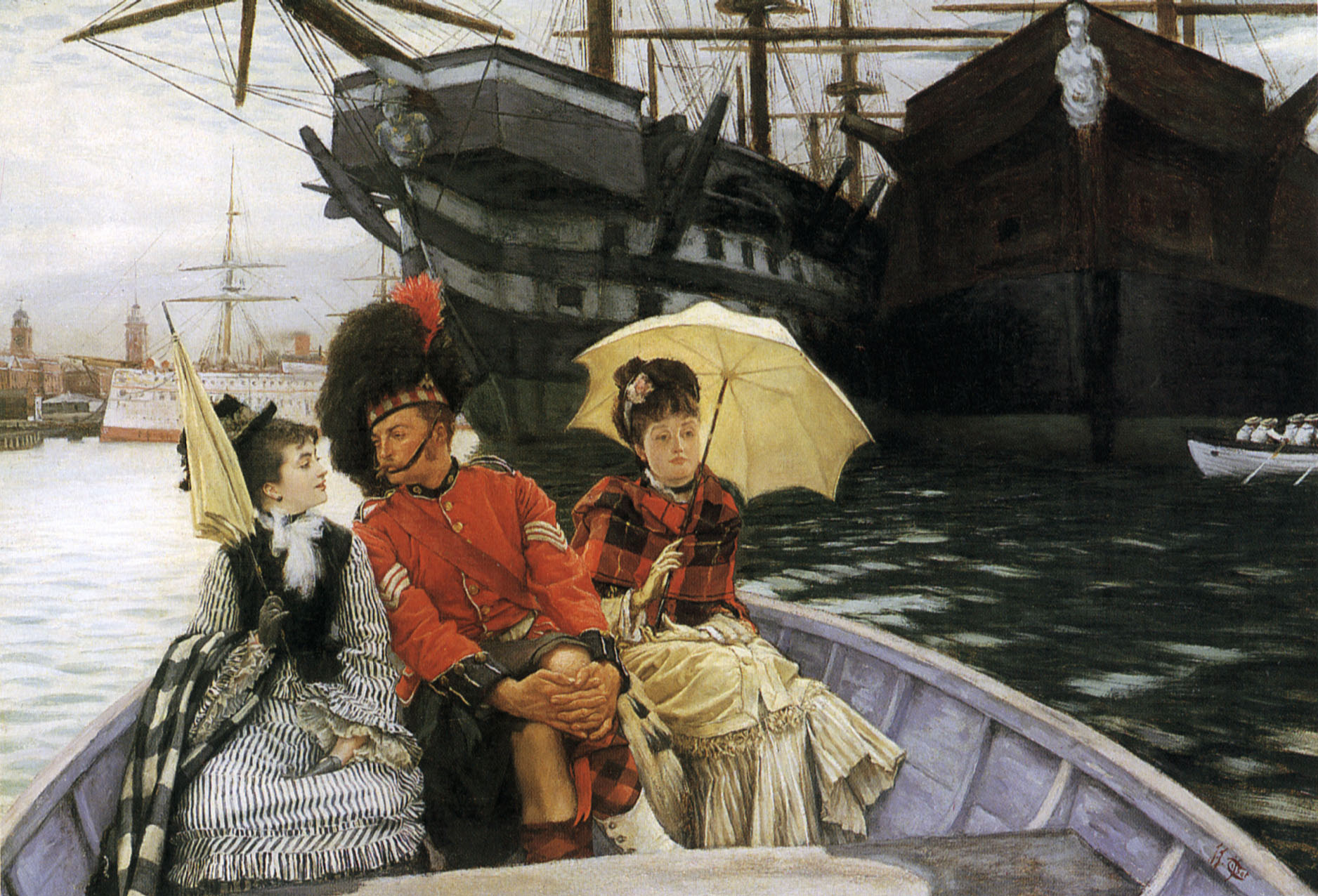
Portsmouth Dockyard,1877
