= The Fur Jacket =

Painting by James McNeill Whistler

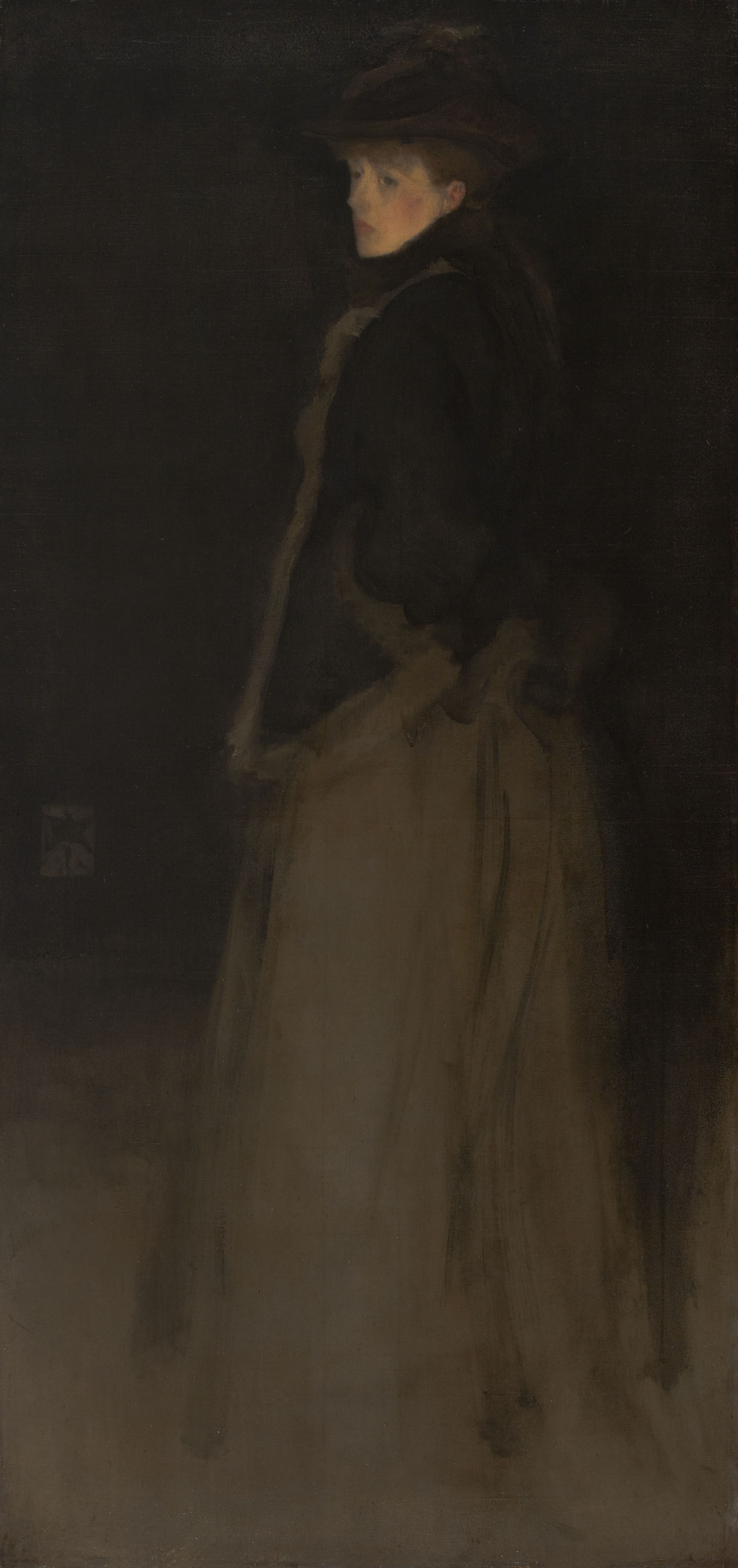
- Artist: James McNeill Whistler
- Year: 1877
- Type: Oil on canvas,portrait painting
- Dimensions: 193 cm × 92.6 cm (76 in × 36.5 in)
- Location: Worcester Art Museum, Massachusetts

Arrangement in Black and Brown: The Fur Jacket is an 1877 oil painting by the Anglo-American artist James McNeill Whistler. The American-born Whistler settled in London and began painting works that were increasingly experimental and abstract. This picture depicts his frequent model Maud Franklin dressed in outdoor clothes. It pays homage to the Old Master Diego Velázquez. When Whistler sued John Ruskin over a negative review at the Grosvenor Gallery Exhibition of 1877, this was one of the paintings produced in court to be discussed. The fallout of the trial left Whistler isolated from even the Aesthetic Movement as a complete artistic maverick.

As with much of his work, the focus is less about the sitter as the contrasts of colours which he likened to musical movements. Today the picture is in the collection of Worcester Art Museum in Massachusetts, which acquired it in 1910.

== See also ==
- List of paintings by James McNeill Whistler

== Bibliography ==
- Jacobi, Carol (ed.) James McNeill Whistler. Tate Publishing, 2026.
- Merrill, Linda. After Whistler: The Artist and His Influence on American Painting. Yale University Press, 2003.
- Sutherland, Daniel E. Whistler: A Life for Art's Sake. Yale University Press, 2014.
