= Grosvenor Gallery Exhibition of 1877 =

1877 art exhibition in London

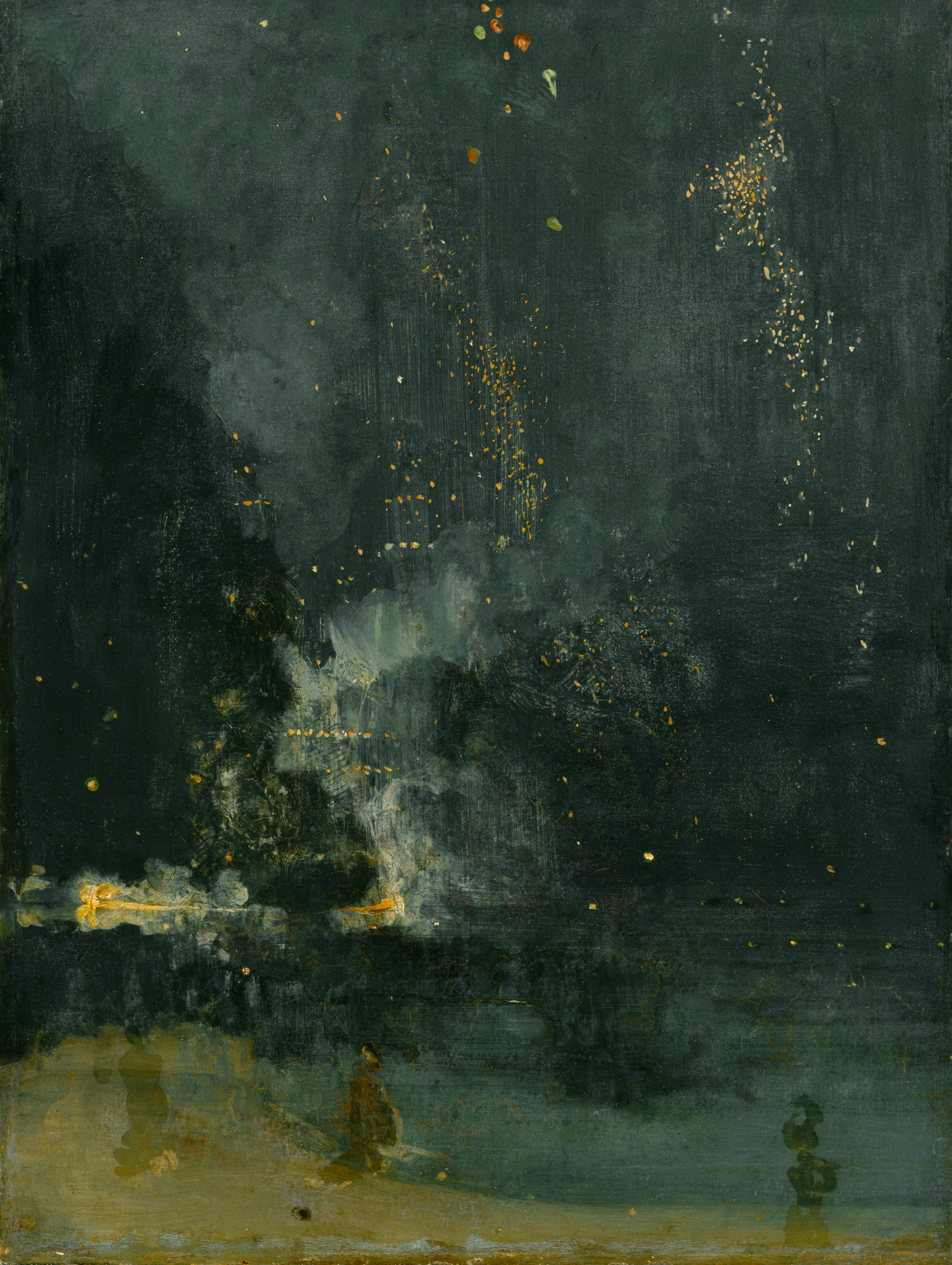
Nocturne in Black and Gold – The Falling Rocket by James McNeill Whistler

The Grosvenor Gallery Exhibition of 1877 was the inaugural art exhibition held by the Grosvenor Gallery in New Bond Street in London, running from 1 May to early August 1877.

It was launched by Sir Coutts Lindsay and his wife Caroline Blanche, who had paid much of the large cost of constructing the new Grosvenor Galley. By staging a major show of contemporary work they effctively put it into direct competition with the annual Summer Exhibition of the Royal Academy held at Burlington House. The Prince of Wales, the future Edward VII was present at the banquet which preceded the exhibition.

== Exhibitors ==
The staging of Grosvenor exhibition marked a major shift in layout. While at the Royal Academy a large number of works were hung in the Salon-style stacked up the walls on top of each other, the Grosvenor spaced them out. This was possible by having a more select number of participants with 209 works on display. Sixty four artists were invited to exhibit and signicantly each individuals work was shown together rather than being split up as was usual at exhibitions.

The participants were drawn particularly from he Pre-Raphaelite and Aestheticism movements. Despite the perceived rivalry between the two organisations, a number of prominent members of the Royal Academy submitted work to the Grosvenor. This included Frederic Leighton who the following year would be elected President of the Royal Academy, who exhibited two pictures. John Everett Millais sent in several portrait paintings as well as a genre work Stitch, Stitch, Stitch, a portrayal of a young seamstress.

A major beneficiary from the exhibition wss a younger Pre-Raphaelite Edward Burne-Jones. The positive reception of his pictures transformed him into a celebrity artist. Amongst other painters represented were Louise Jopling, Edward Poynter, James Tissot, Albert Joseph Moore, George Frederic Watts and Lawrence Alma-Tadema.

== Whistler libel trial ==
The exhibition sparked a famous libel trial when the art critic John Ruskin gave a negative review to James McNeill Whistler, the American-born pioneer of Tonalism. Whistler had submitted eight paintings to the Grosvenor four portraits and four Nocturnes. These night views of the River Thames showed hazy atmosphere using thin paint.

Ruskin was critical of the lack of finish in these paintings and regarding one of them Nocturne in Black and Gold – The Falling Rocket accused Whistler of asking "two hundred guineas for flinging a pot of paint in the public's face". Ruskin was not the only negative voice, the writer Henry James was dismissive of these "experiments".

Whistler sued Ruskin and the case was heard at the Queen's Bench of the High Court in November 1878. Burne-Jones and William Powell Frith were summoned as expert witnesses. While Whistler won a limited victory, and was awarded the tiny sum of a farthing, the trial was initially disastrous to both his finances and his artisitic reputation.

The inaugural exhibition was considered to be a general success, and a second edition the Grosvenor Gallery Exhibition of 1878 was held the following year.The Grosvenor Gallery continued to hold annual exhibitions until 1890, although it's later years were marked by a falling out amongst its backers and was largely supllanted by the New Gallery in Regent Street.

== Gallery ==
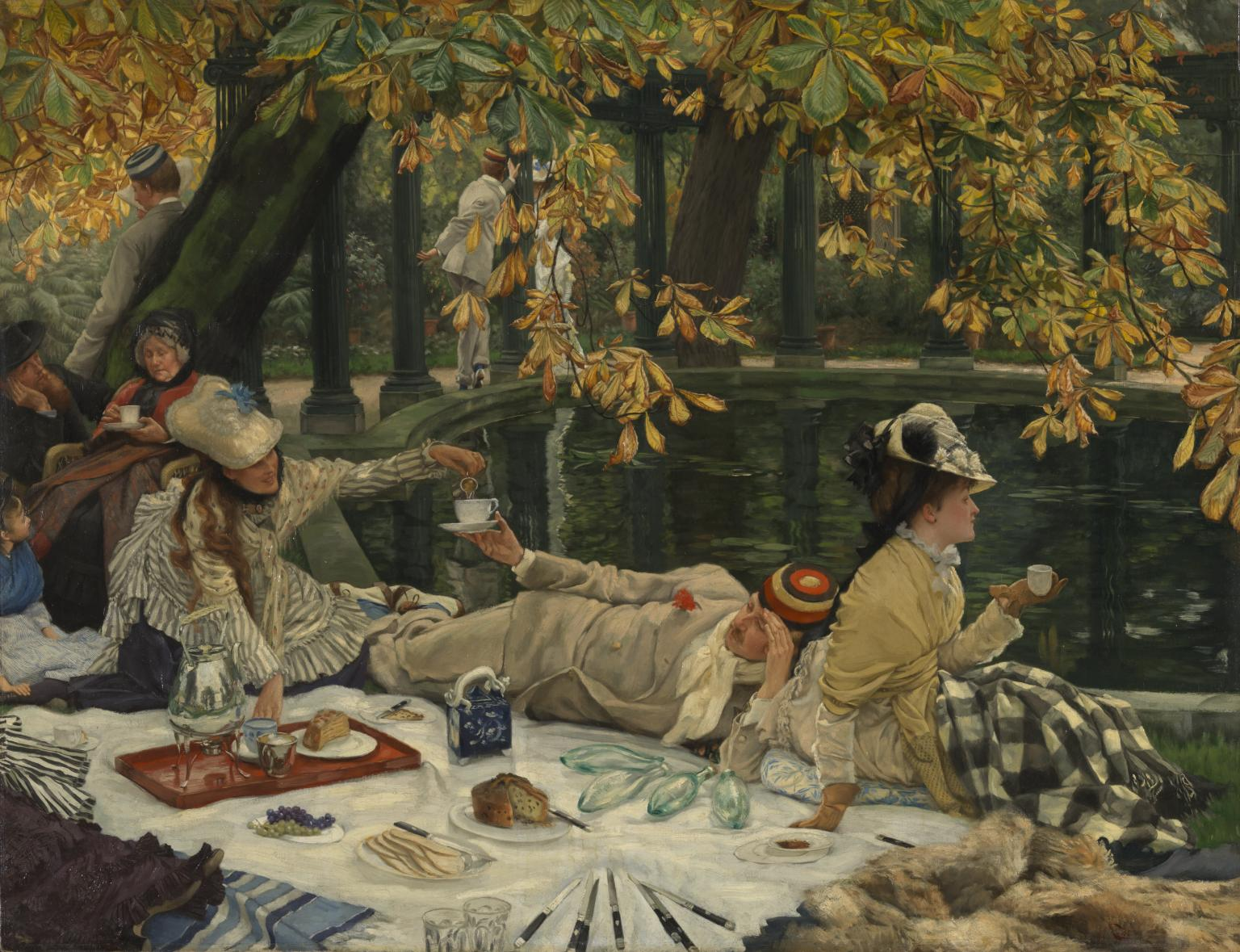
Holyday by James Tissot

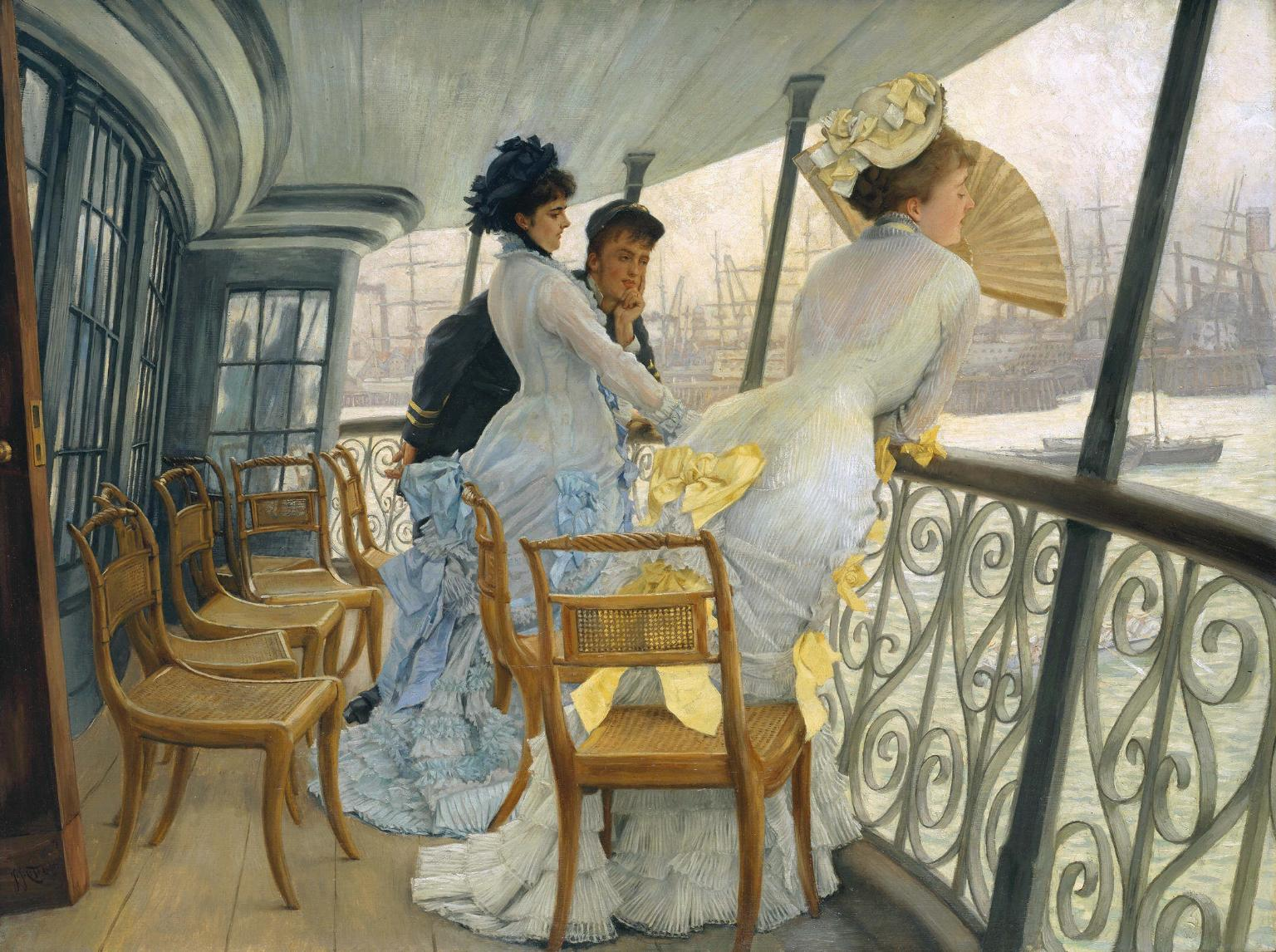
The Gallery of H.M.S. Calcutta by James Tissot

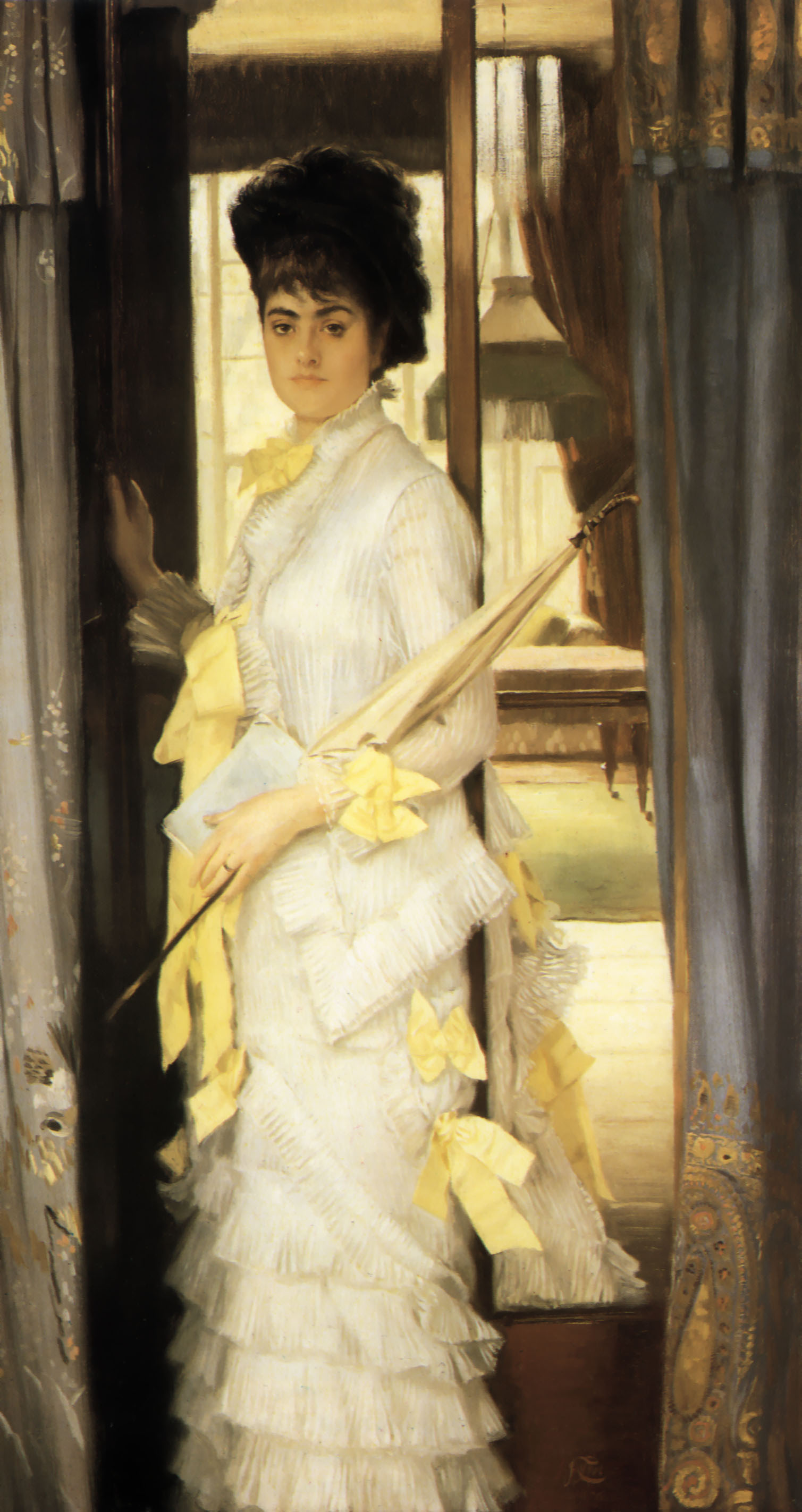
Summer by James Tissot

The Triumph of Will by James Tissot

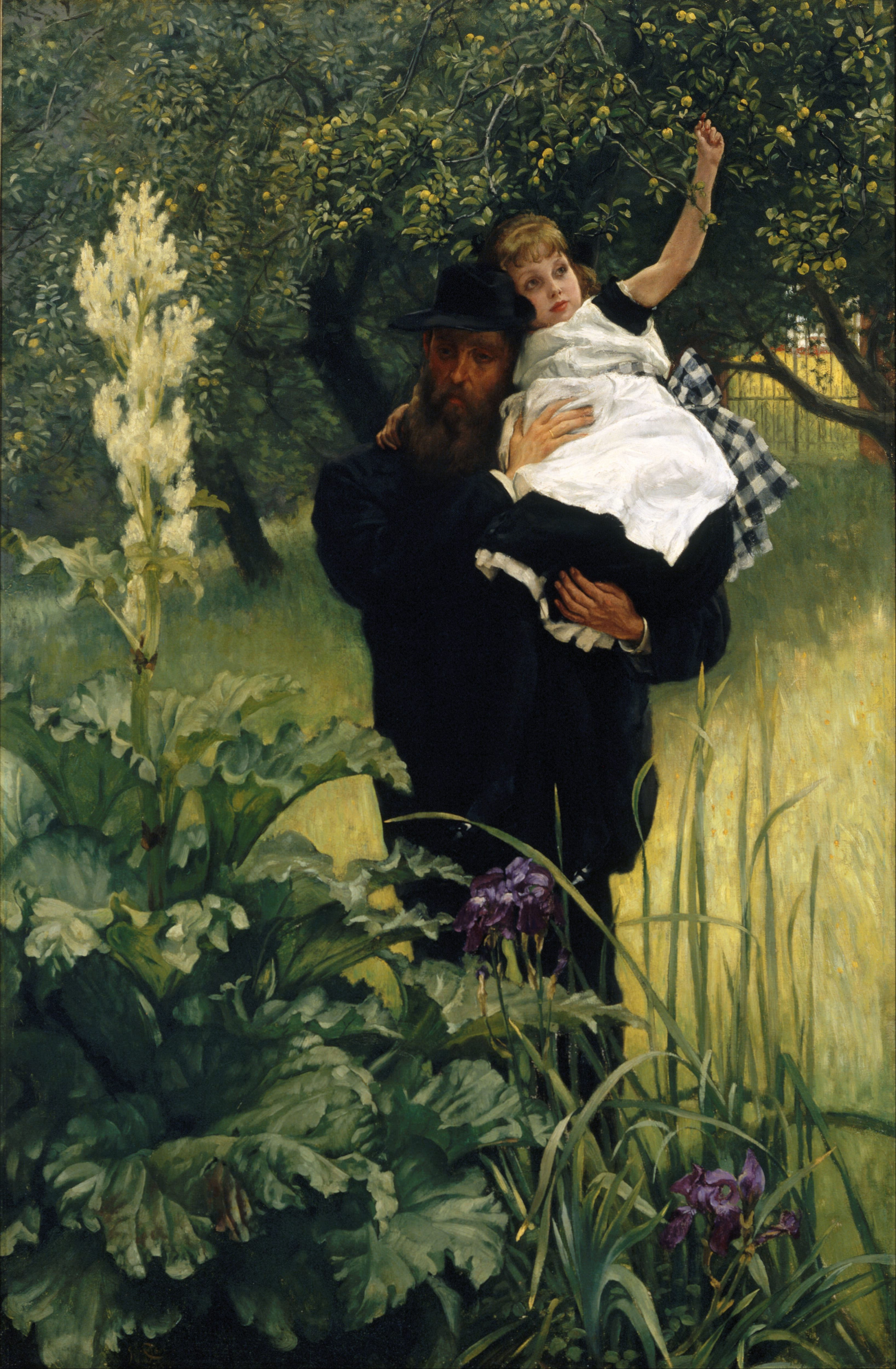
The Widower by James Tissot

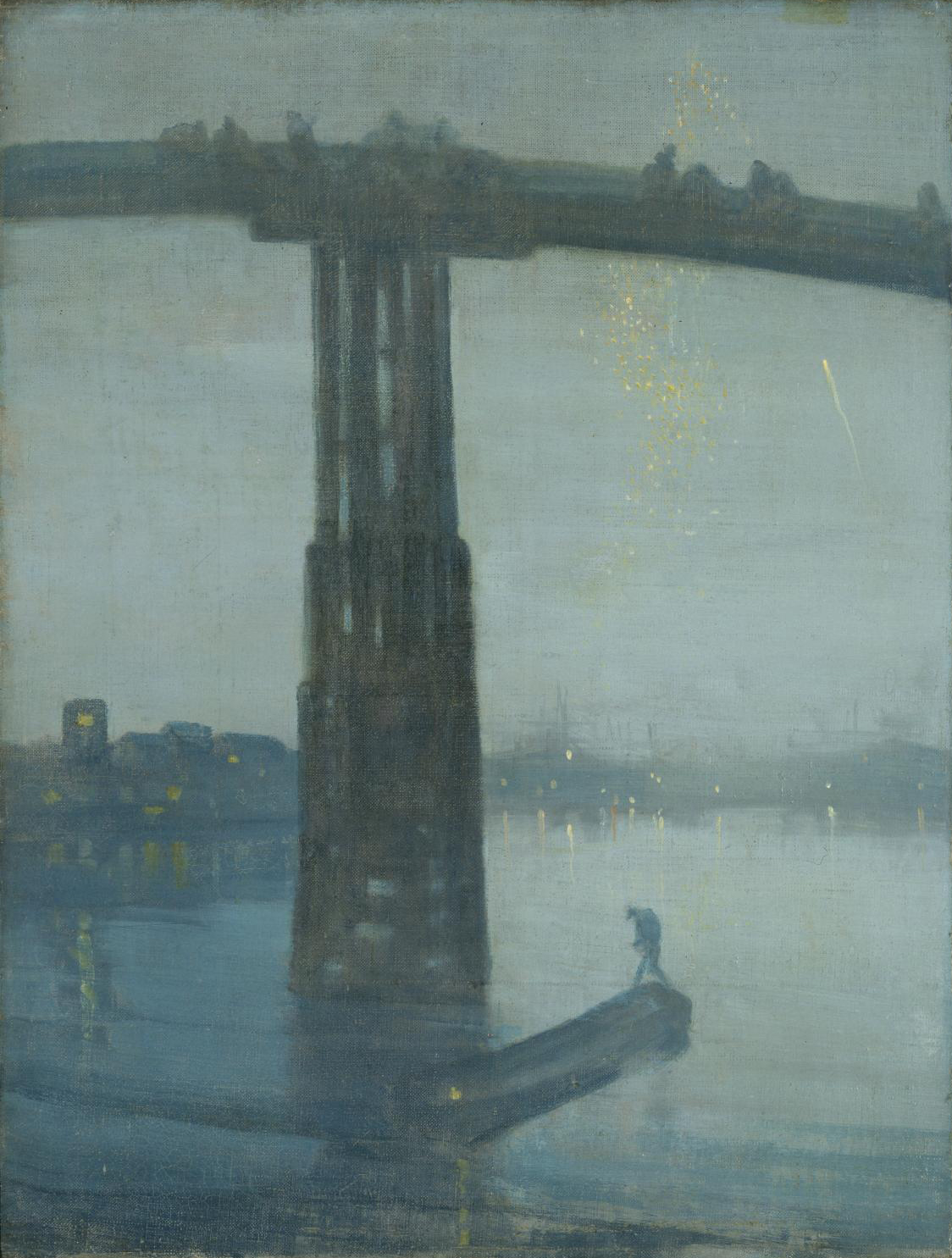
Old Battersea Bridge by James McNeill Whistler

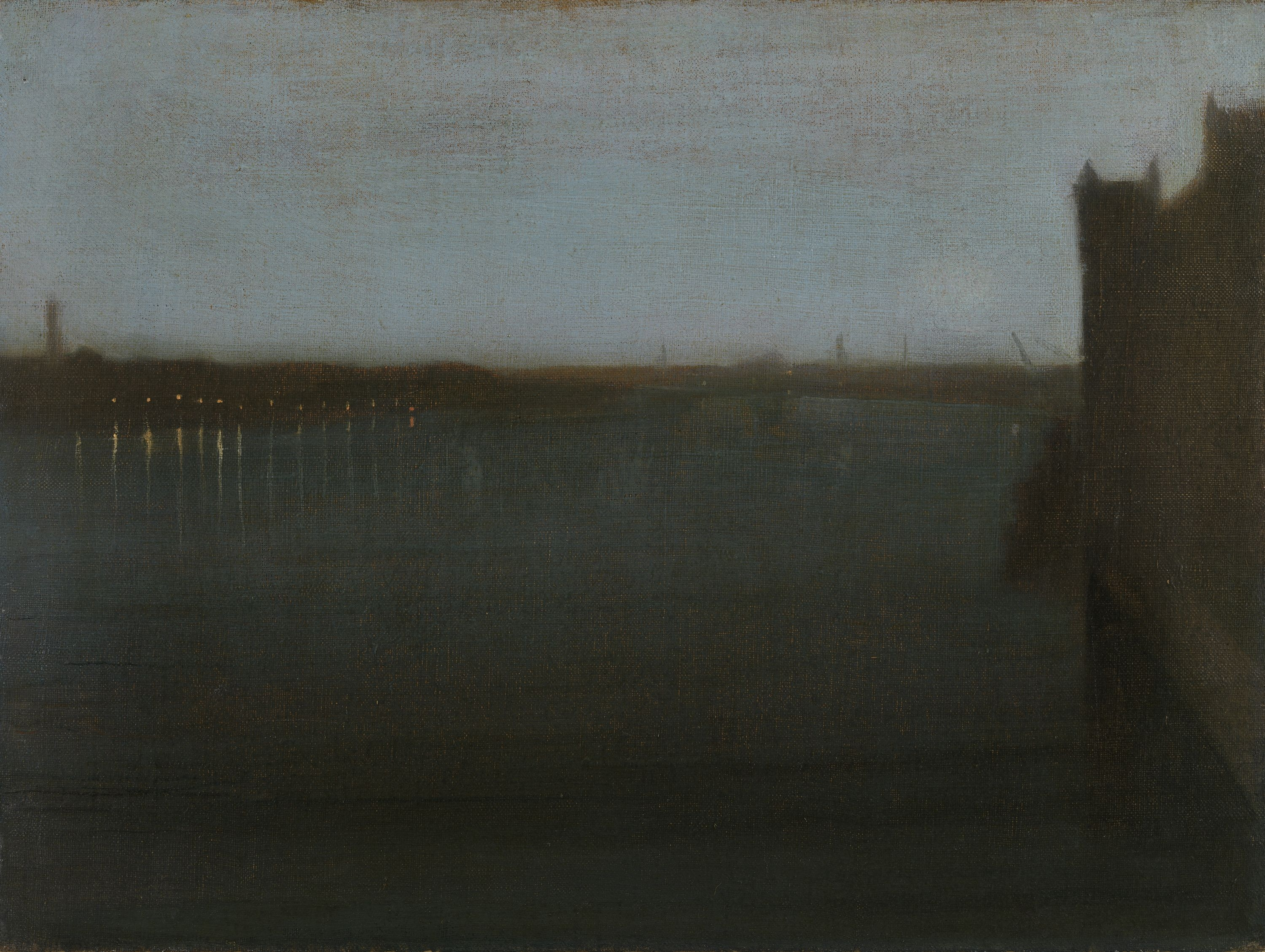
Westminster Bridge by James McNeill Whistler

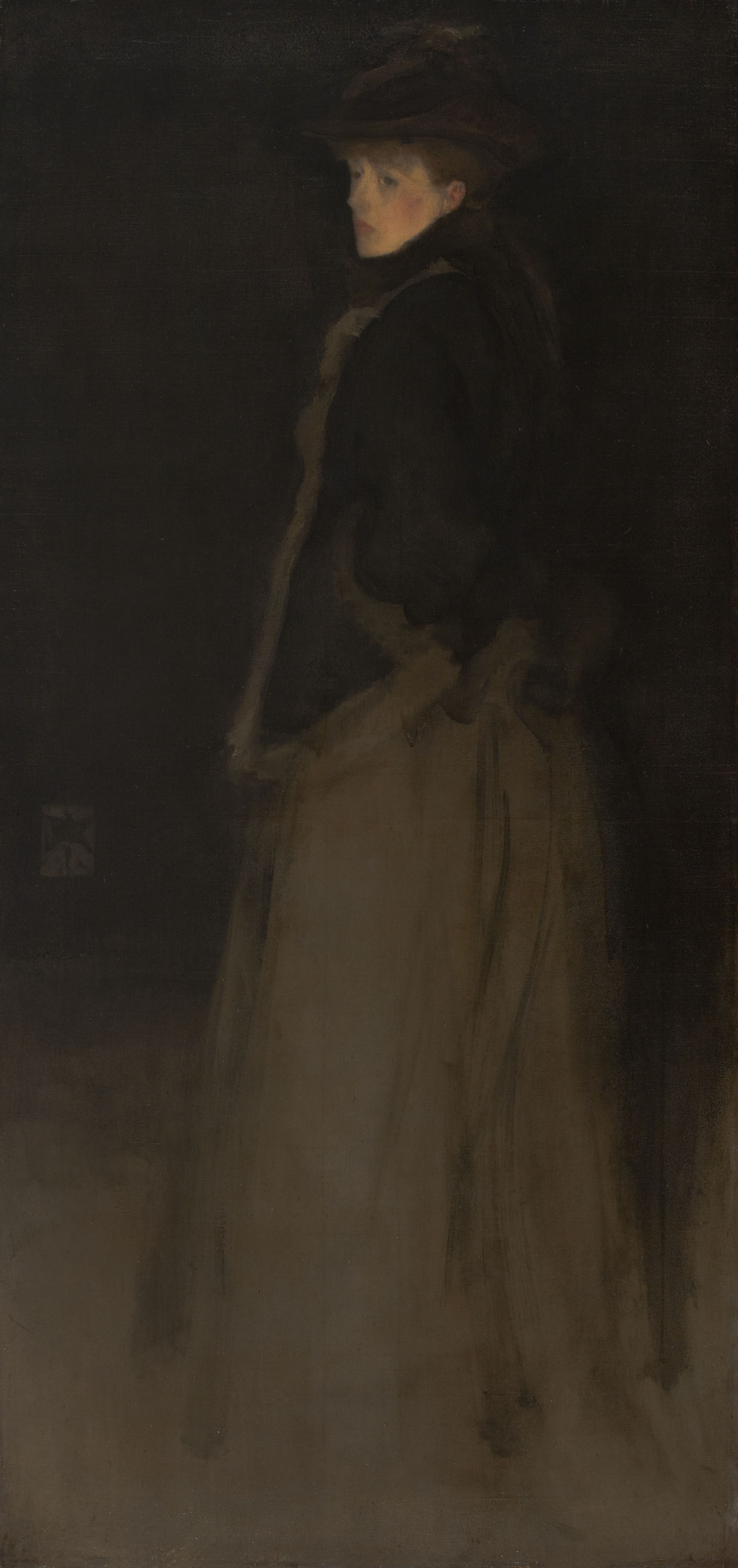
The Fur Jacket by James McNeill Whistler

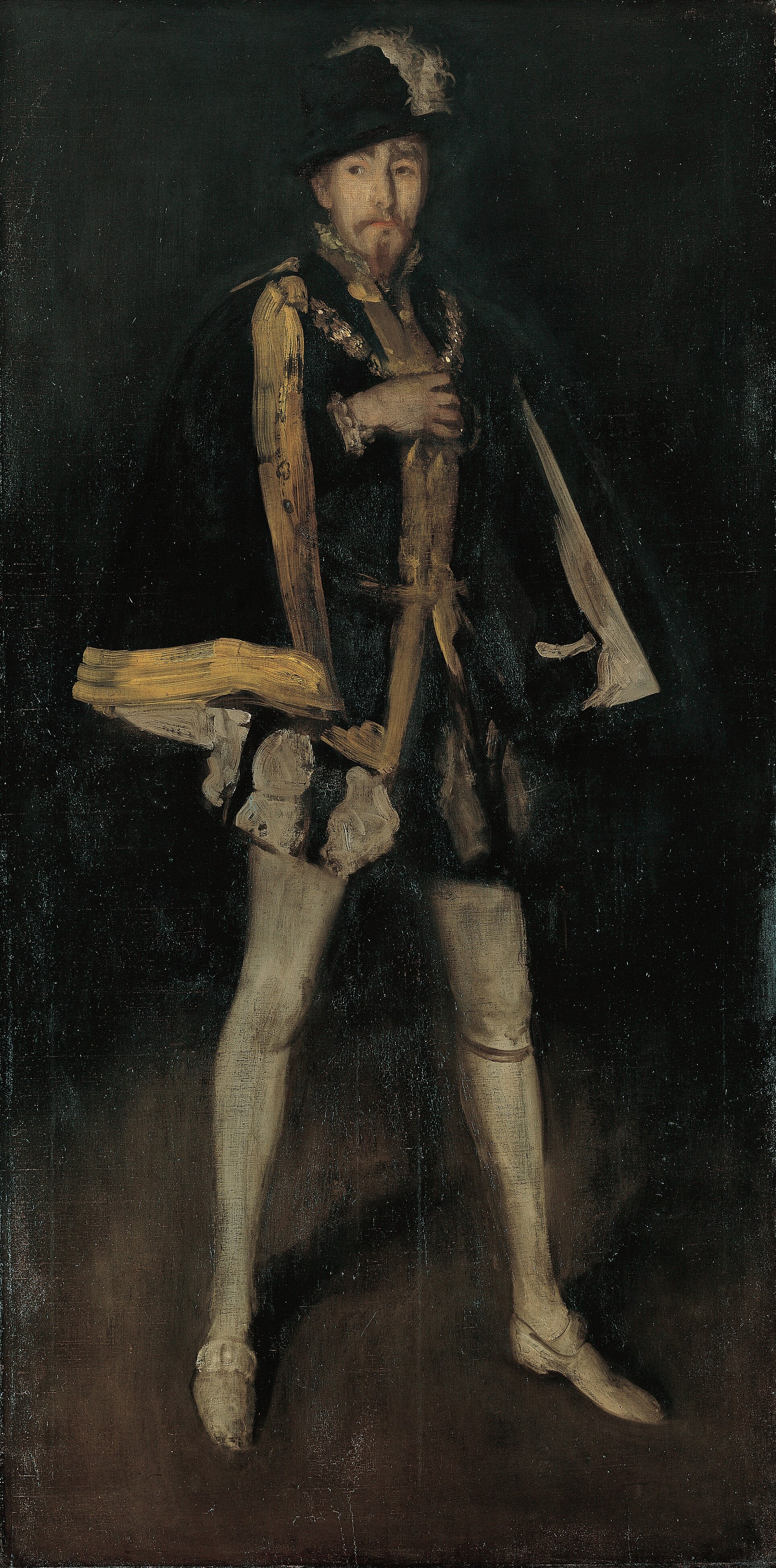
Henry Irving as Philip II of Spain by James McNeill Whistler

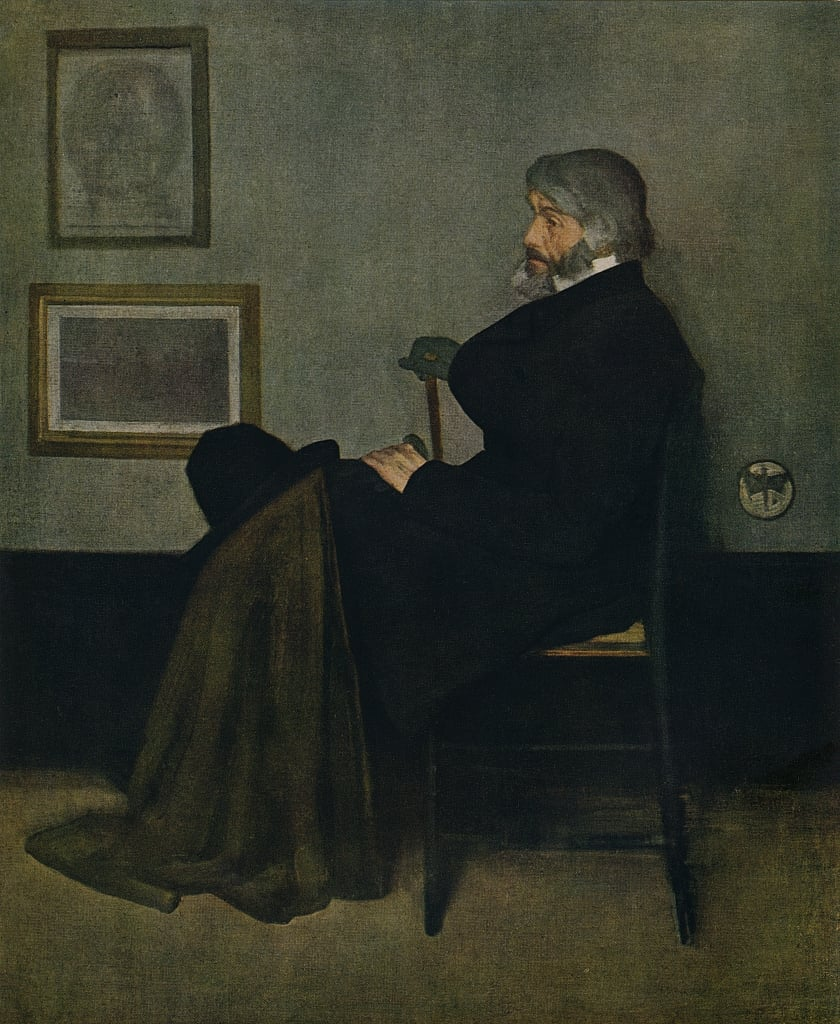
Portrait of Thomas Carlyle by James McNeill Whistler

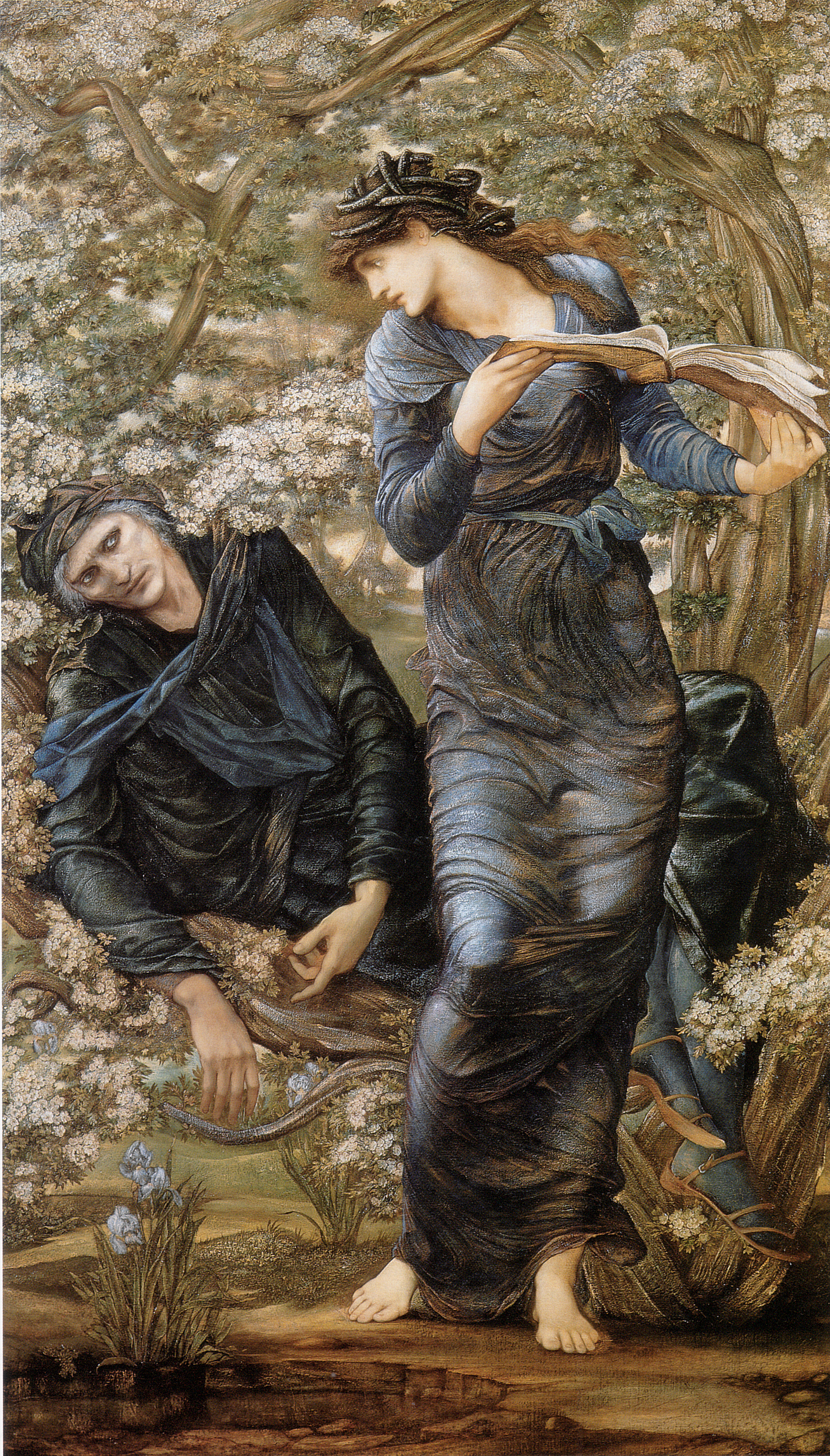
The Beguiling of Merlin by Edward Burne-Jones

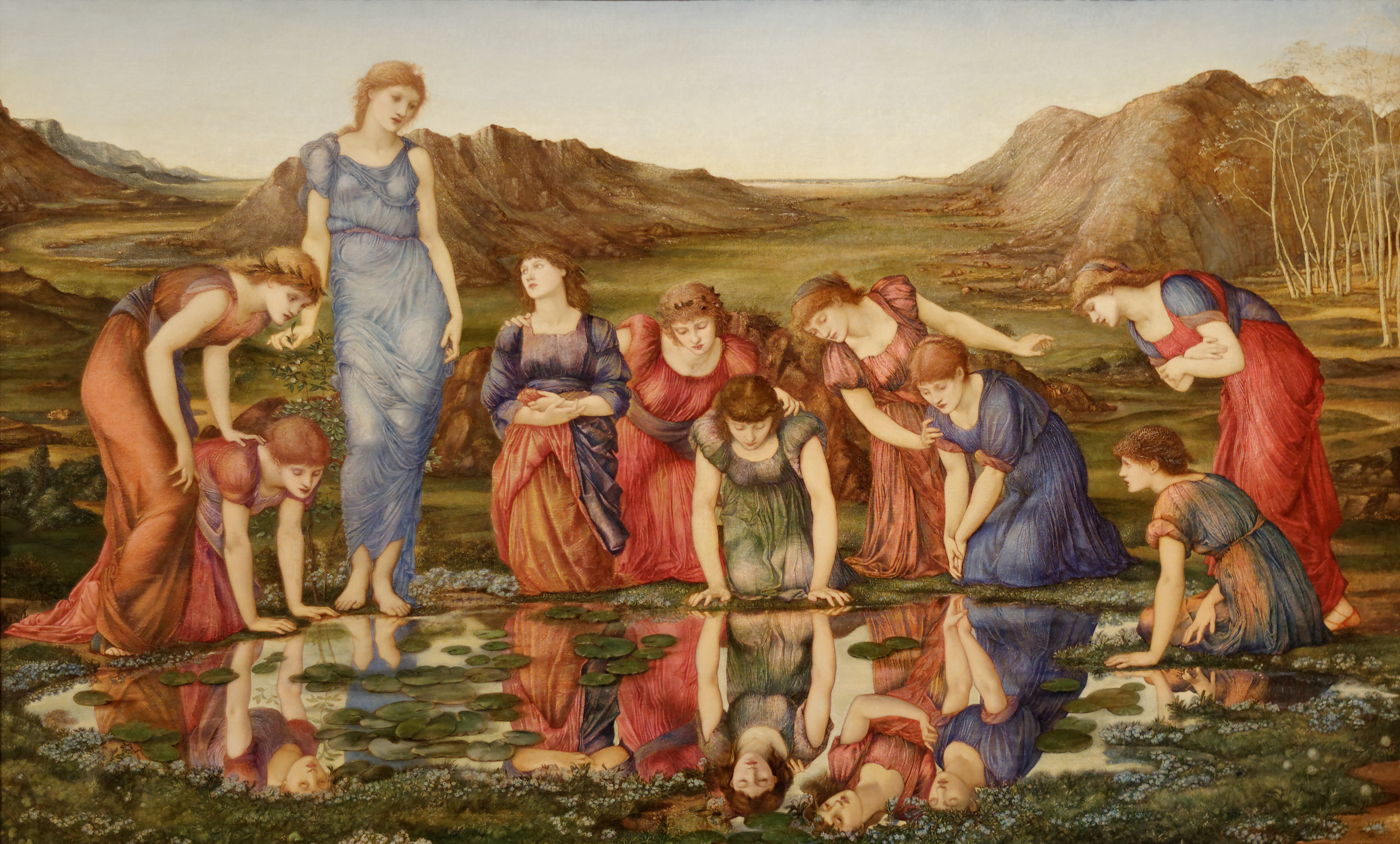
The Mirror of Venus by Edward Burne-Jones

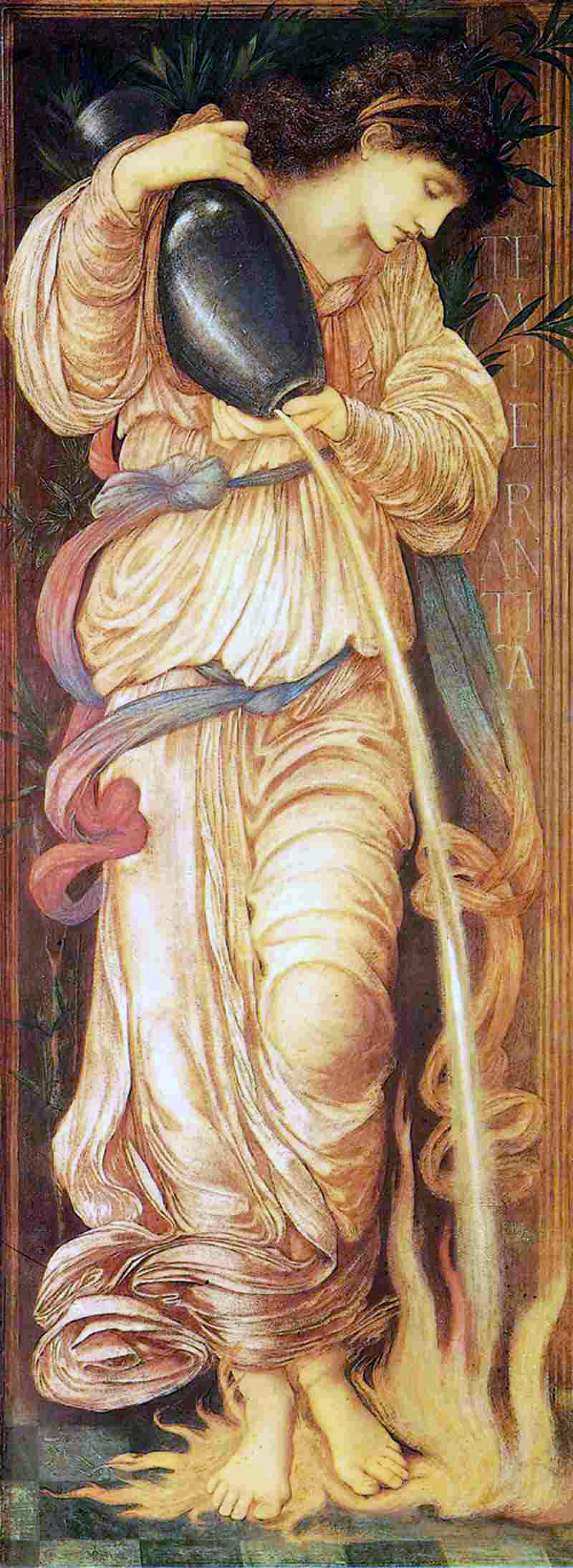
Temperantia by Edward Burne-Jones

It Might Have Been by Louise Jopling

The Afterglow in Egypt by William Holman Hunt

An Italian Girl by William Holman Hunt

The Plains of Esdraelon by William Holman Hunt

The Tinker by Alphonse Legros

Sunday Morning by Lawrence Alma-Tadema

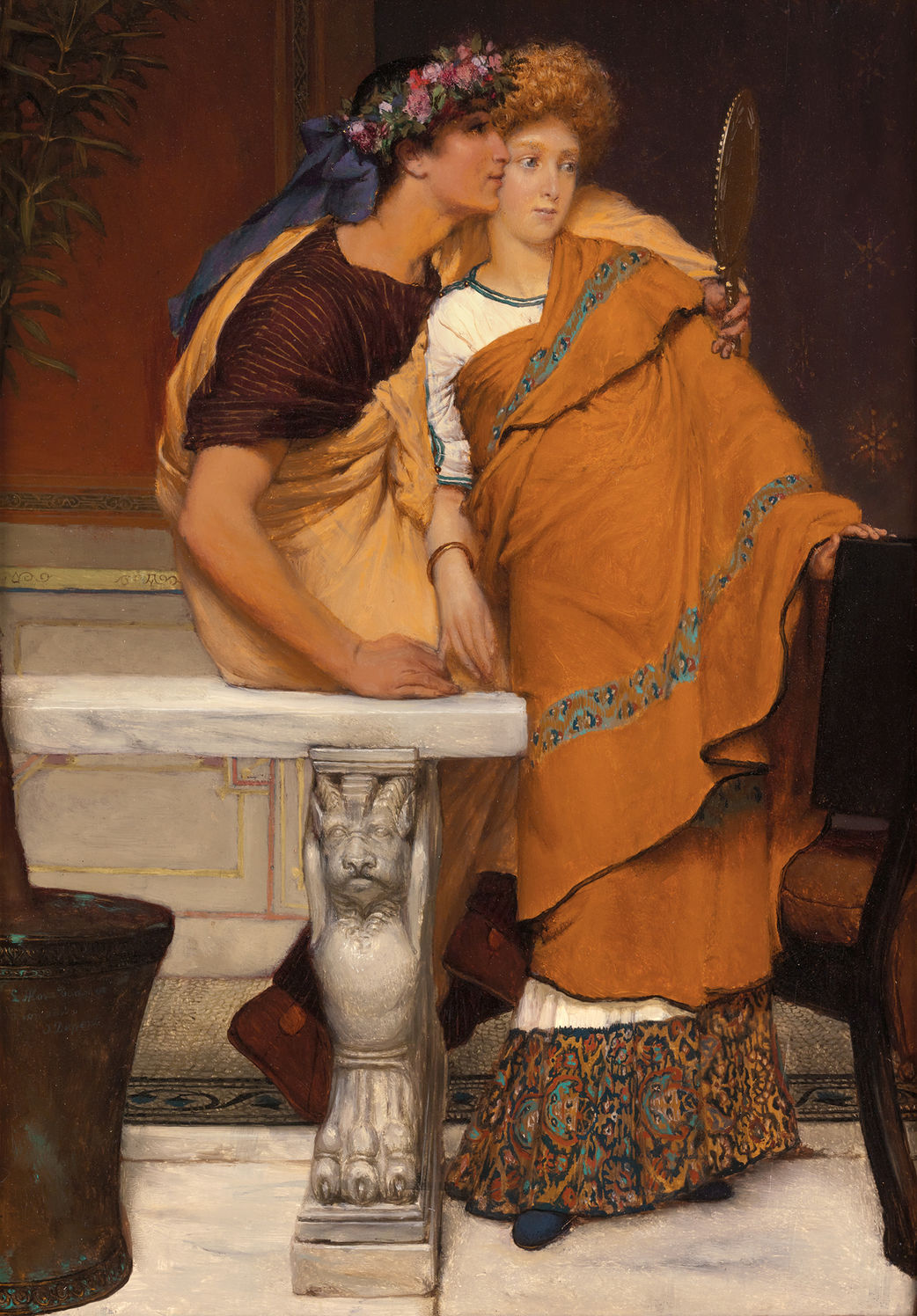
The Mirror by Lawrence Alma-Tadema

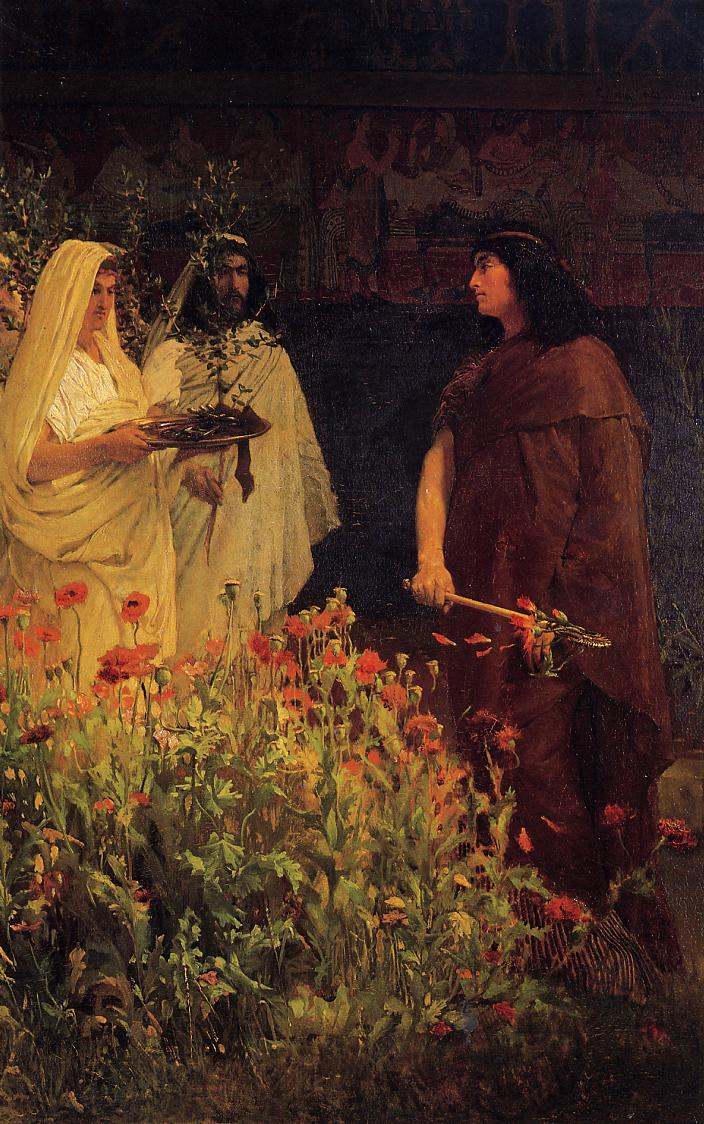
Tarquinius Superbus by Lawrence Alma-Tadema

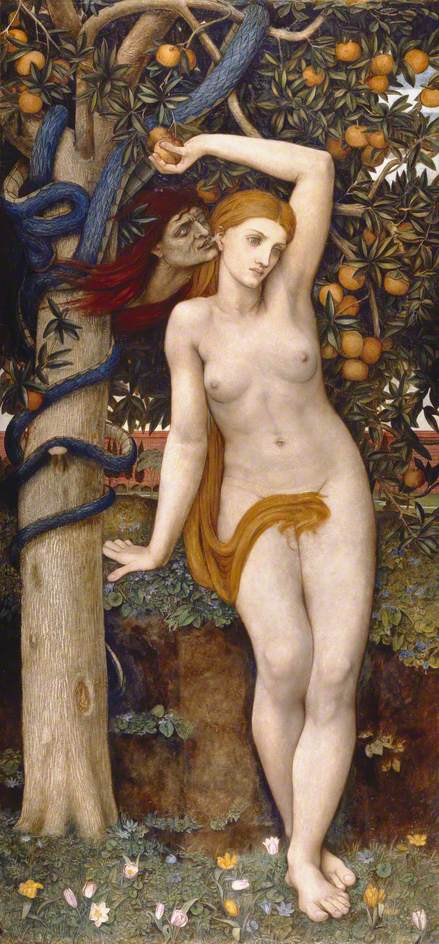
Eve Tempted by John Roddam Spencer Stanhope

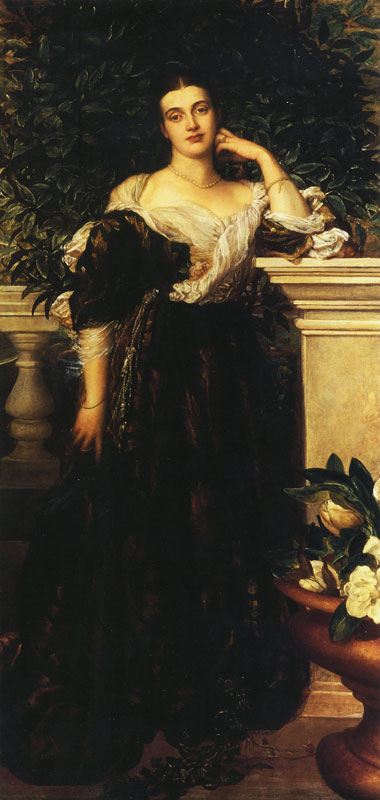
Portrait of Madeline Wyndham by George Frederic Watts

Love and Death by George Frederic Watts

Marigolds by Albert Joseph Moore

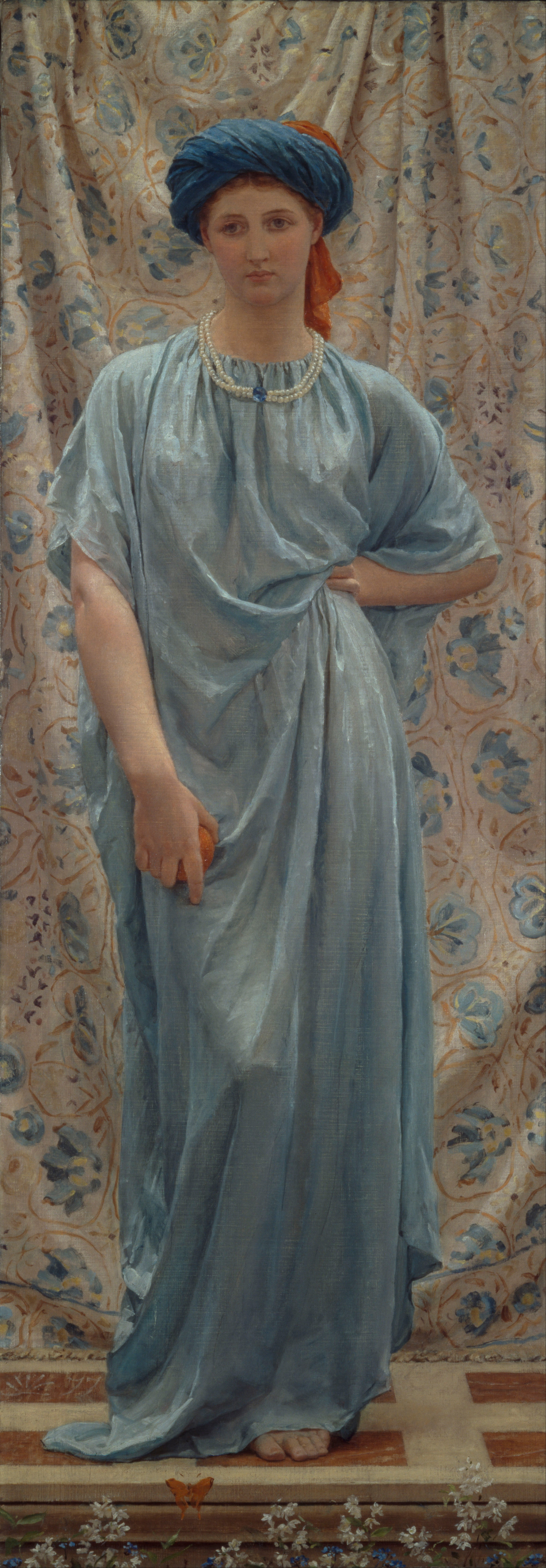
Sapphires by Albert Joseph Moore

The End of the Story by Albert Joseph Moore

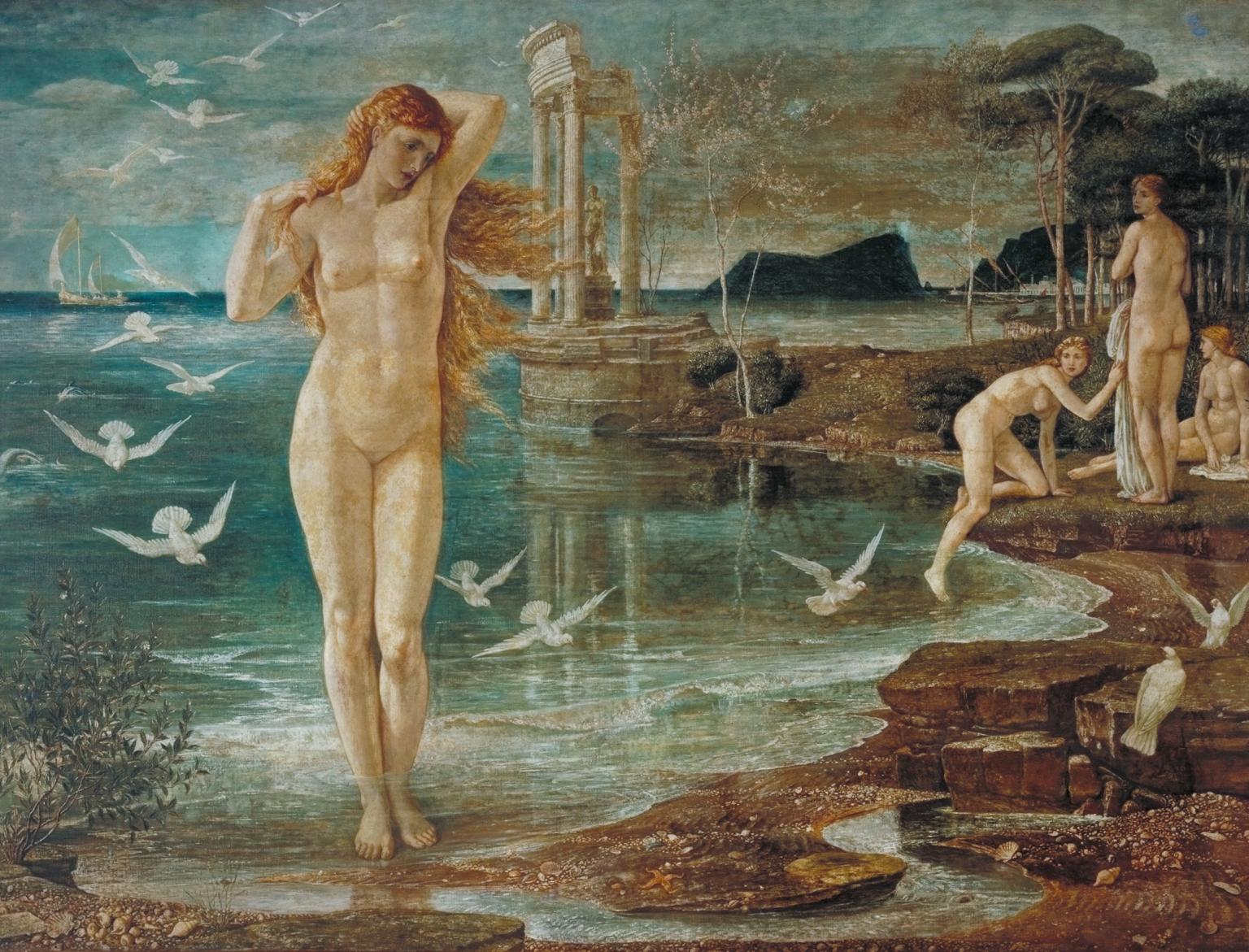
The Renaissance of Venus by Walter Crane

== See also ==
- Royal Academy Exhibition of 1877, held at Burlington House
- Salon of 1877, held in Paris

== Bibliography ==
- Blackburn, Henry. Grosvenor Notes, 1877-1882: Containing Complete Catalogues of the Summer Exhibitions at the Grosvenor Gallery Chatto & Windus, 1882.
- Chang, Heesok, Demaria, Robert & Zacher, Samantha (ed.) A Companion to British Literature, Volume 4: Victorian and Twentieth-Century Literature, 1837 - 2000. Wiley, 2013.
- Denney, Colleen. At the Temple of Art: The Grosvenor Gallery, 1877-1890 . Fairleigh Dickinson University Press, 2000.
- Koval, Anne. Whistler in His Time. Tate Gallery, 1994.
- MacCarthy, Fiona. The Last Pre-Raphaelite: Edward Burne-Jones and the Victorian Imagination. Harvard University Press, 2012.
- Murphy, Paul Thomas. Falling Rocket: James Whistler, John Ruskin, and the Battle for Modern Art, Simon & Schuster, 2023.
- Sutherland, Daniel E. Whistler: A Life for Art's Sake. Yale University Press, 2014.
