= Portsmouth Dockyard (Tissot) =

Painting by James Tissot

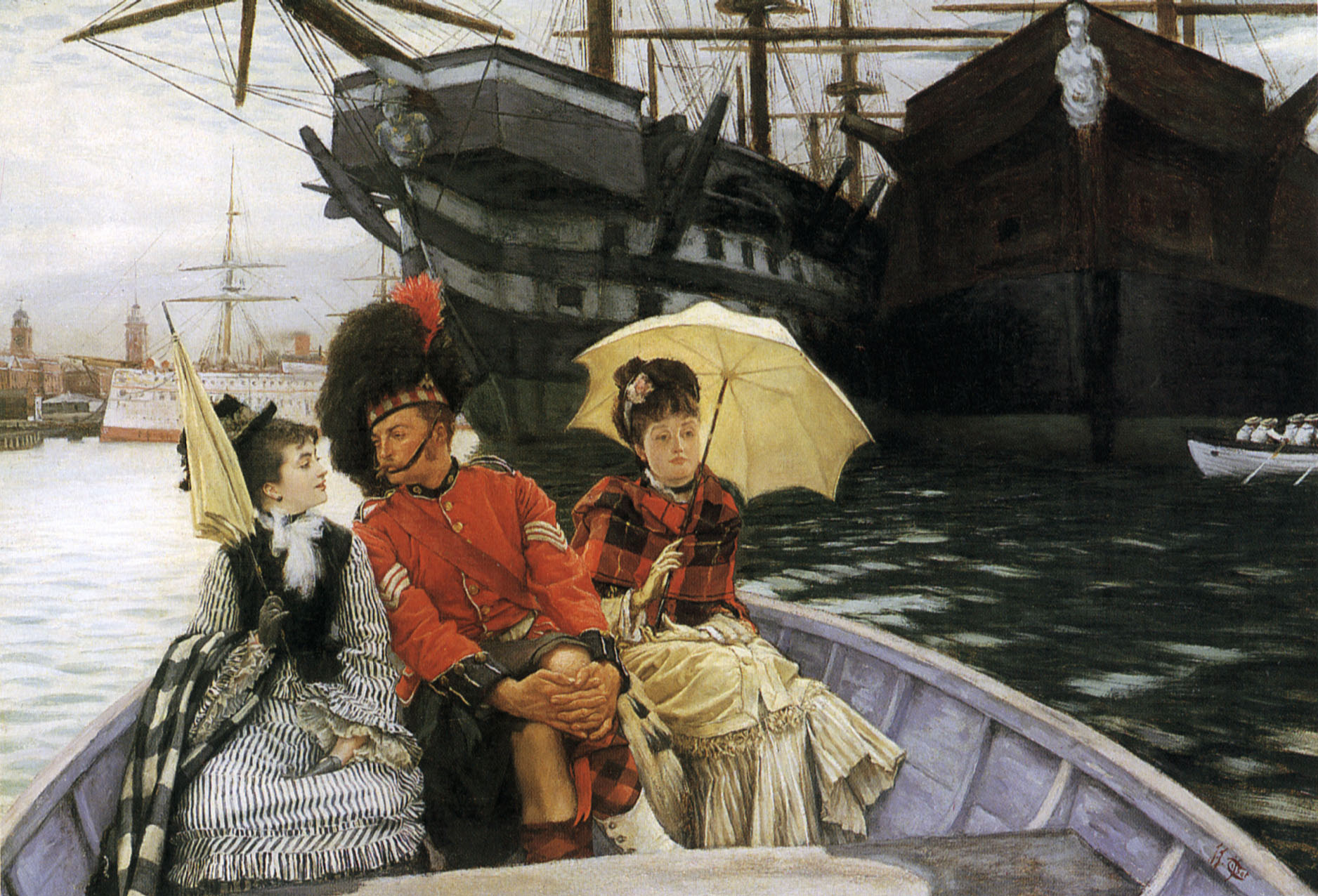
- Artist: James Tissot
- Year: 1877
- Type: Oil on canvas
- Dimensions: 38.1 cm × 54.6 cm (15.0 in × 21.5 in)
- Location: Tate Britain, London

Portsmouth Dockyard is an oil painting on canvas by French artist James Tissot, from 1877. It is a reworking of his 1876 painting On The Thames, which also depicts a man and two women in a boat.

== History and description ==
The painting depicts three people sitting in a rowing boat among the towering naval vessels in Portsmouth Dockyard, with another rowing boat crewed by naval personnel passing in the background before the bows of two old-fashioned square rigged ships of the line. In the background is a modern ironclad warship. In the centre is a man wearing the uniform of a sergeant in a Highland Regiment, with redcoat, kilt, and feather bonnet. He sits with his legs crossed, and his hands clasped around one bare knee. He is turning away from the unhappy woman to his left - in cream dress and tartan shawl or blanket, and her parasol up - and towards the smiling woman to his right - in white and black striped dress, with shawl over her arm and parasol furled.

This 1877 painting is a reworking of Tissot's 1876 painting On The Thames, which depicts a man and two women reclining lazily aboard a boat moving through crowded shipping on the River Thames. On The Thames was shown at the Royal Academy in 1876 but it was poorly received, with critics questioning the sexual morality of the subjects: one critic described it as "wilfully vulgar", and another disparagingly as "more French than English". Tissot's less ambiguous 1877 reworking of the subject in Portsmouth Dockyard was more favourably received, but the story remains unclear. Perhaps there is some flirtation between the man and the woman to the left; perhaps the second woman a chaperone, or a sister.

The painting was exhibited at the Grosvenor Gallery in 1877 under the title Portsmouth Dockyard. The same year, Tissot made a drypoint copy of the painting, which was reproduced as an etching in two editions of around 100 prints each, measuring 9.75 by 13.75 inches (248 mm × 349 mm), under the French title Entre les Deux mon Coeur balance (literally, "Between the two my heart swings"; sometimes translated as "How happy I could be with either"). An etching of the drypoint reproduction was sold at Sotheby's in 2013 for £1,125, described as a work on "the theme of comic rivalry in the affairs of the heart", and one was sold at Bonhams in 2018 for $937.

The painting was bought by the Lancashire corn merchant Henry Jump, and descended through his family. It was sold at Christie's in 1937 under the title Divided Attention, bought by Leicester Galleries for 58 guineas, and exhibited at Leicester Galleries under the title Entre les Deux mon Coeur balance (the title of Tissot's drypoint and etching of the same subject). The painting was sold to Sir Hugh Walpole, who left it to the Tate Gallery on his death in 1941. The Tate first exhibited it in 1942 under the title How happy could he be with either, later returning to the original title Portsmouth Dockyard. It remains in the collection of the Tate.

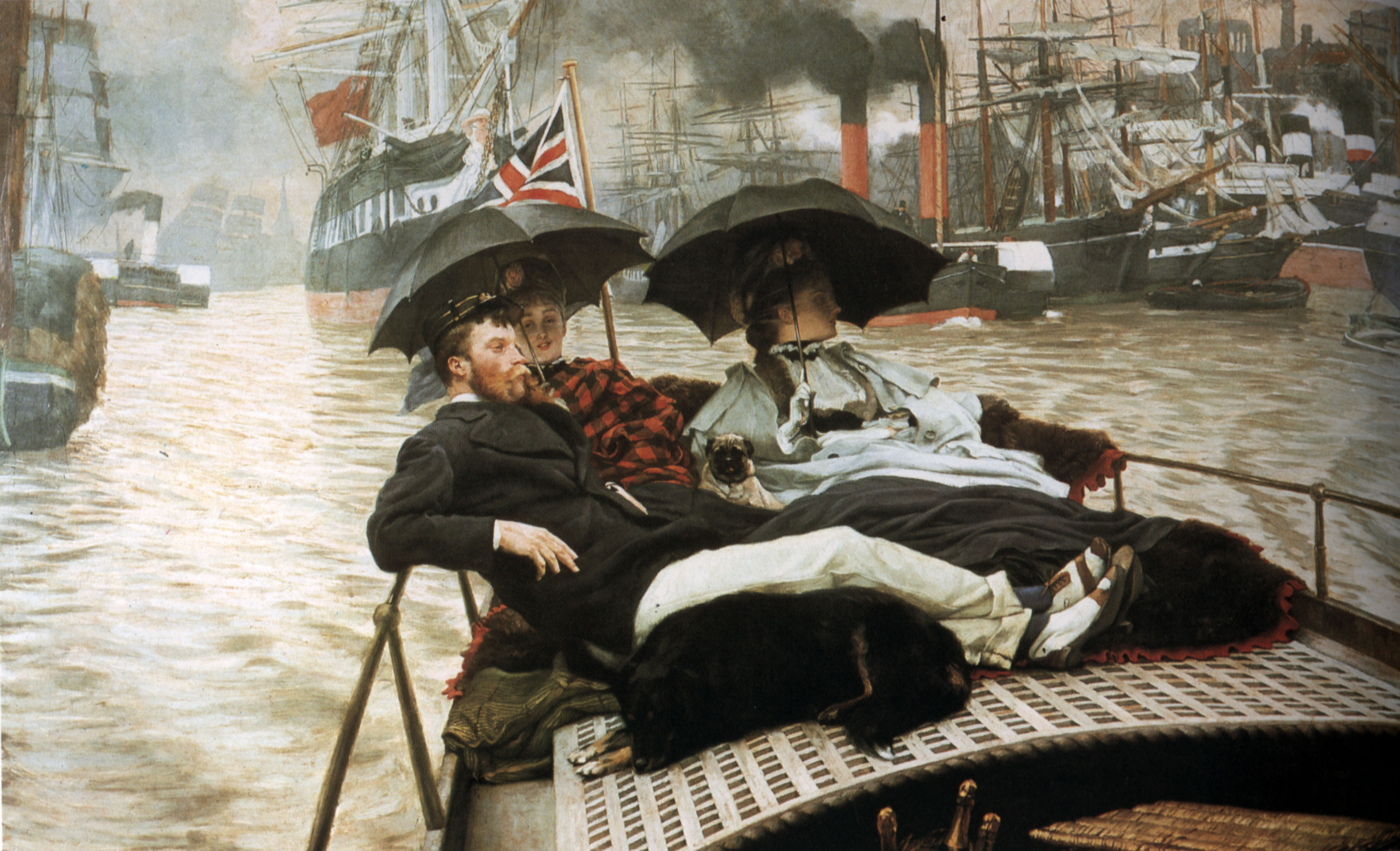
James Tissot, On the Thames (How Happy I Could Be with Either?), 1876, The Hepworth Wakefield
