= Hearts of Oak (painting) =

Painting by James Clarke Hook

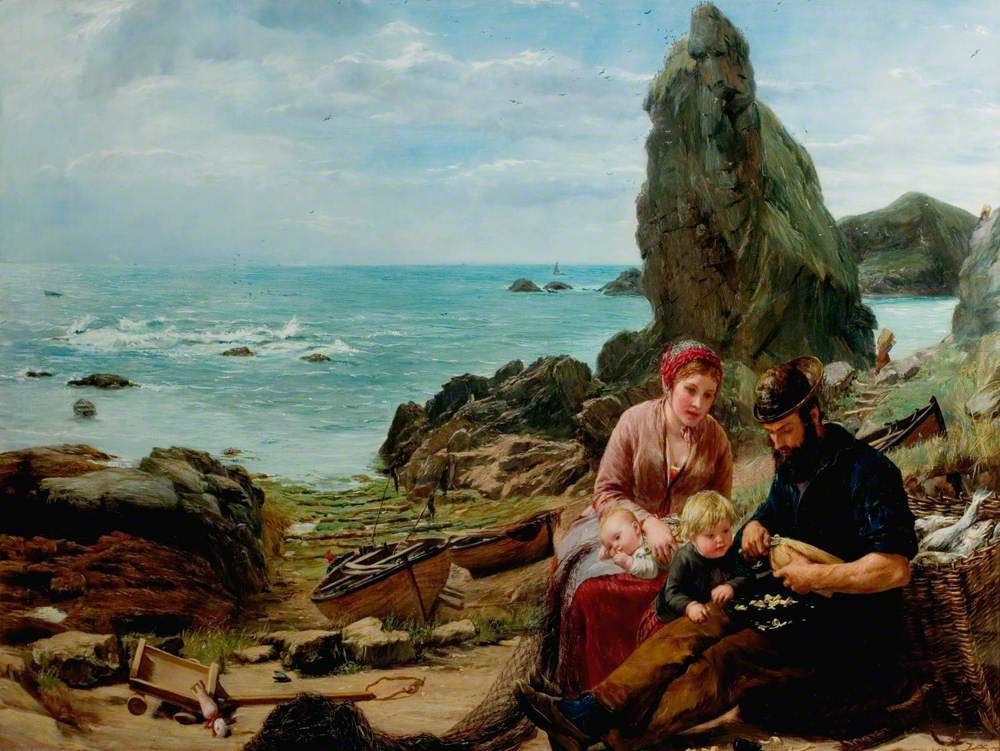
- Artist: James Clarke Hook
- Year: 1875
- Type: Oil on canvas, genre painting
- Dimensions: 95.3 cm × 143.5 cm (37.5 in × 56.5 in)
- Location: Nottingham Castle, Nottingham

Hearts of Oak is an oil on canvas genre painting by the British artist James Clarke Hook, from 1875. It features a coastal scene with a fisherman carving a wooden ship for a boy. The title makes reference to the patriotic song Heart of Oak, associated with the Royal Navy.

It as displayed at the Royal Academy Exhibition of 1875 at Burlington House in London with a quote from Shakespeare's King John. Today it forms part of the collection of Nottingham Castle, which acquired it in 1913.

== Bibliography ==
- Flint, Kate. The Victorians and the Visual Imagination. Cambridge University Press, 2000.
- McMaster, Juliet. James Clarke Hook: Painter of the Sea. McGill-Queen's University Press, 2023.
- Payne, Christiana. Where the Sea Meets the Land: Artists on the Coast in Nineteenth-century Britain. Sanson, 2007.
