= The Last of the Garrison =

Painting by Briton Rivière

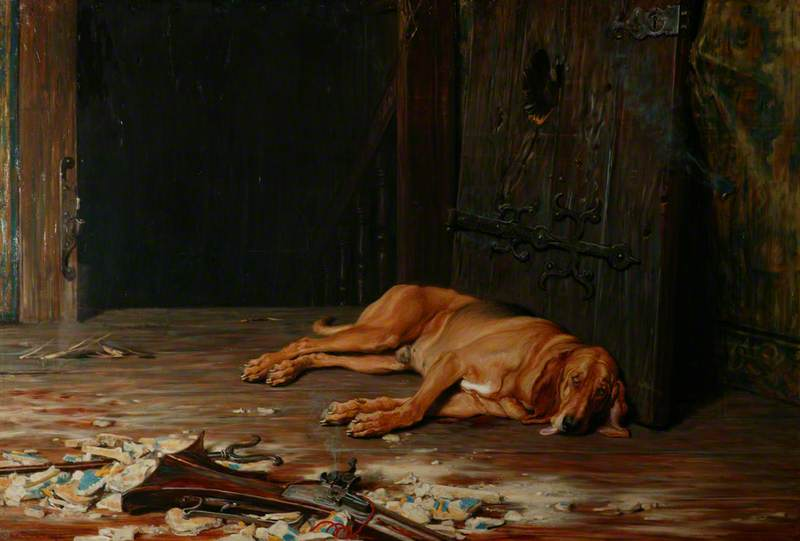
- Artist: Briton Rivière
- Year: 1875
- Type: Oil on canvas, genre painting
- Dimensions: 105 cm × 152.8 cm (41 in × 60.2 in)
- Location: Manchester Art Gallery, Manchester

The Last of the Garrison is an oil painting on canvas by British artist Briton Rivière, from 1875.

A historical genre painting it shows a scene from the English Civil War of the mid-seventeenth century. A bloodhound lies fatally wounded, the last defender of the Royalist garrison of a manor house under enemy assault.

The picture was display at the Royal Academy Exhibition of 1875 held at Burlington House in London. It was acquired by Manchester Art Gallery in 1898 from the art dealers Thomas Agnew and Sons. In 1913 it was subject to vandalism during an attack by Suffragettes.

== Bibliography ==
- Jackson, Penelope. Females in the Frame: Women, Art, and Crime. Springer International Publishing, 2020.
