= Royal Academy Exhibition of 1875 =

1875 art exhibition in London

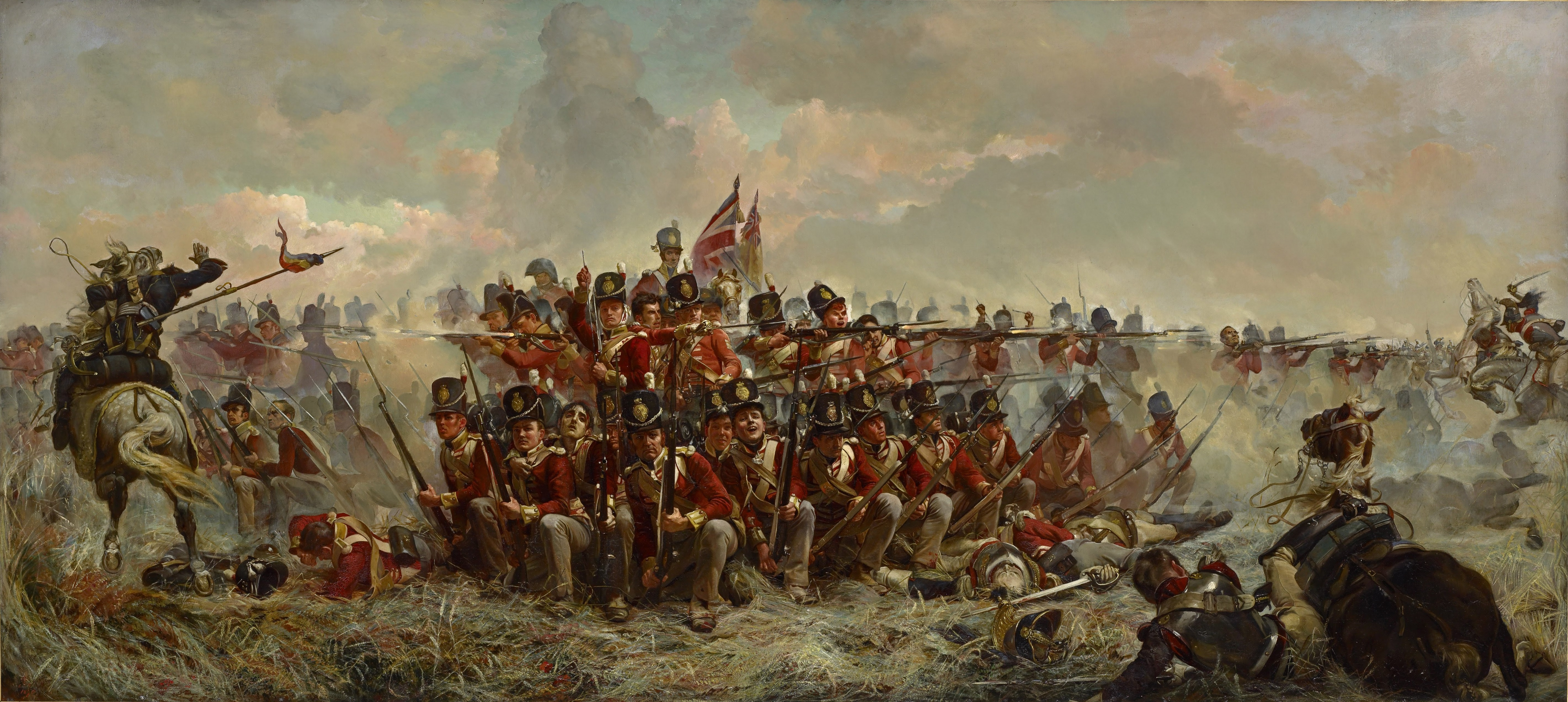
The Twenty Eighth Regiment at Quatre Bras by Elizabeth Thompson

The Royal Academy Exhibition of 1875 was the hundred and seventh annual Summer Exhibition of the British Royal Academy of Arts which was held at Burlington House in London's Piccadilly between 3 May to 2 August 1875. It featured sunmissions from leading painters, sculptors and architects of the Victorian era. The Babylonian Marriage Market by Edwin Long was one of the most talked-about paintings on display and reflected the fashion for Orientalist subjecs, reflected in a number of works shown that year. Henry Wallis displayed Fugitives from Constantinople, depicting fleeing figures from the fallen Byzantine Empire in 1453 who would help power the Italian Renaissance.

John Everett Millais displayed his landscape painting The Fringe of the Moor as well as The Deserted Garden. Frederic Leighton was an influential figure at the exhibition, reflecting his growing dominance at the Royal Academy, which would lead to his election as President three years laters. Charles West Cope produced a depiction hanging committee's examination of submitted works for the 1875 exhibition in his painting The Council of the Royal Academy Selecting Pictures for the Exhibition, which he displayed at the subsequent Royal Academy Exhibition of 1876.

== Gallery ==
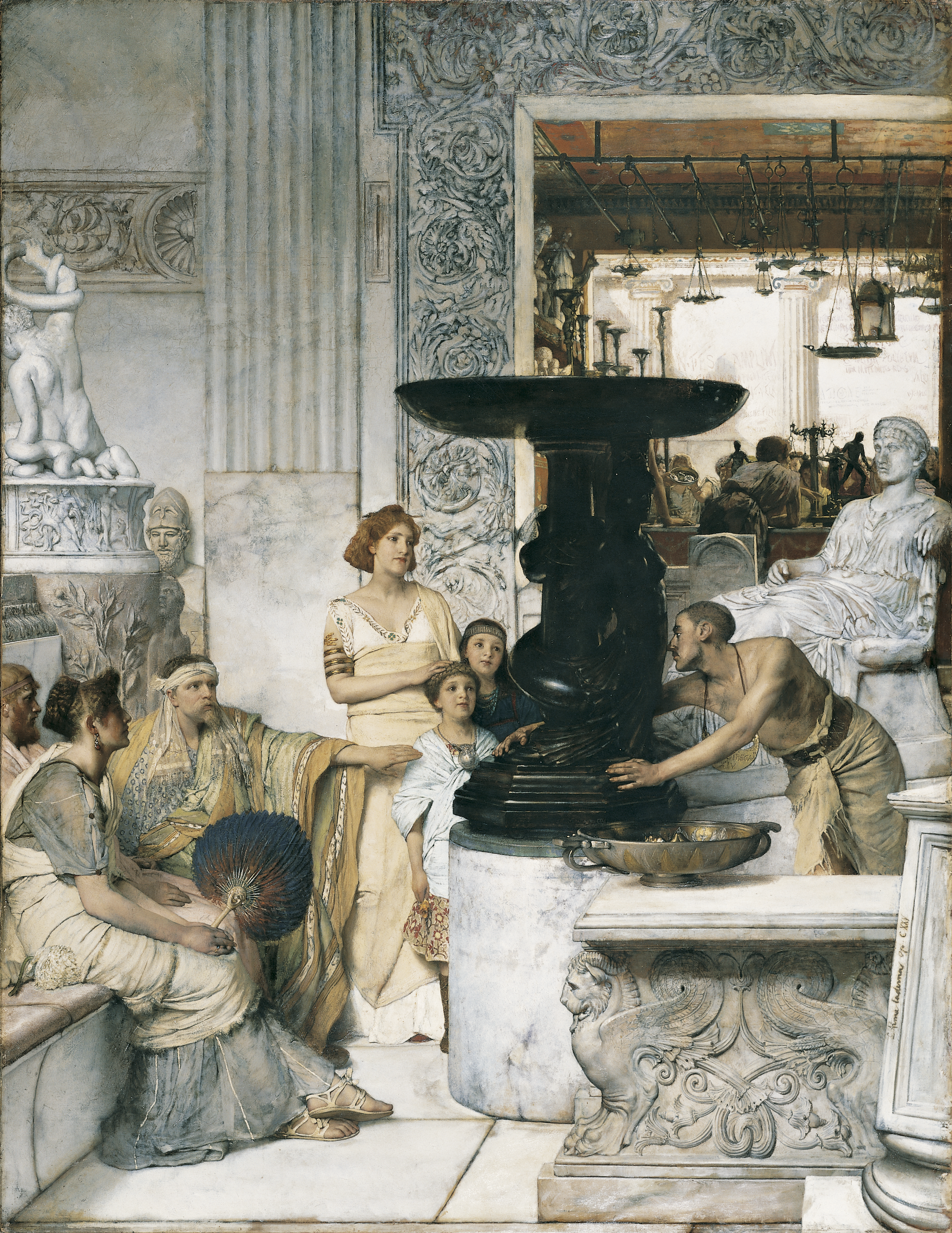
The Sculpture Gallery by Lawrence Alma-Tadema

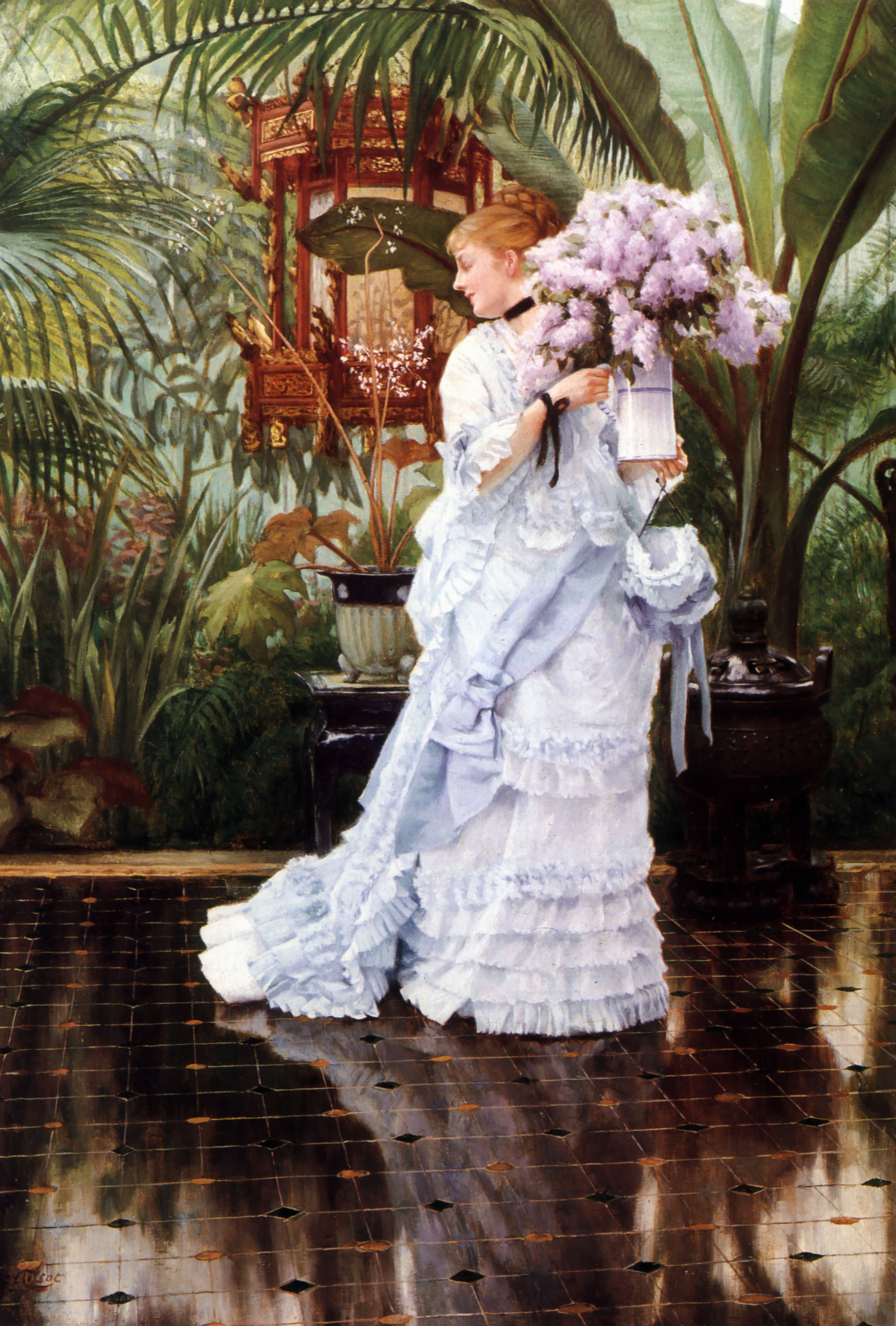
The Bunch of Lilacs by James Tissot

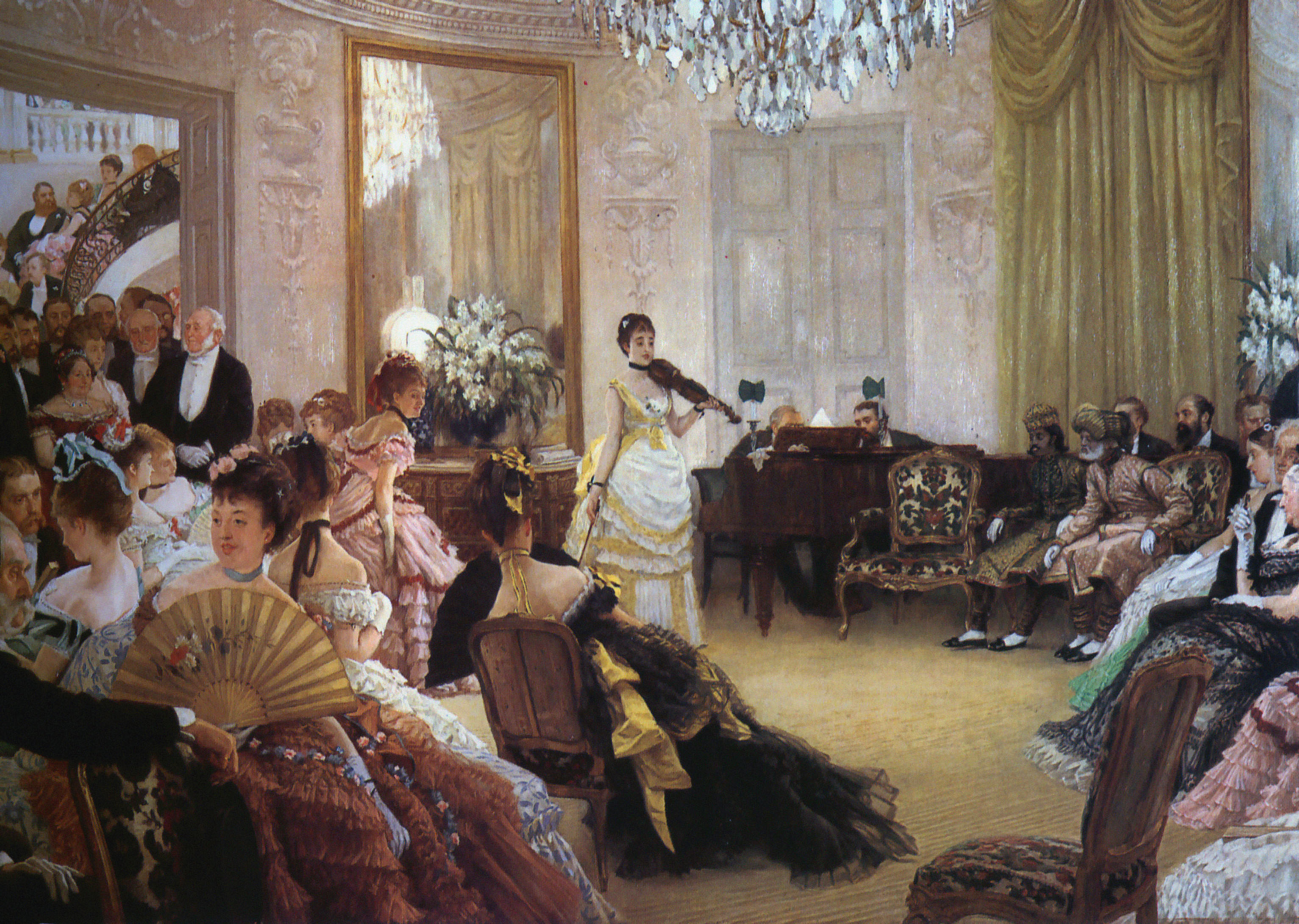
Hush! by James Tissot

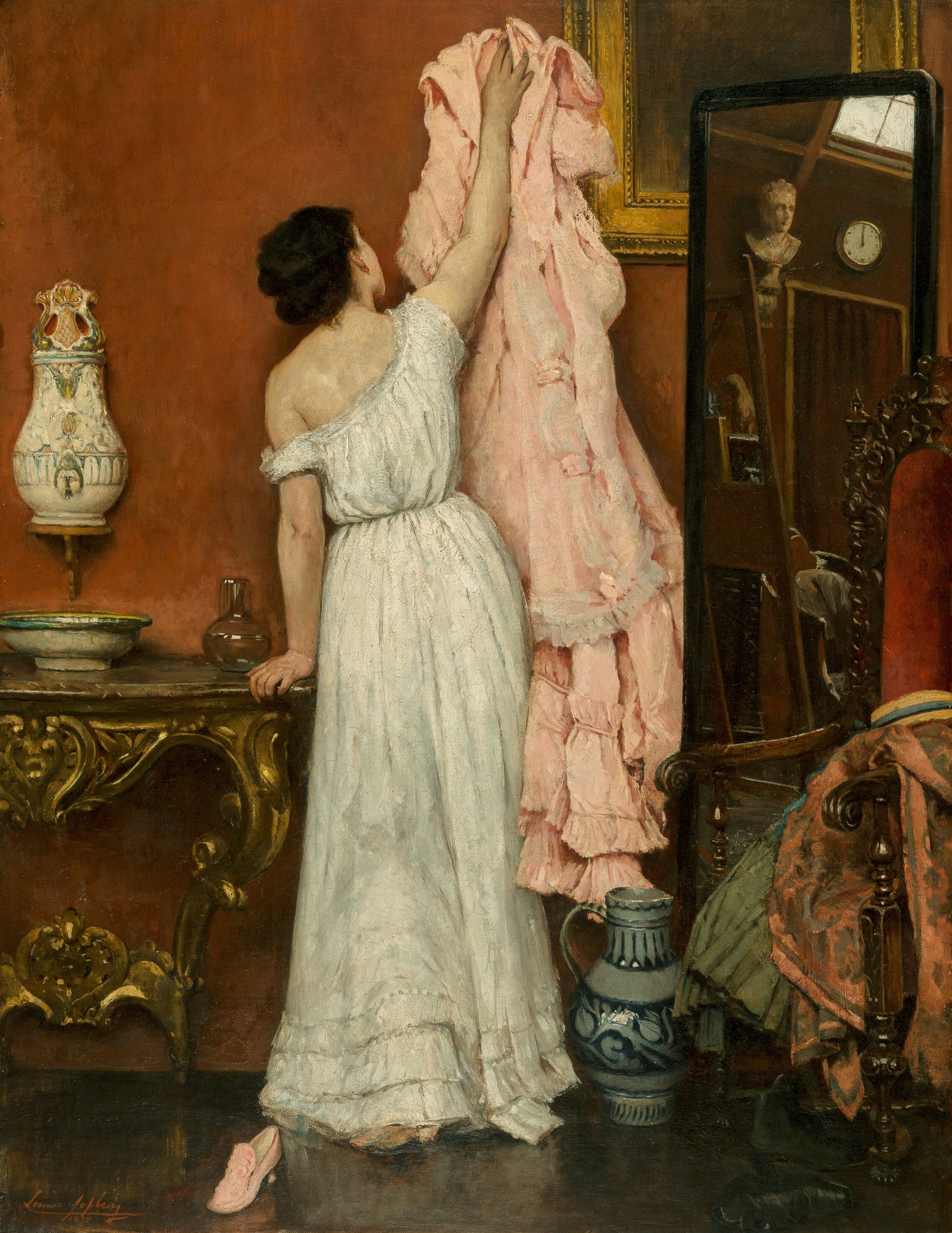
A Modern Cinderella by Louise Jopling

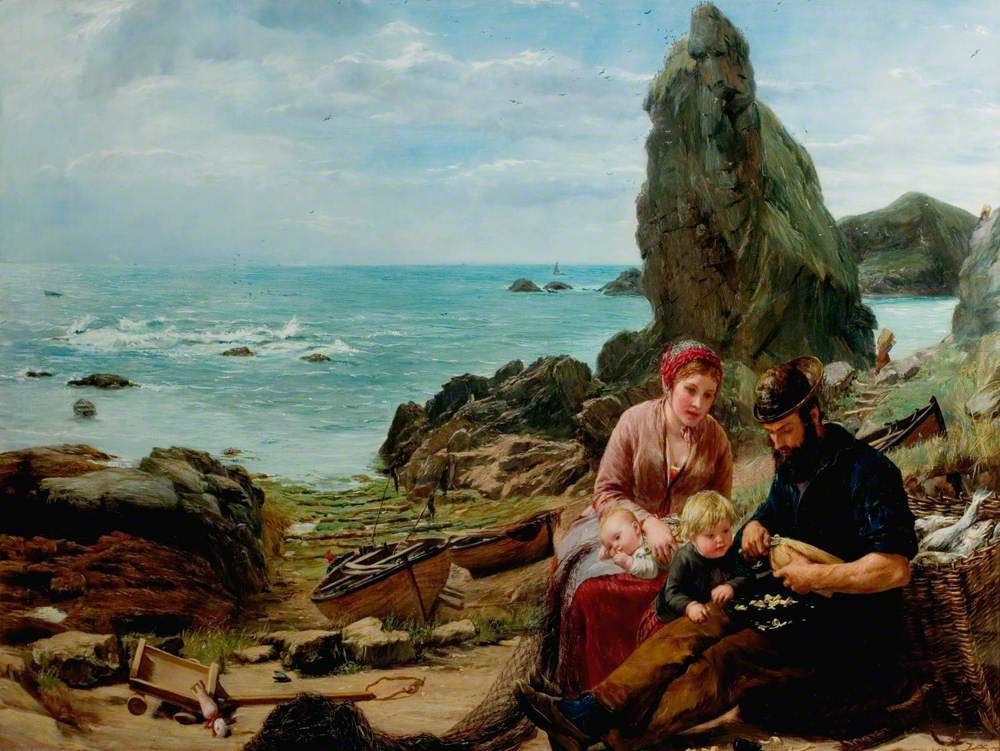
Hearts of Oak by James Clarke Hook

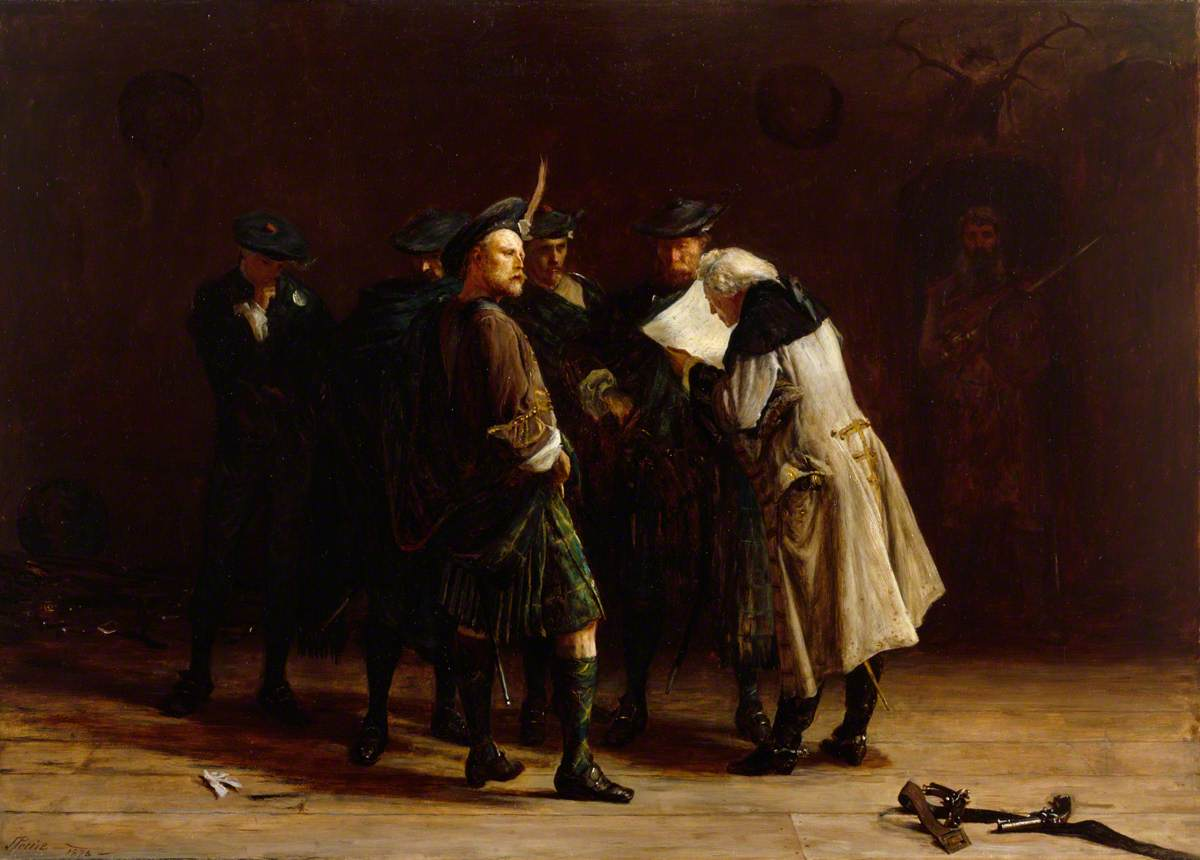
Jacobites, 1745 by John Pettie

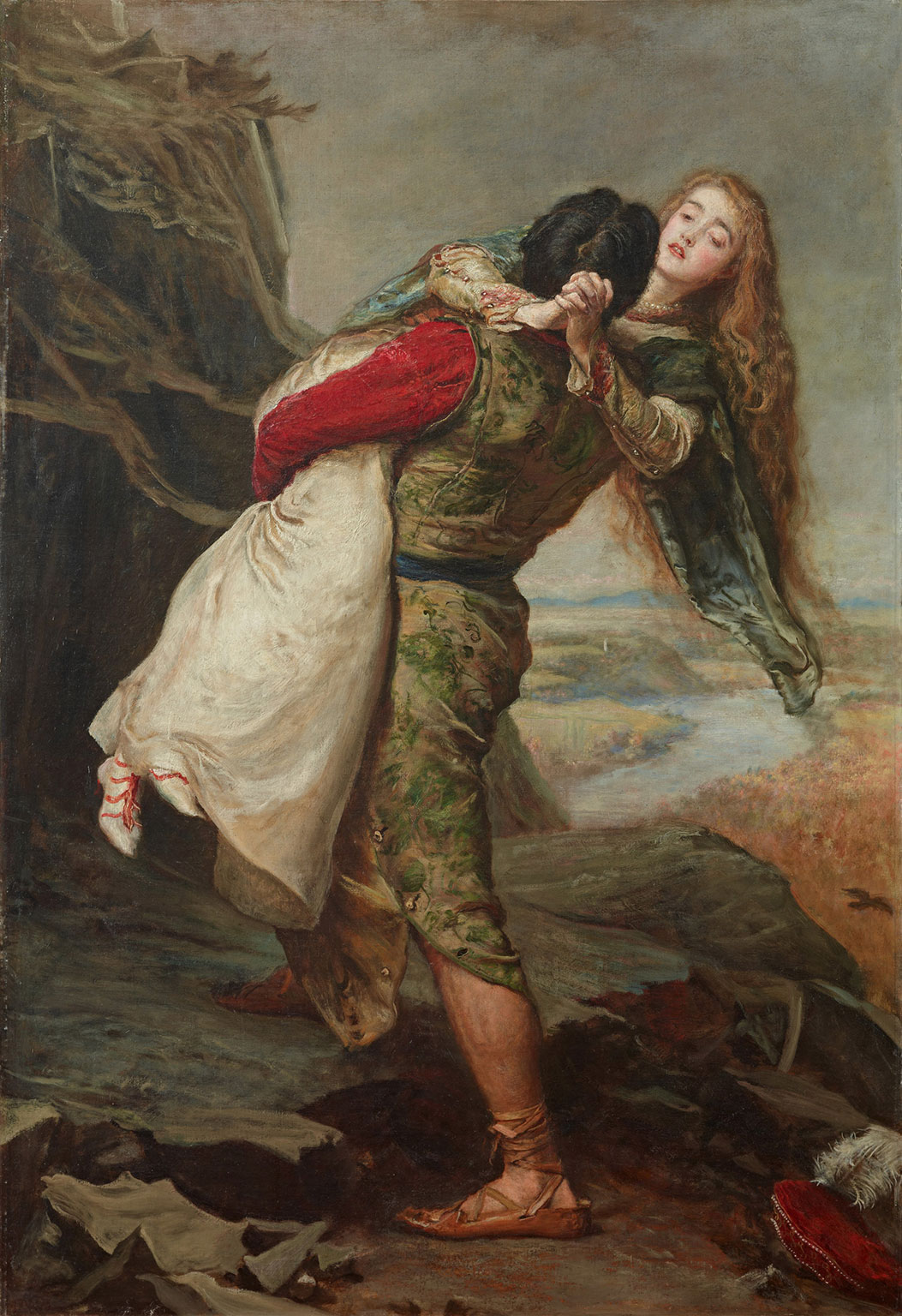
The Crown of Love by John Everett Millais

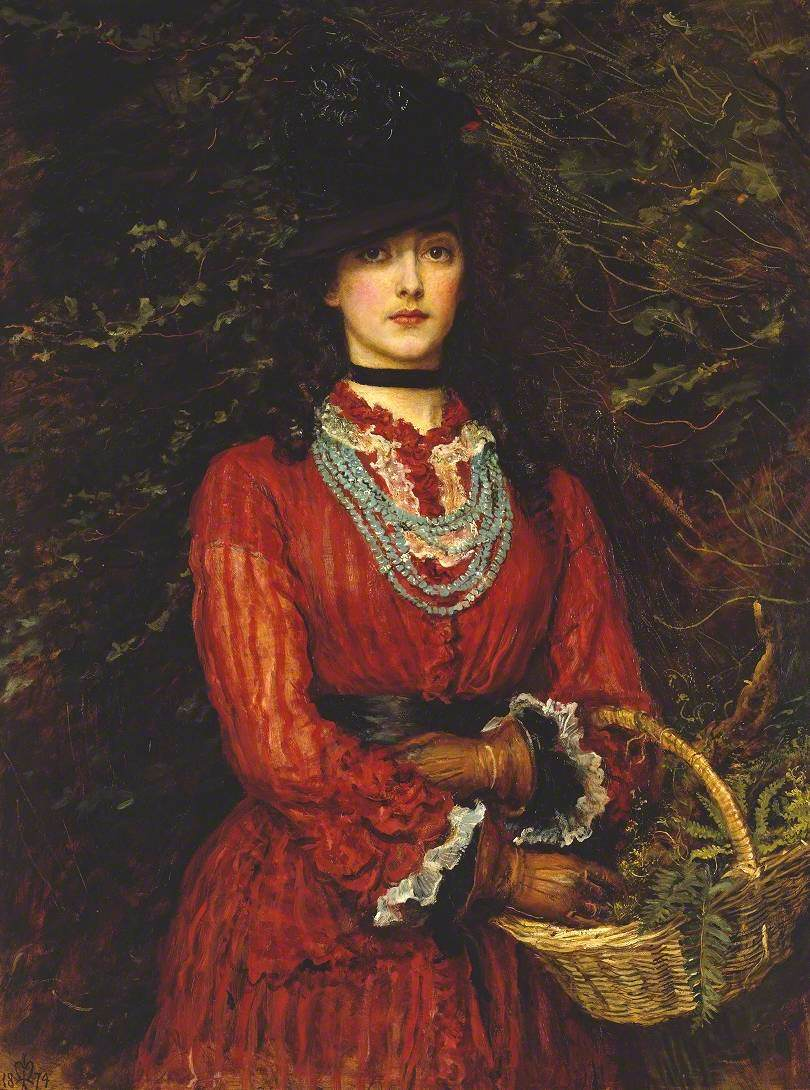
Miss Eveleen Tennant by John Everett Millais

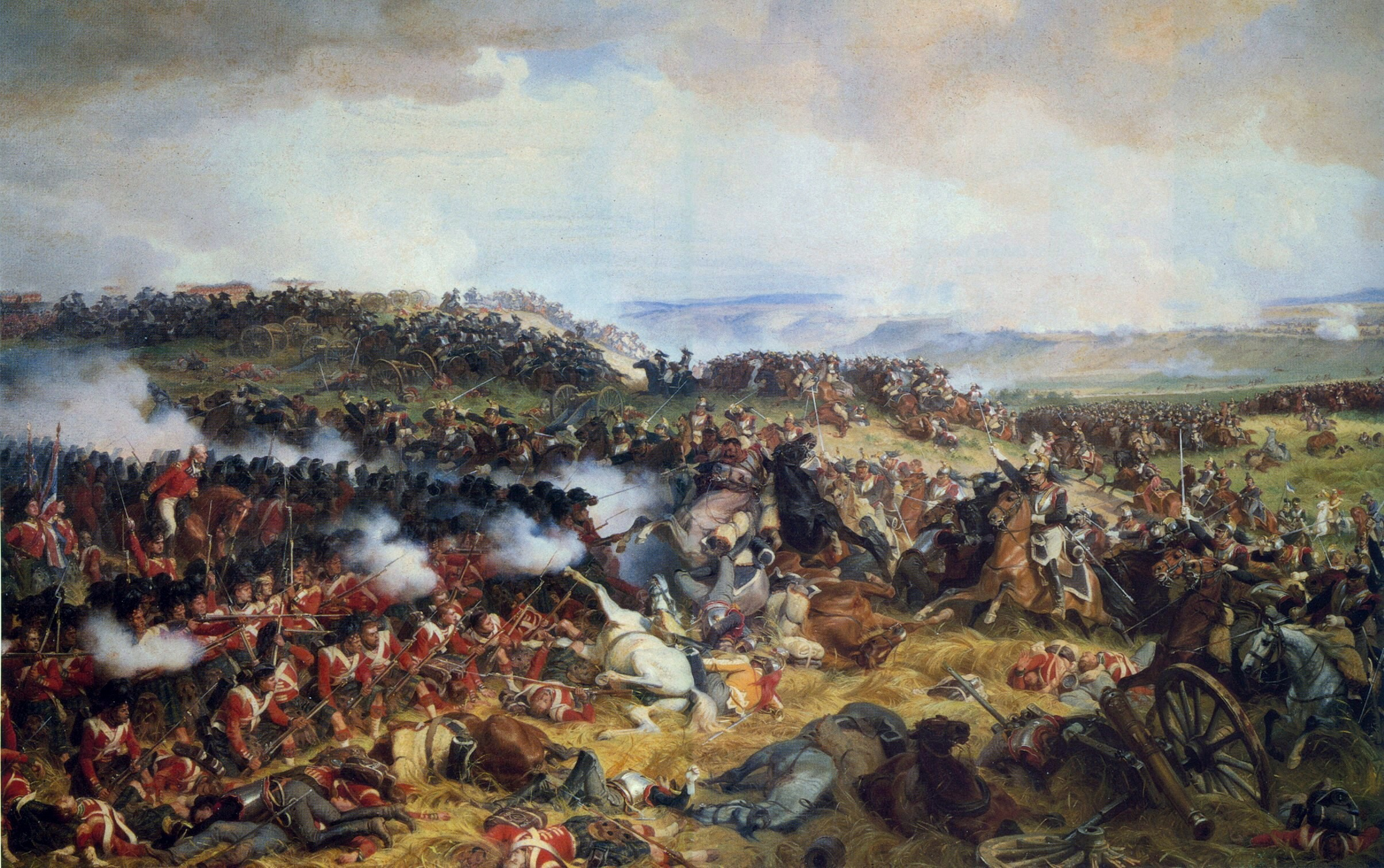
The Charge of the French Cuirassiers at Waterloo by Henri Félix Emmanuel Philippoteaux

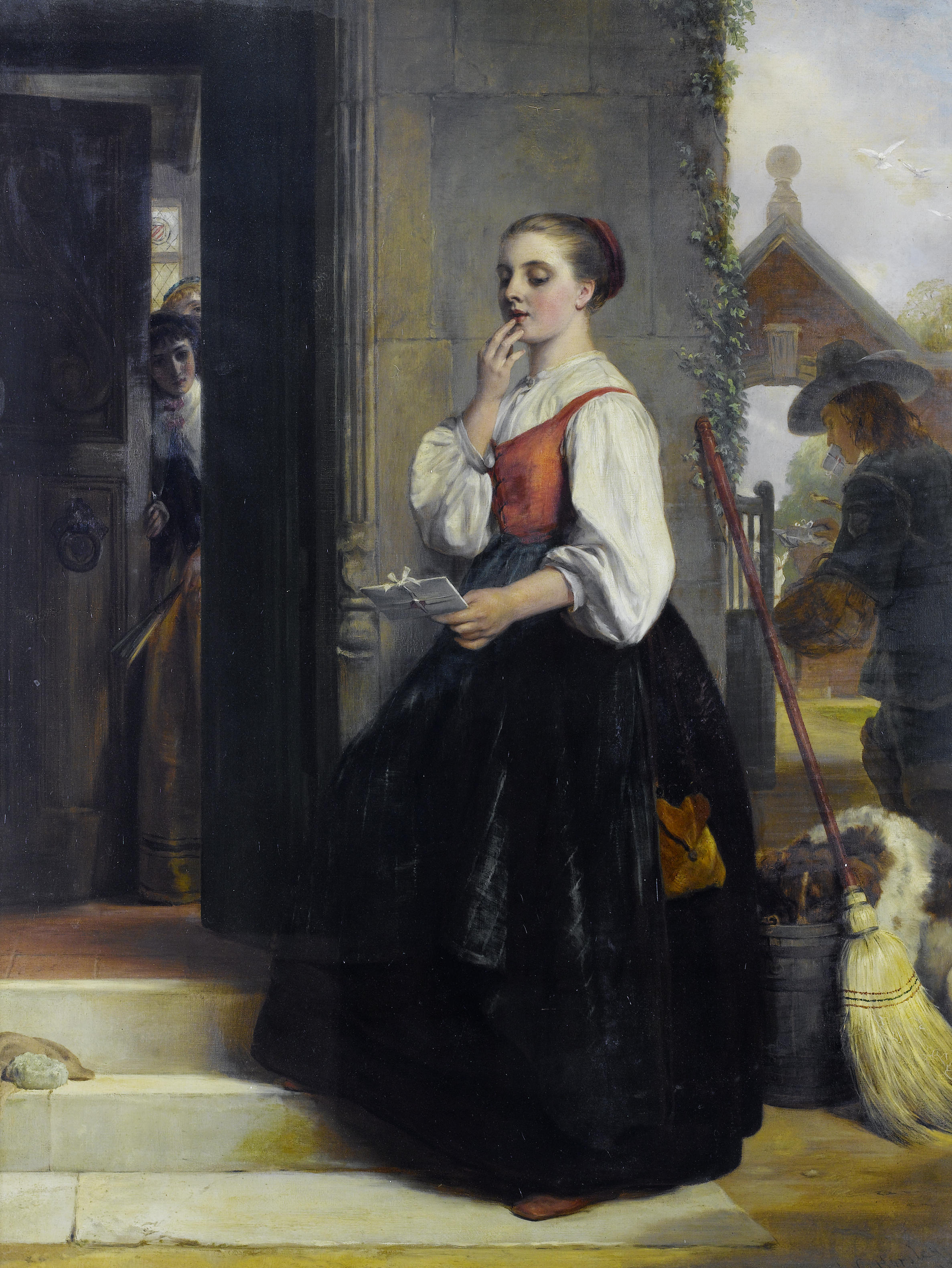
The Waiting Maid by John Callcott Horsley

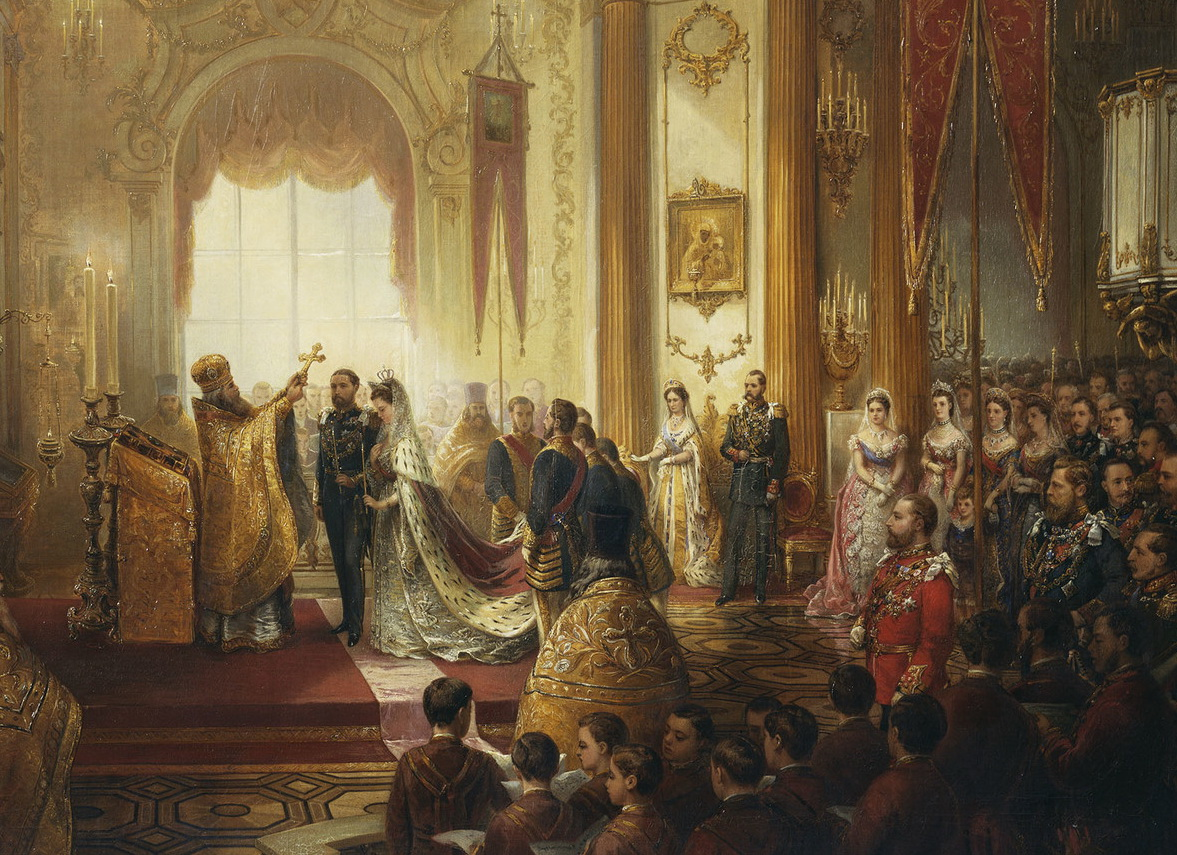
The Marriage of the Duke of Edinburgh by Nicholas Chevalier

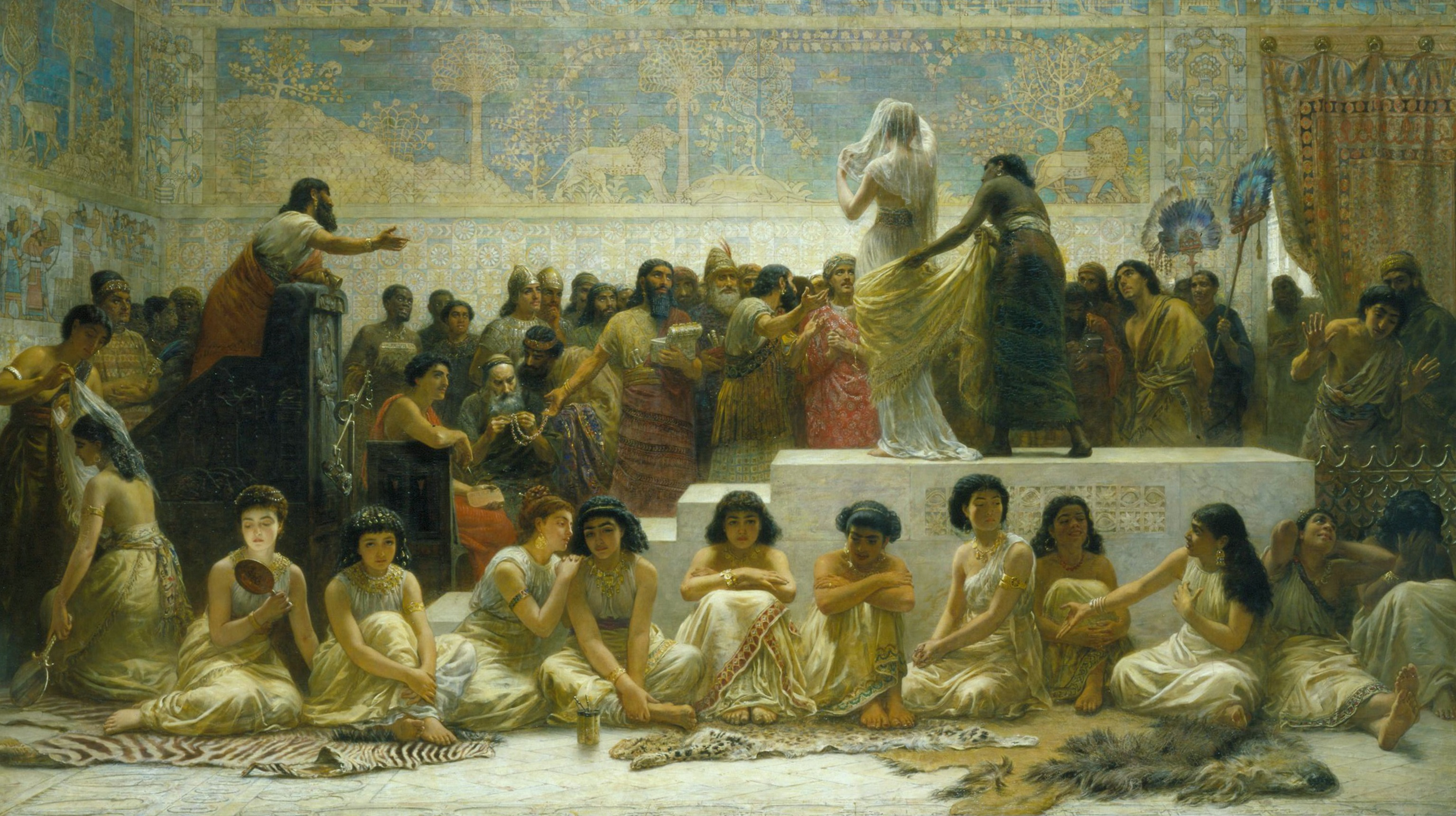
The Babylonian Marriage Market by Edwin Long

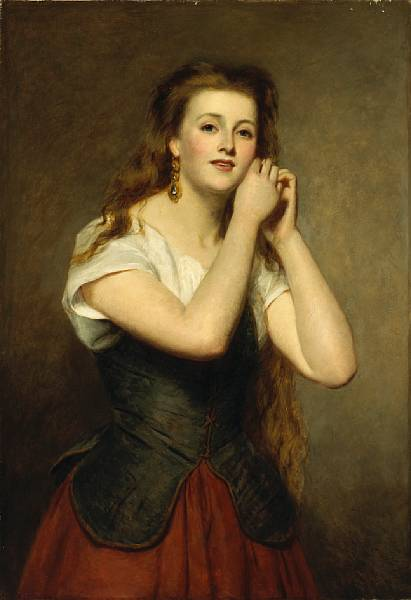
The New Earrings by William Powell Frith

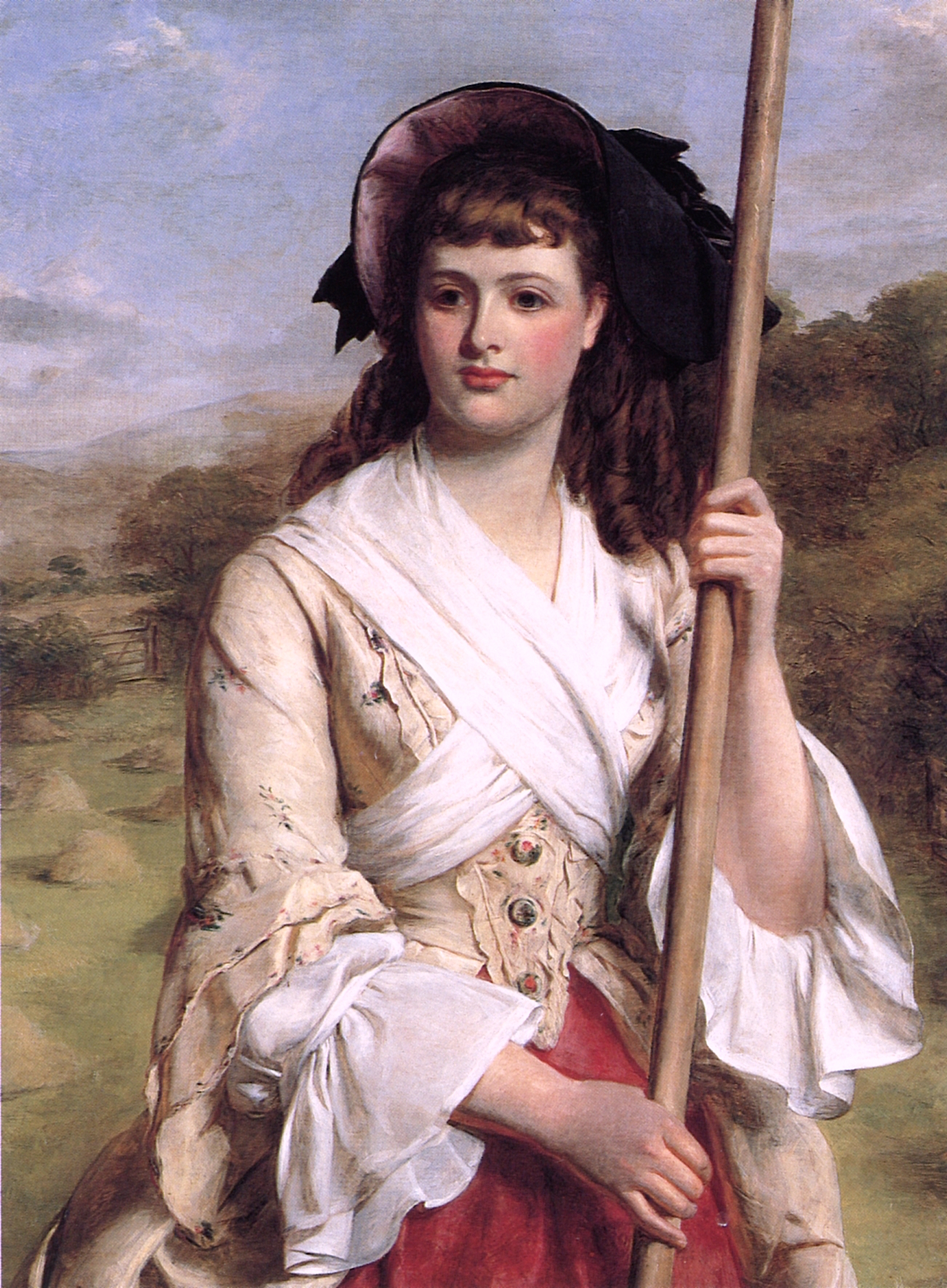
Polly Peachum by William Powell Frith

St Valentine's Day by William Powell Frith

War Time by Briton Rivière

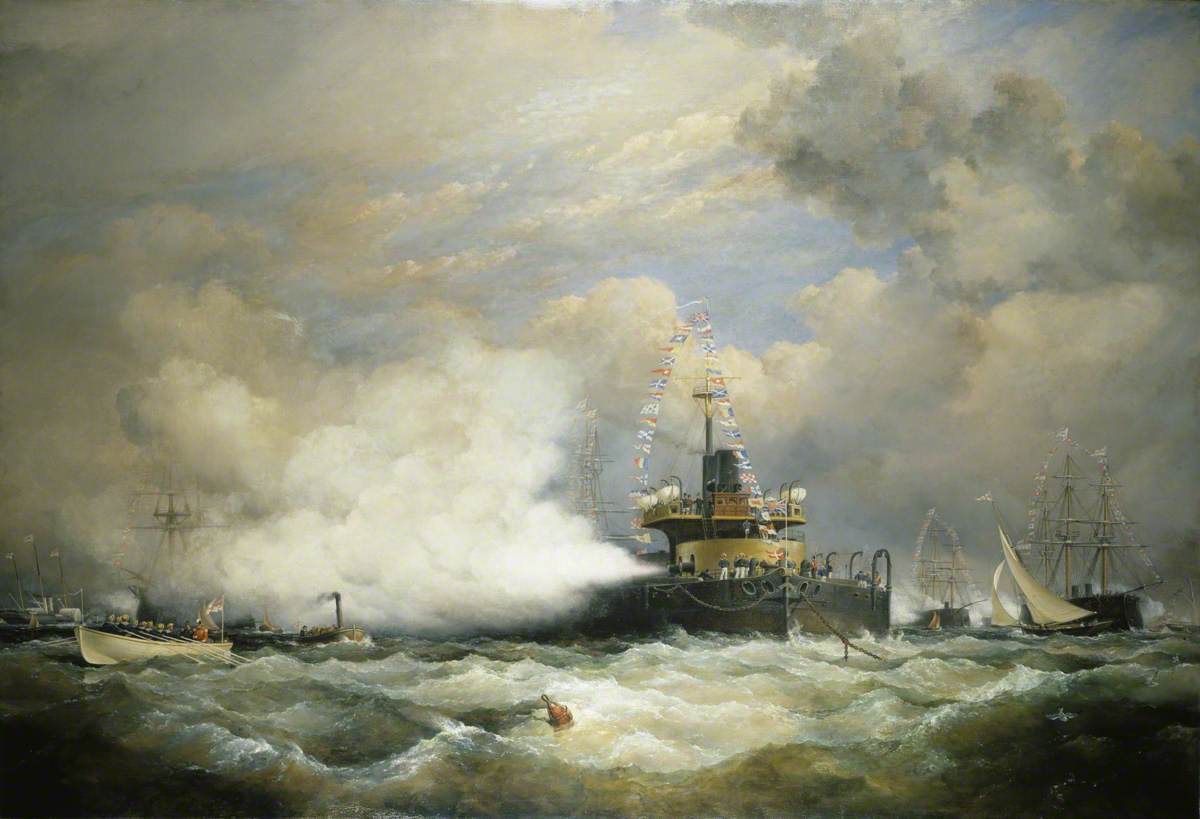
Naval Review in Honour of the Shah of Persia by Edward William Cooke

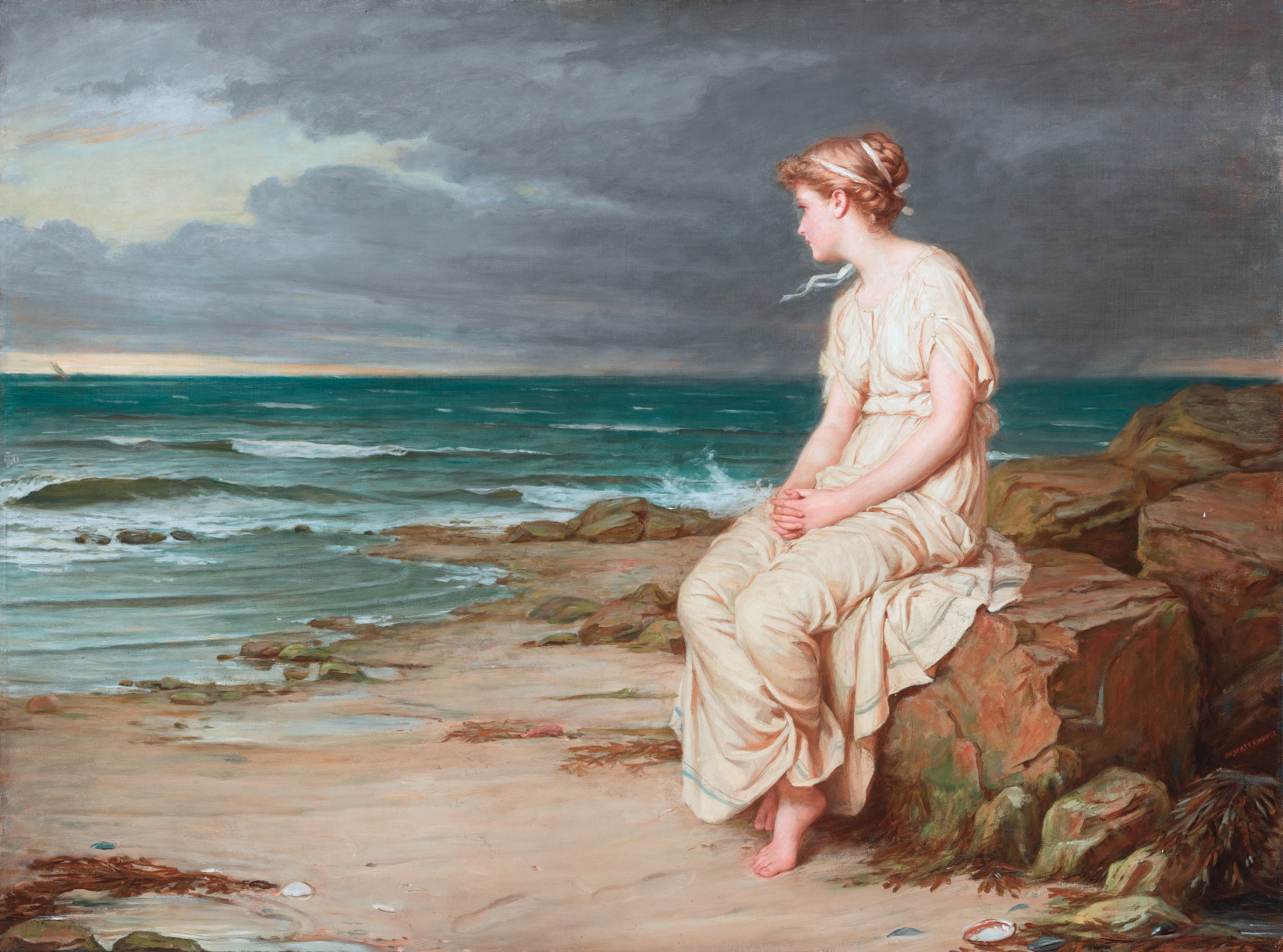
Miranda by John William Waterhouse

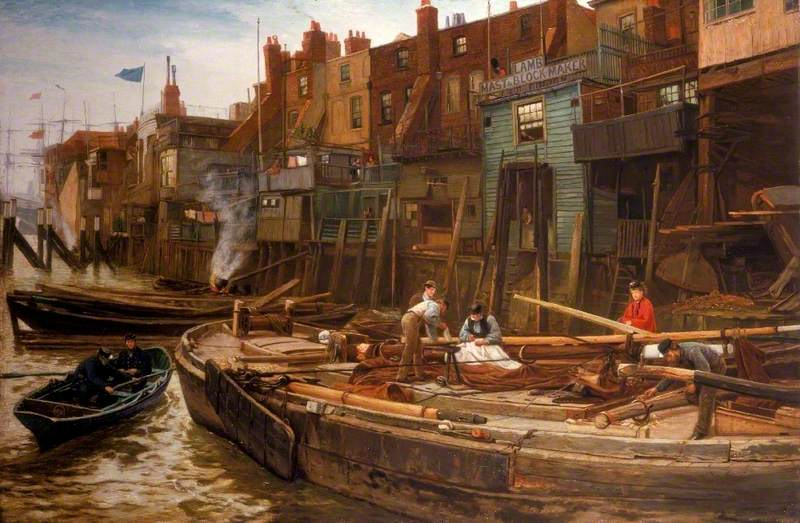
London River, the Limehouse Barge-Builders by Charles Napier Hemy

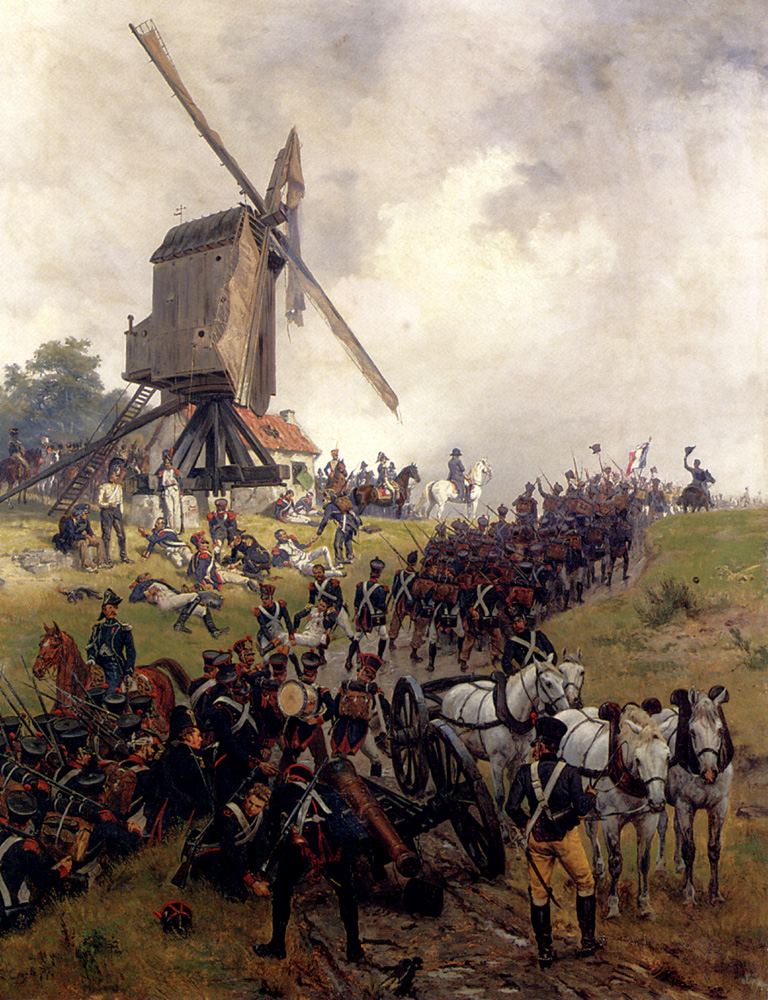
The Battle Of Ligny by Ernest Crofts

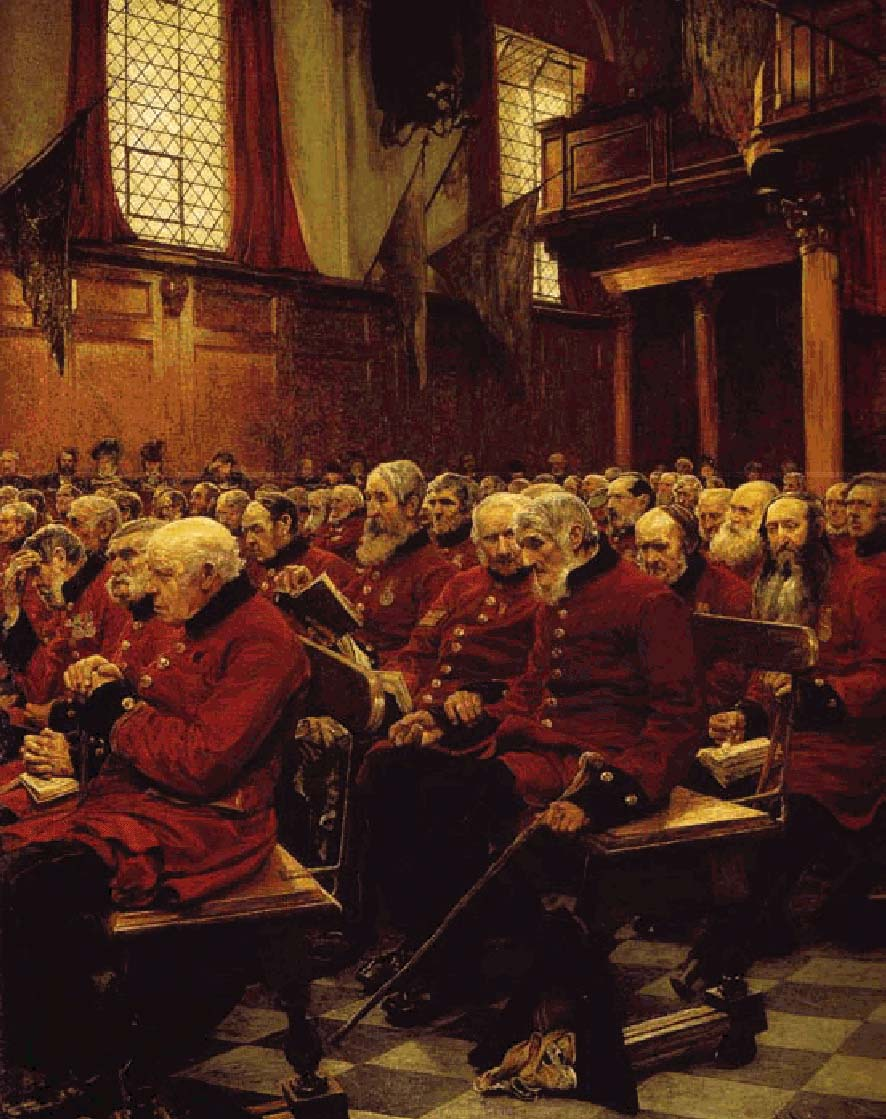
The Last Muster by Hubert von Herkomer

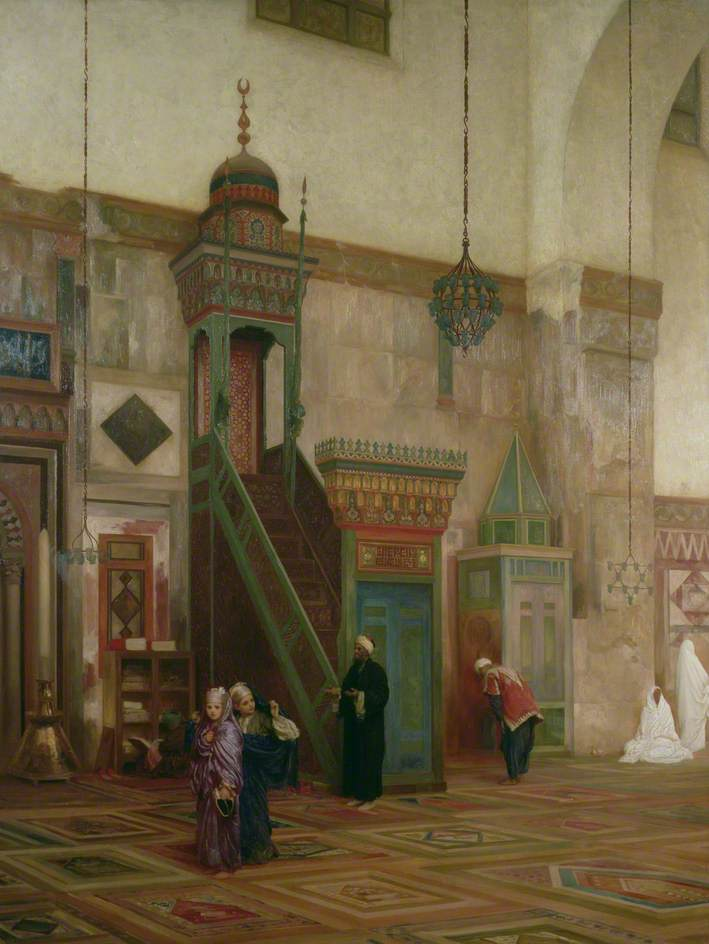
Interior of the Grand Mosque, Damascus by Frederic Leighton

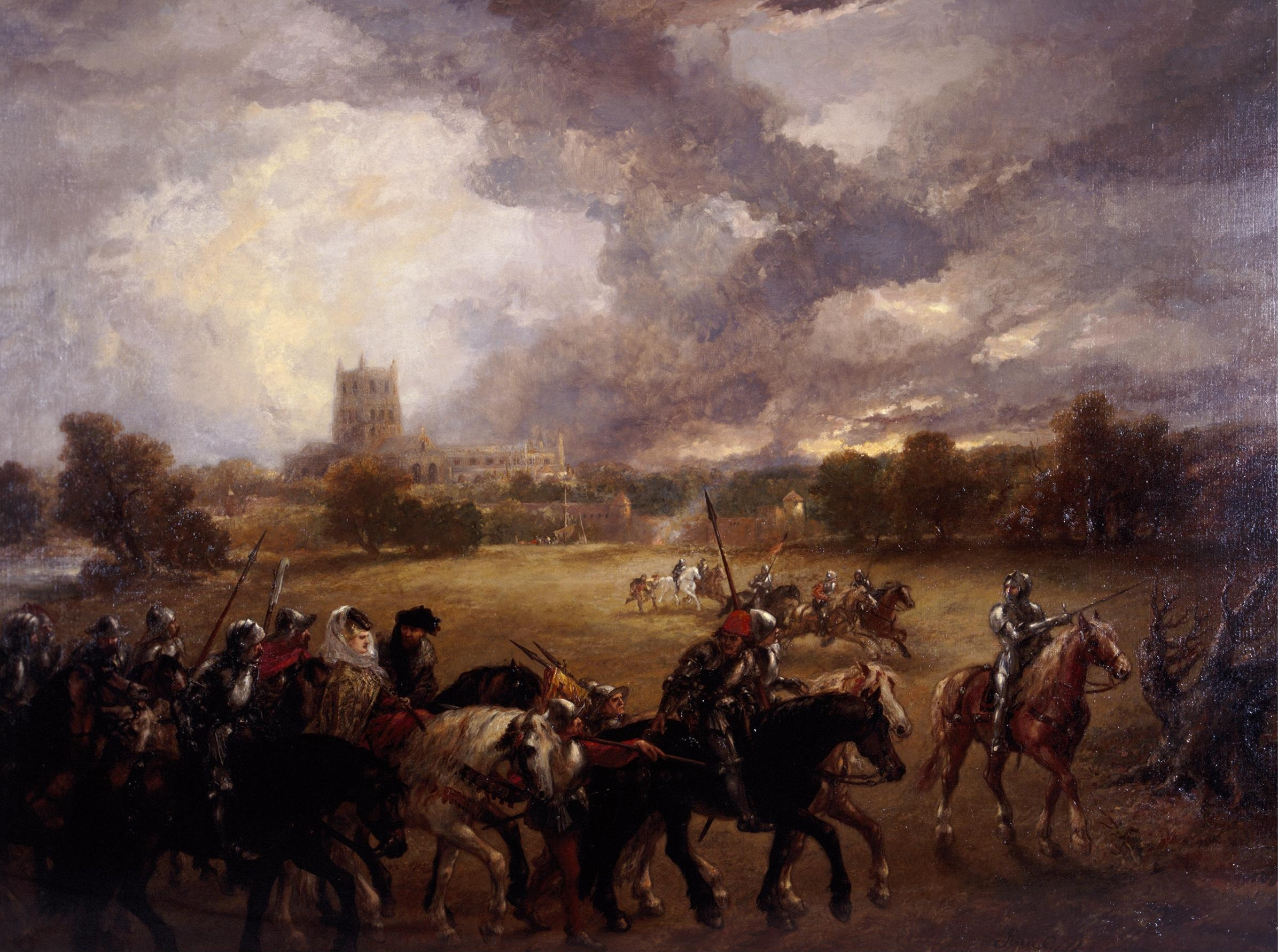
Margaret of Anjou Taken Prisoner After the Battle of Tewkesbury by John Gilbert

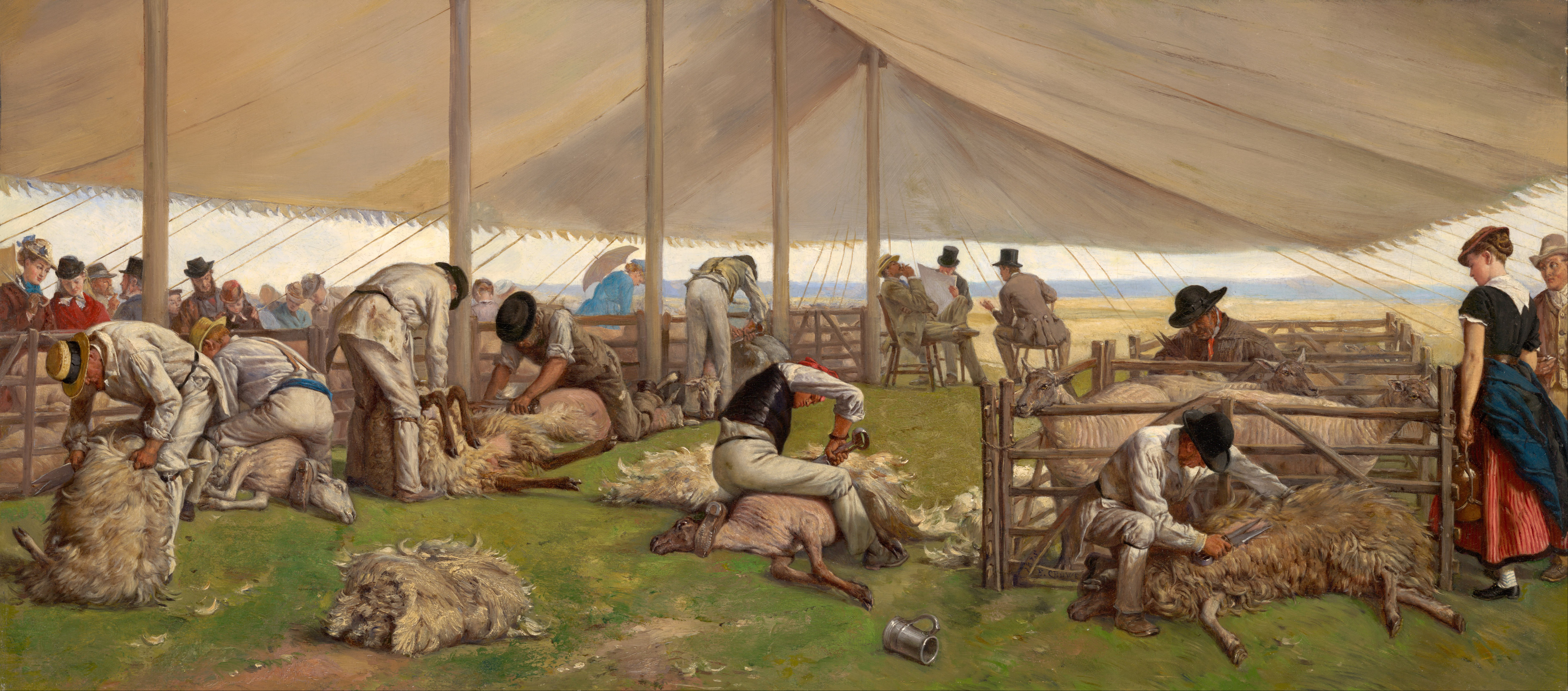
A Sheepshearing Match by Eyre Crowe

The Wetterhorn from Above Rosenlaui by Benjamin Williams Leader

Outside the Harbour by Henry Moore

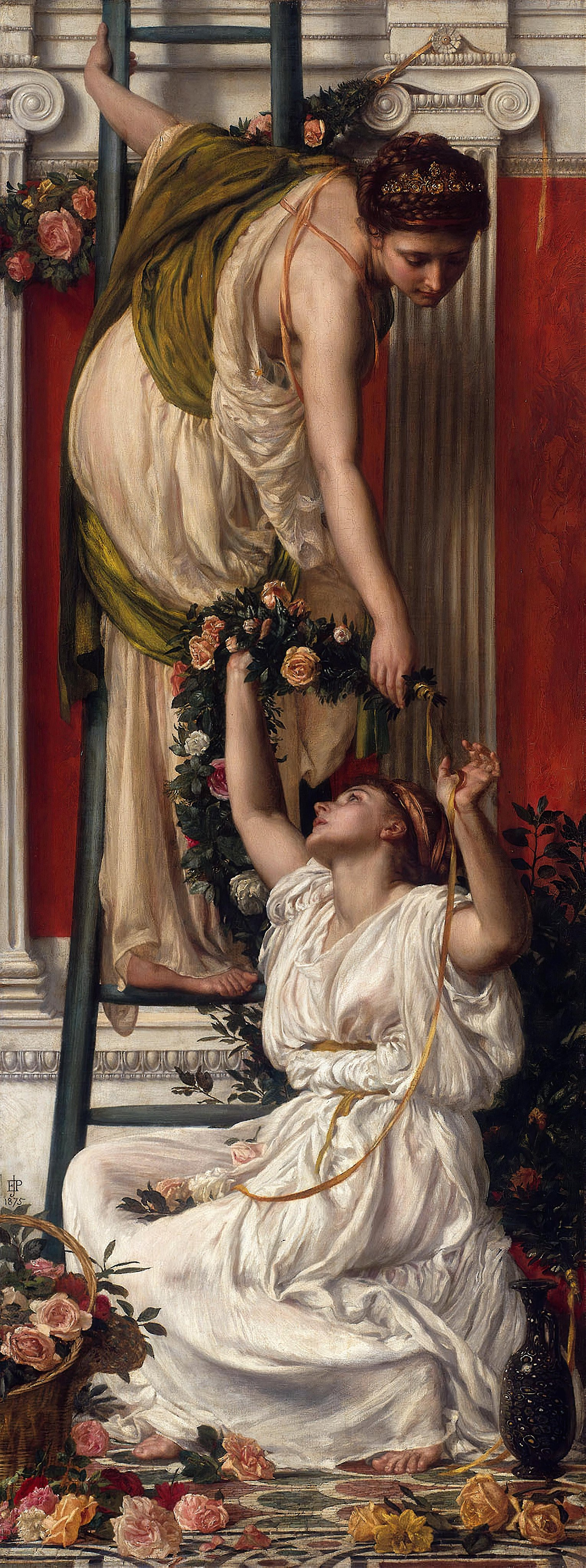
The Festival by Edward Poynter

The Golden Age by Edward Poynter

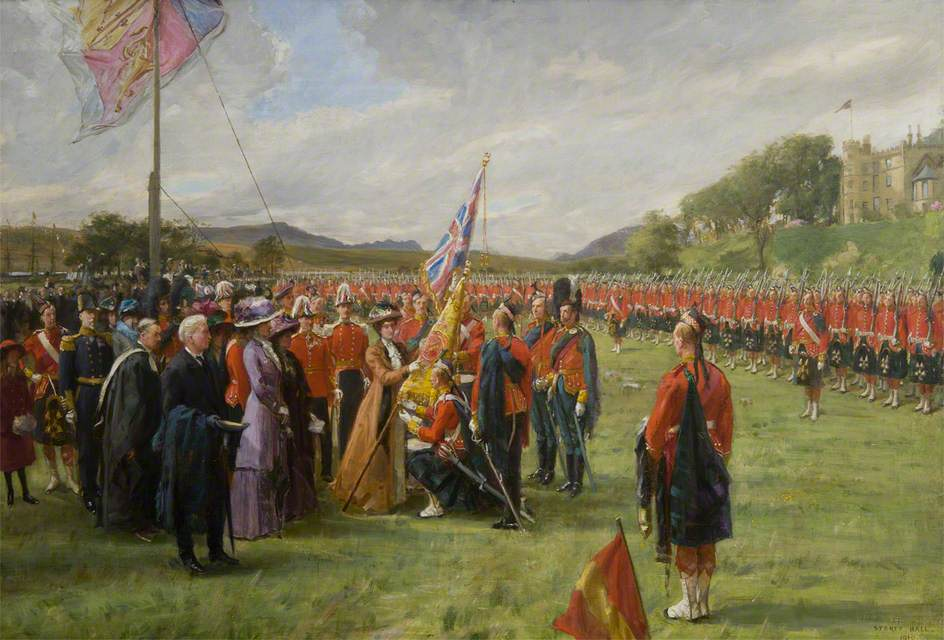
Queen Victoria Presenting New Colours to the Cameron Highlanders by Sydney Prior Hall

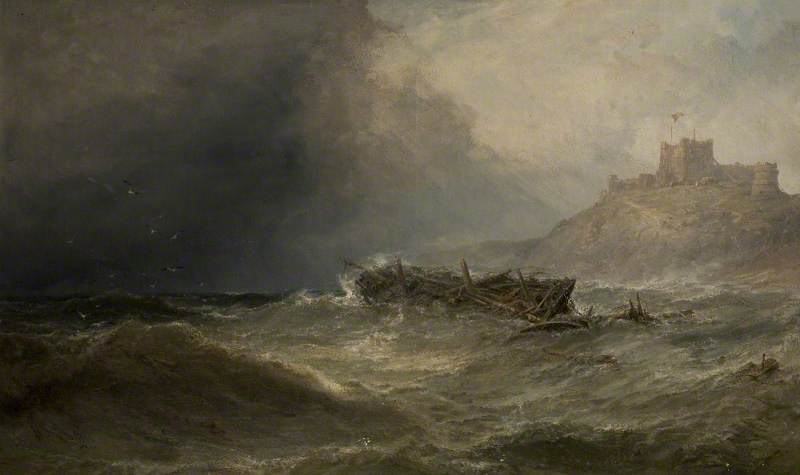
Brig Drifting Ashore off Bamborough by Edwin Hayes

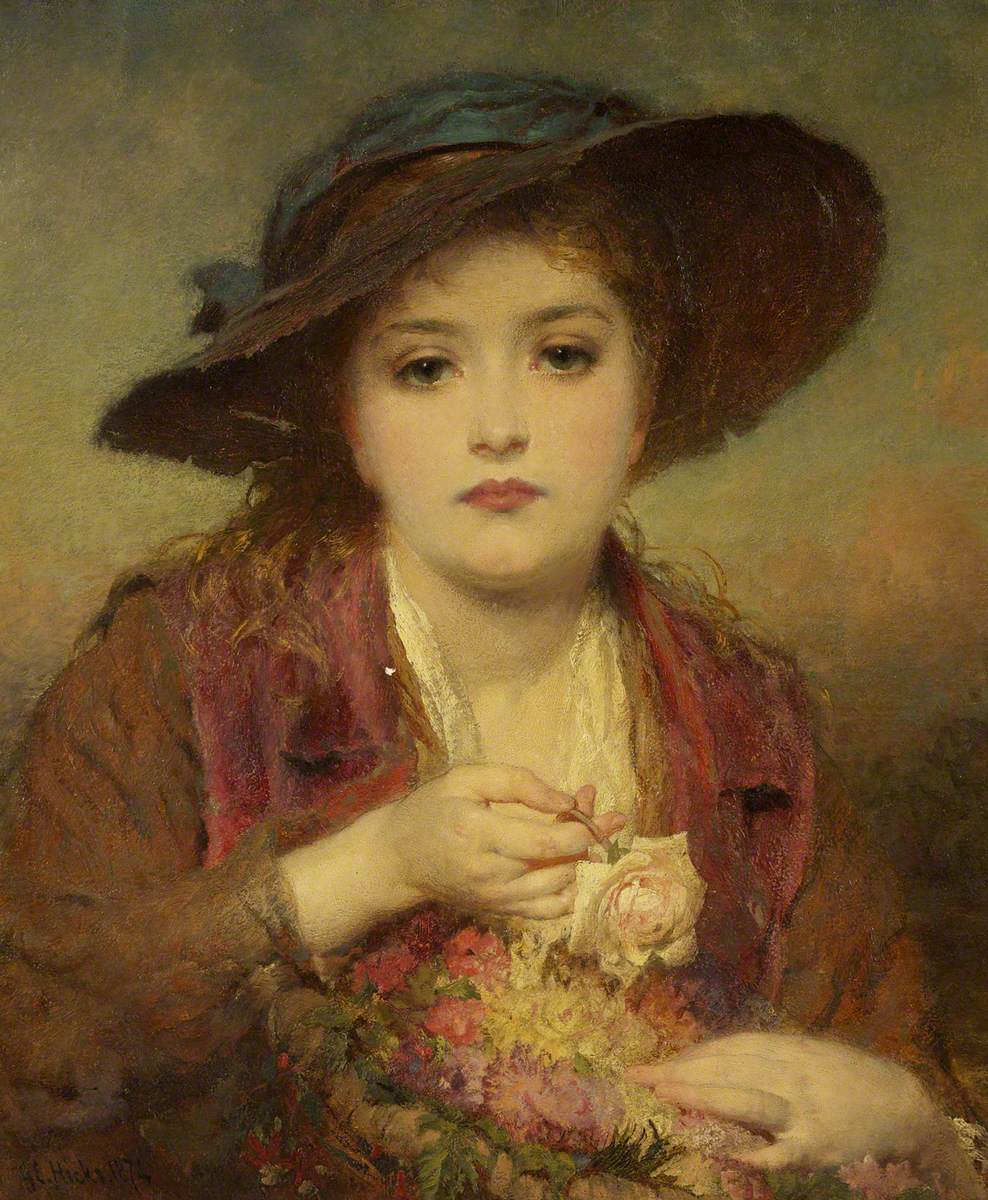
The Flower Girl by George Elgar Hicks

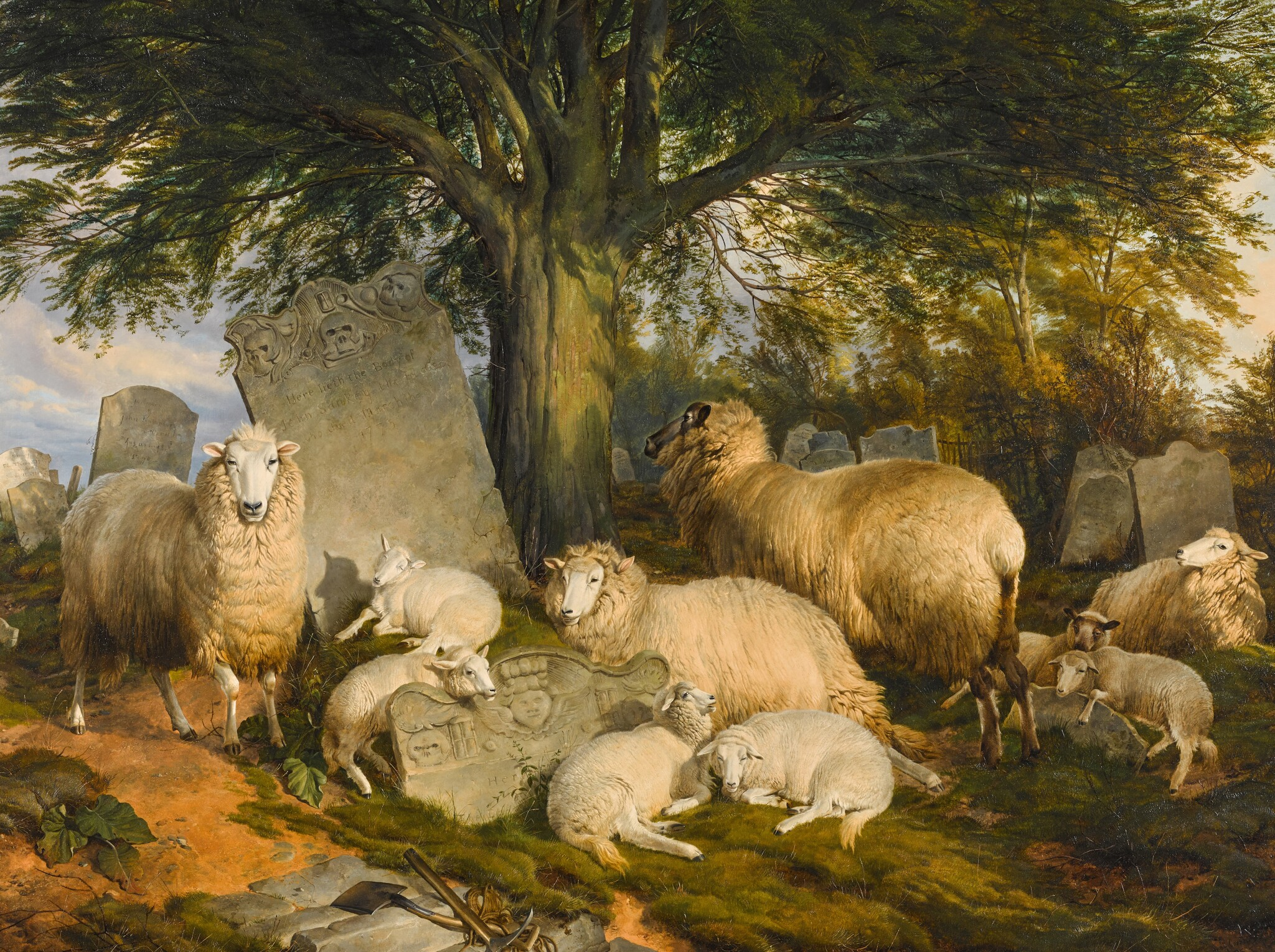
Reposing on God's Acre by Thomas Sidney Cooper

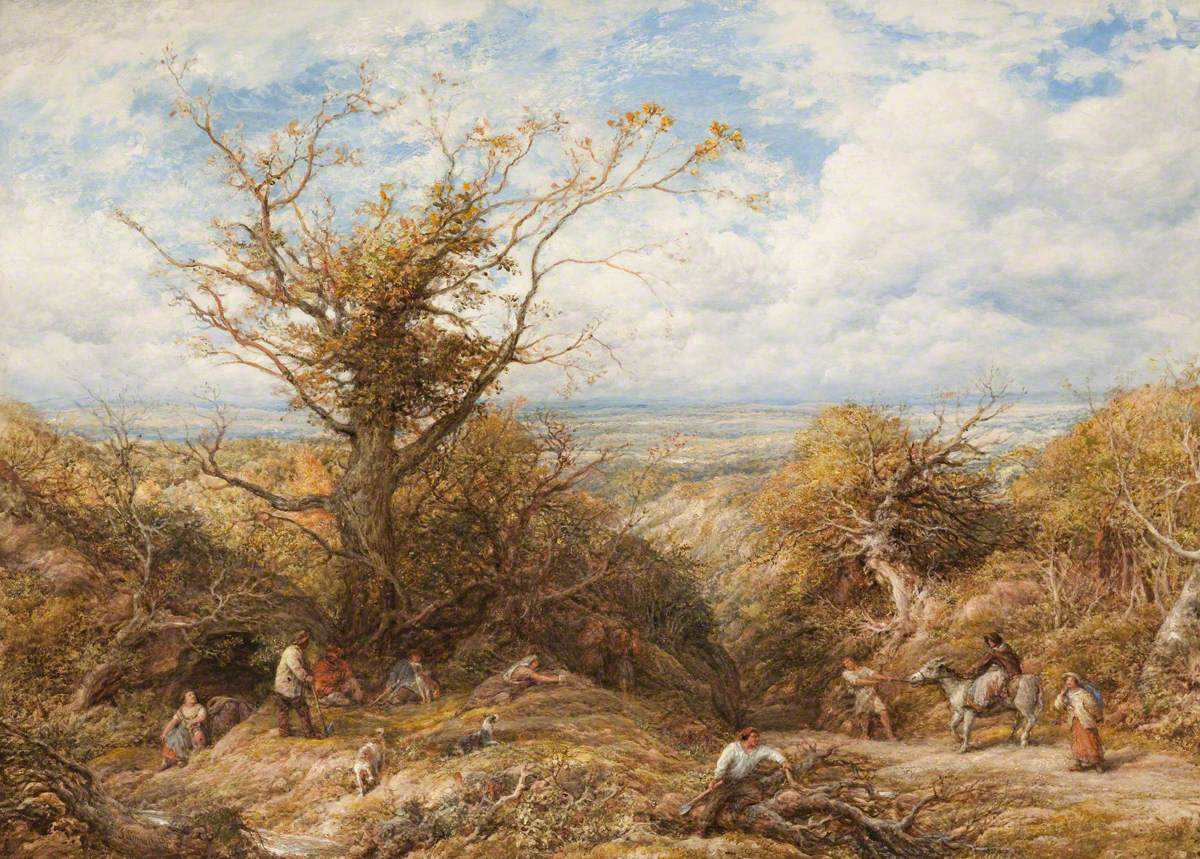
Woods and Forests by John Linnell

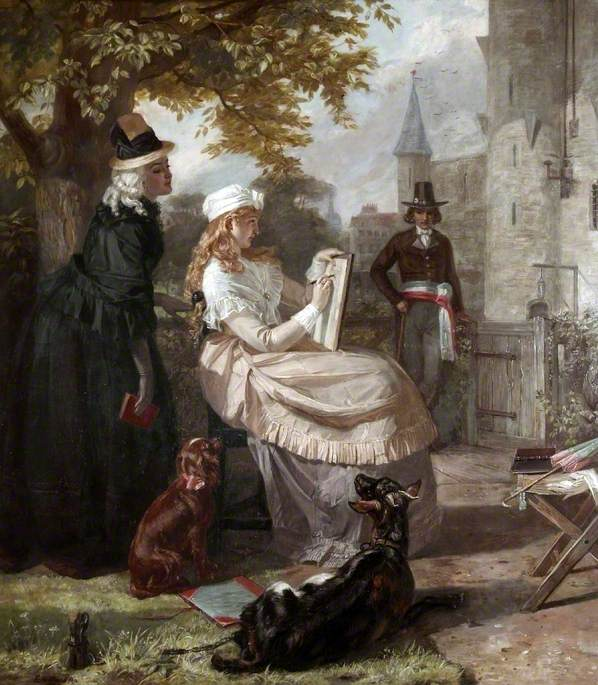
The Orphan of the Temple by Edward Matthew Ward

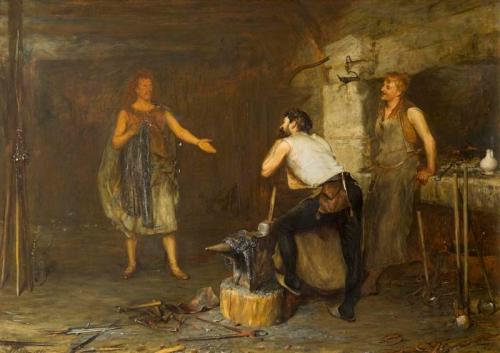
Scene in The Hal of the Wynd's Smith by John Pettie

Rachel and her Flock by Frederick Goodall

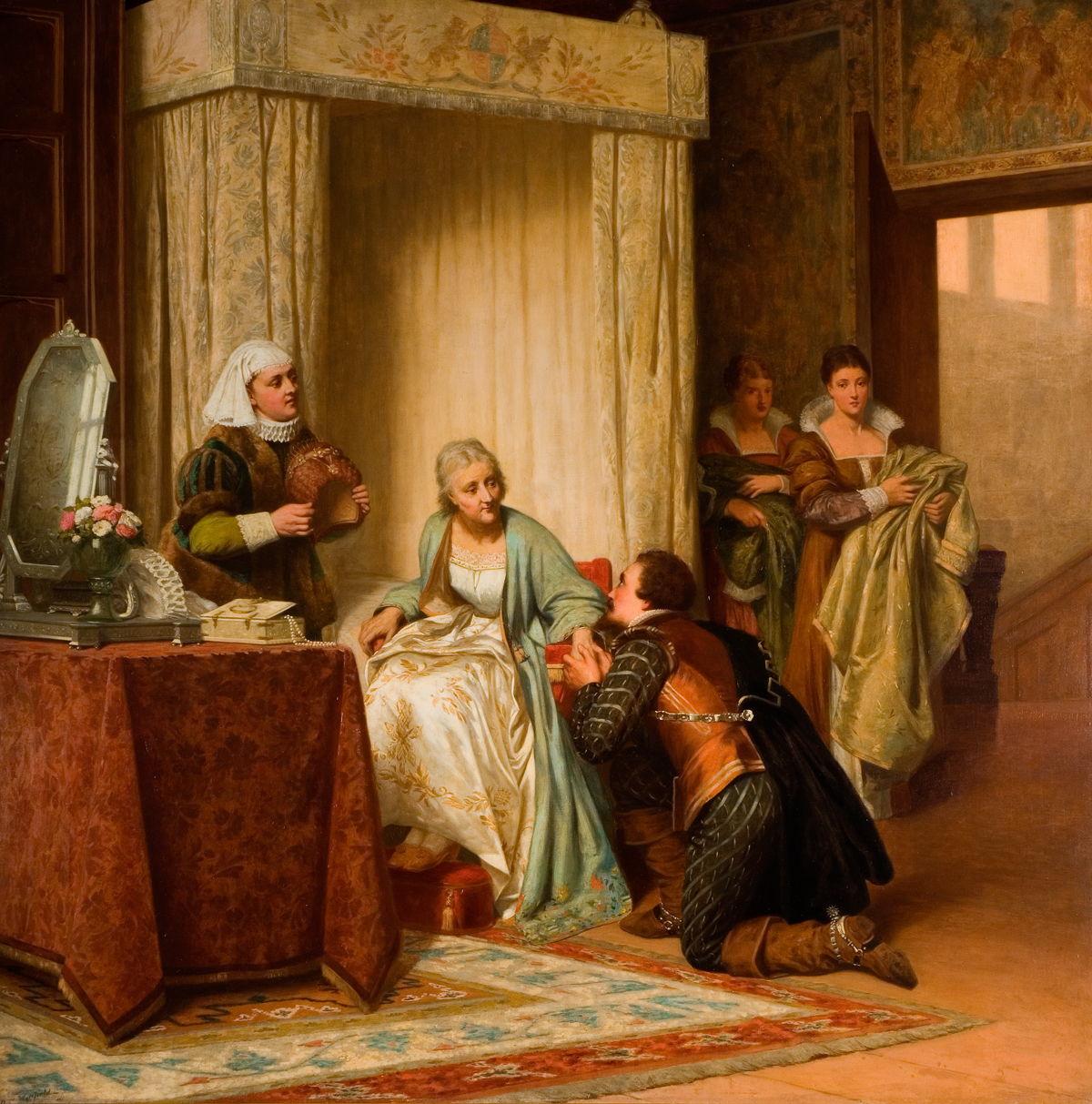
Queen Elizabeth and Essex by David Wilkie Wynfield

Pour les Pauvres by William Frederick Yeames

Summer, Noon by George Vicat Cole

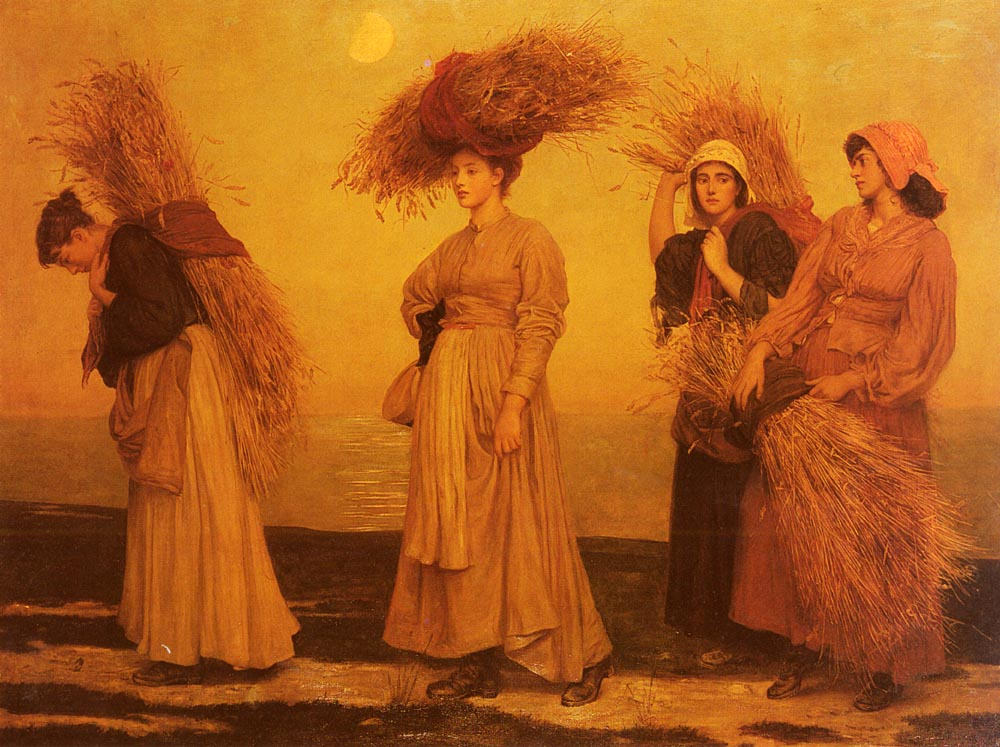
Home from Gleaning by Valentine Cameron Prinsep

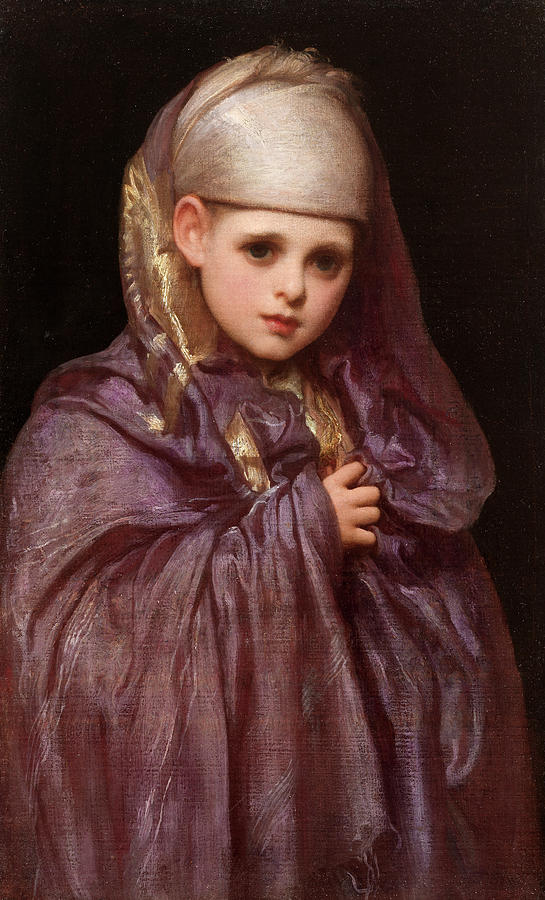
Little Fatima by Frederic Leighton

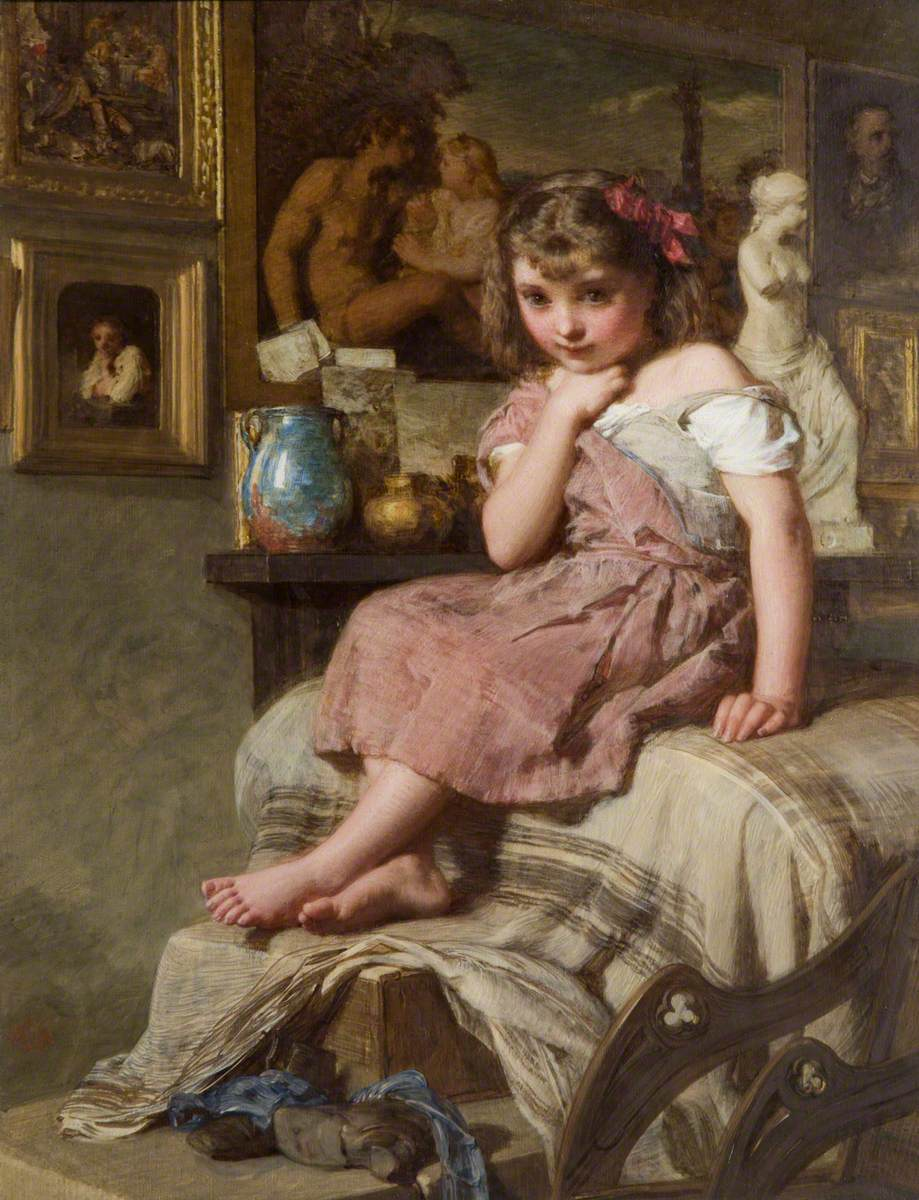
My Little Model by Henry Le Jeune

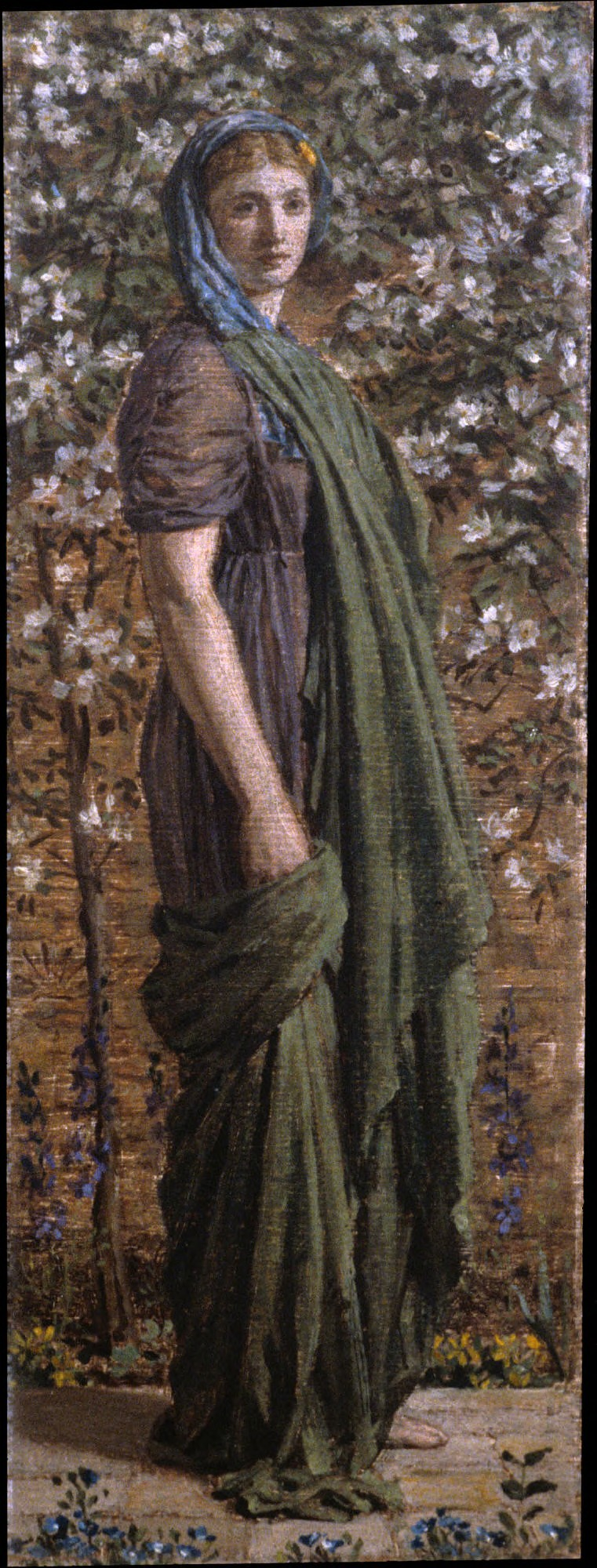
A Flower Walk by Albert Joseph Moore

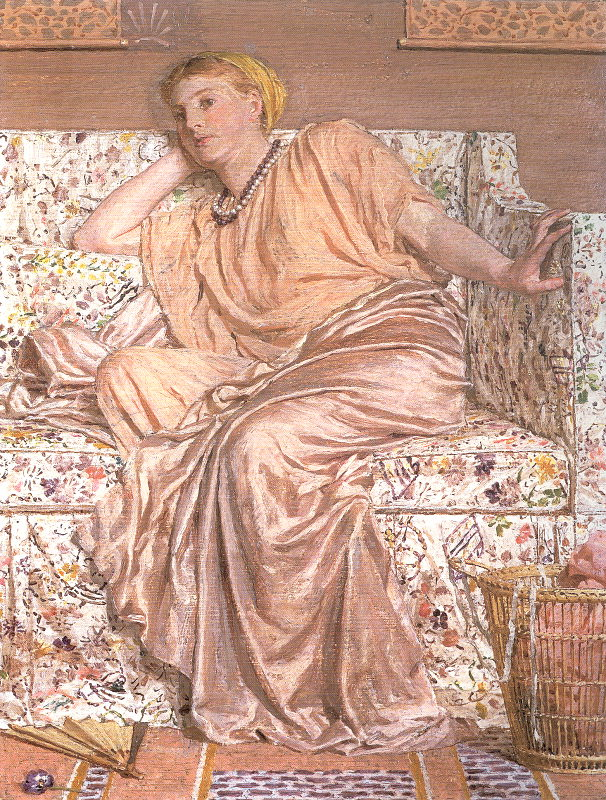
Pansies by Albert Joseph Moore

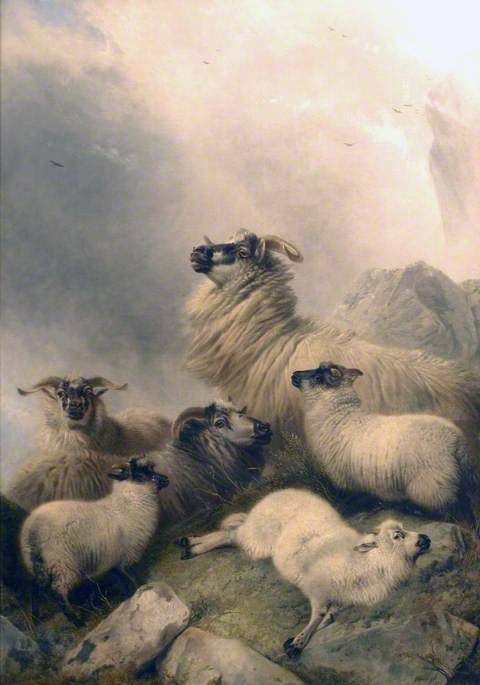
The Anxious Mother by Richard Ansdell

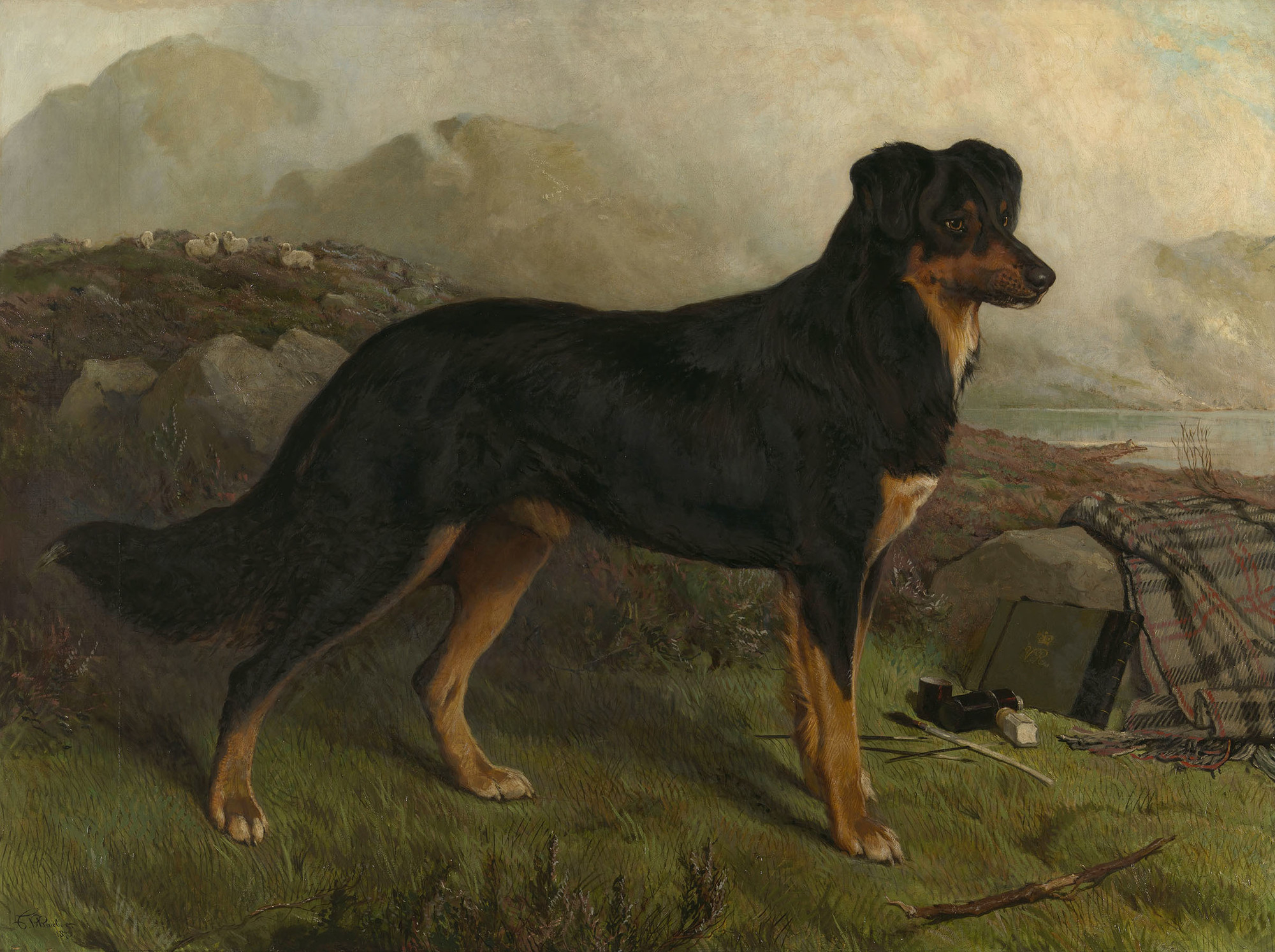
Noble by Charles Burton Barber

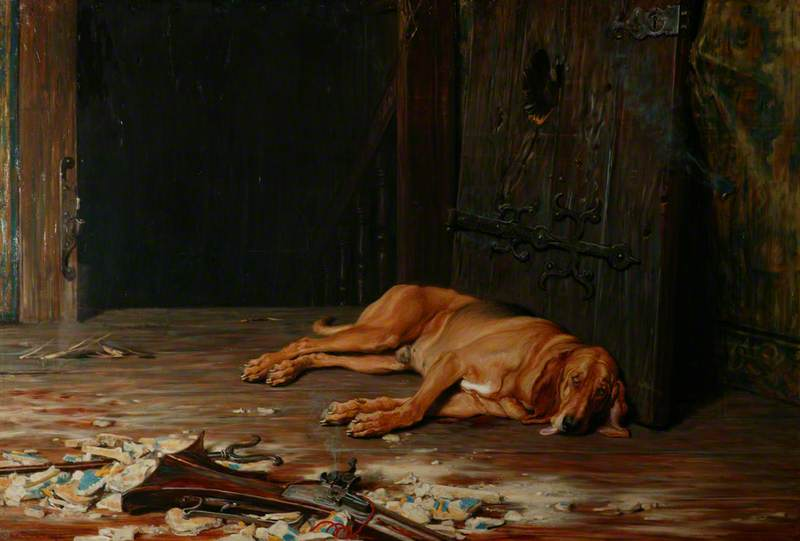
The Last of the Garrison by Briton Riviere

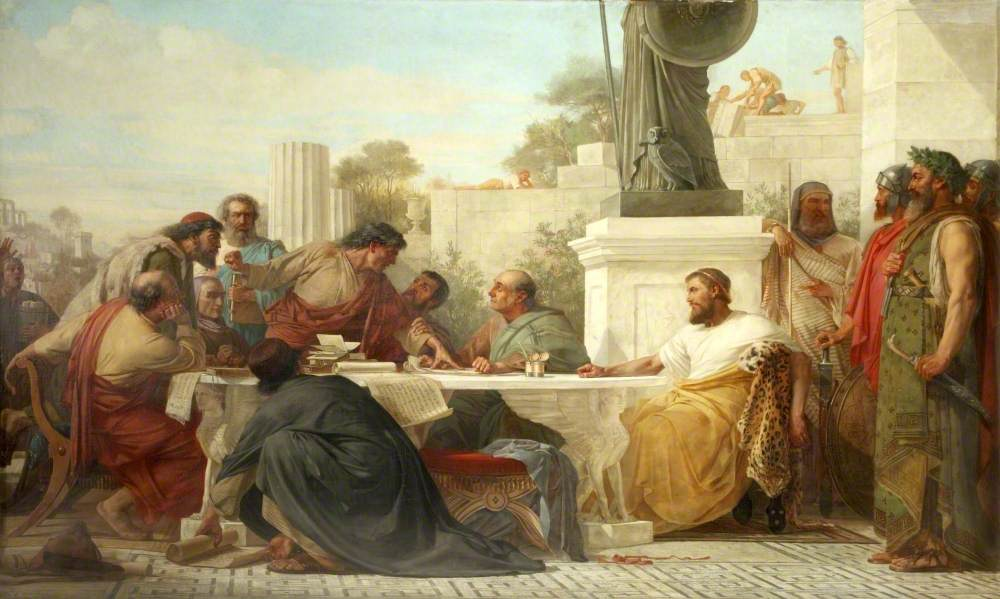
Julian the Apostate Presiding at a Conference of Sectarians by Edward Armitage

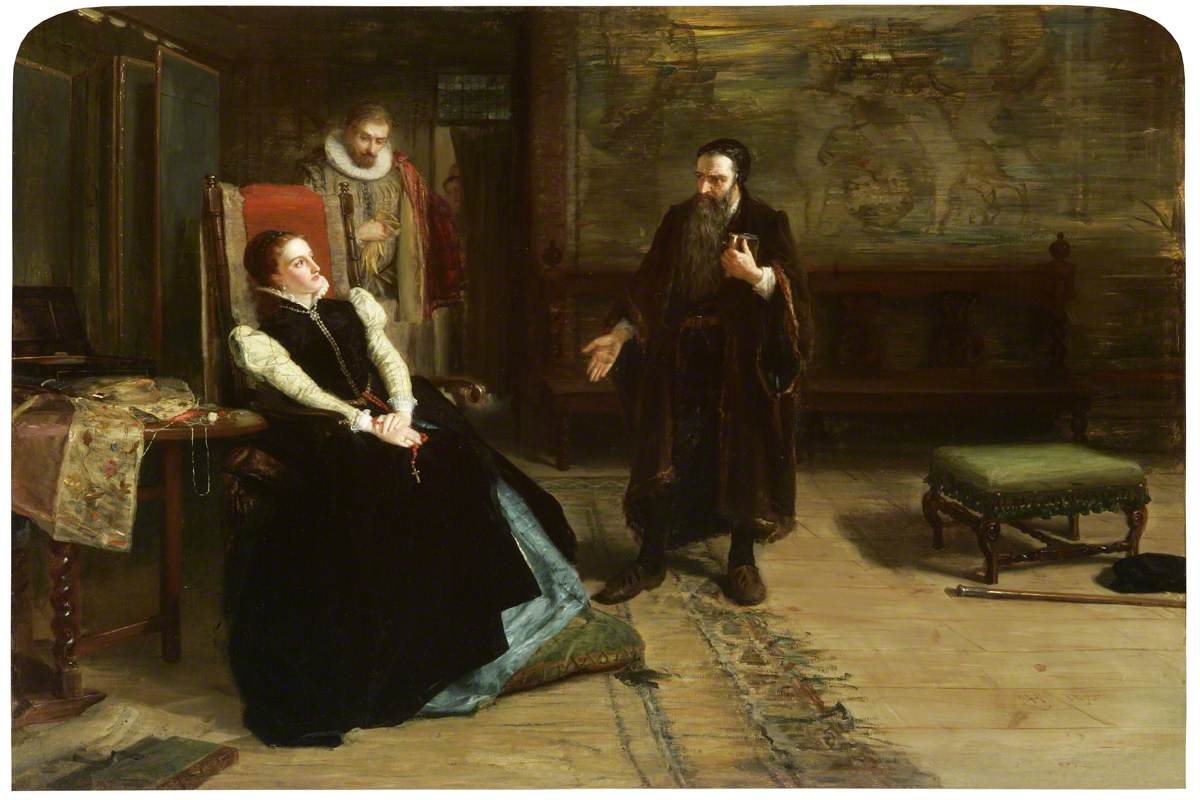
The Conference between Mary, Queen of Scots and John Knox at Holyrood Palace by Robert Herdman

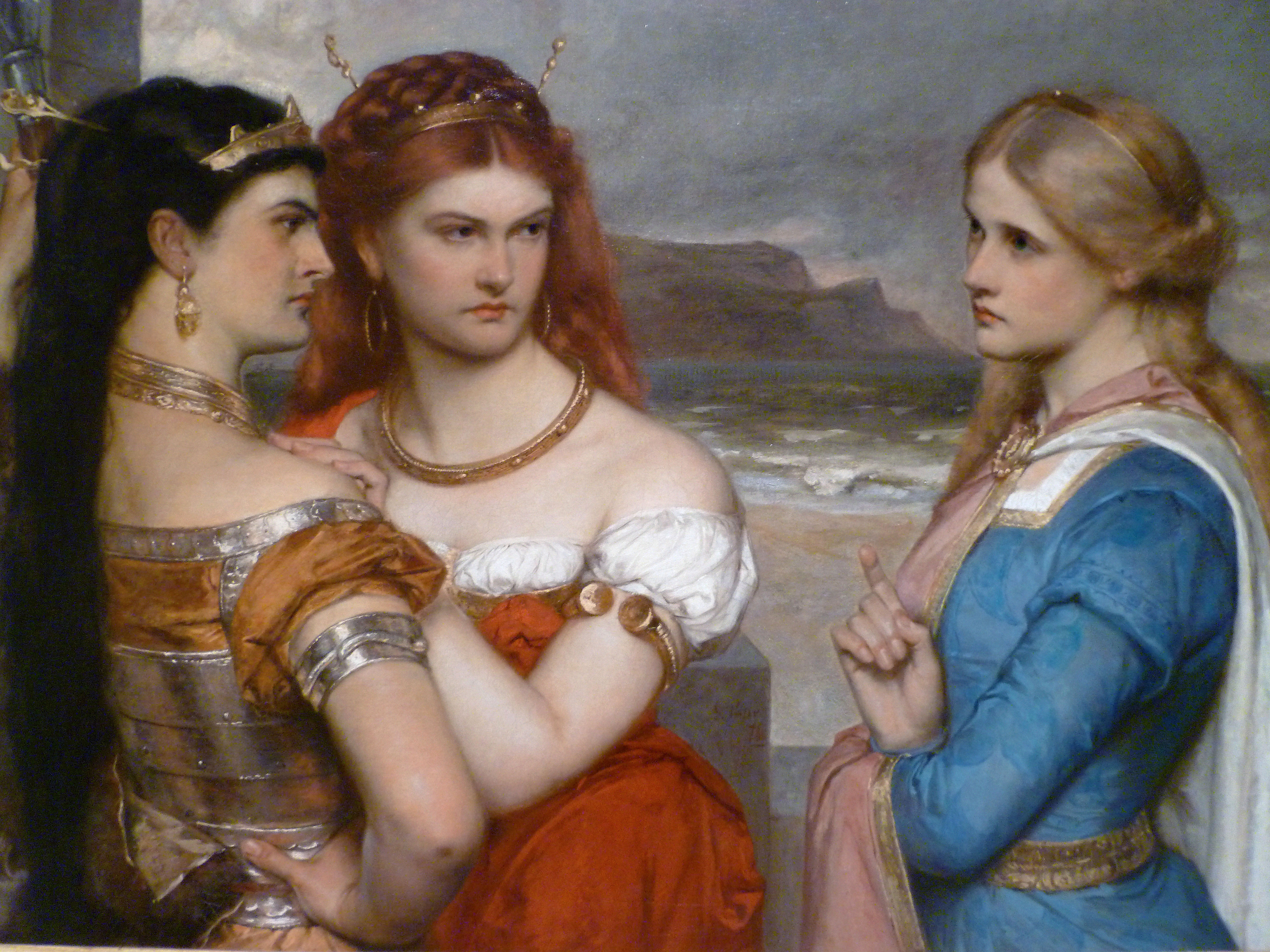
The Three Daughters of King Lear by Gustav Pope

Portrait of John Whyte-Melville by Francis Grant

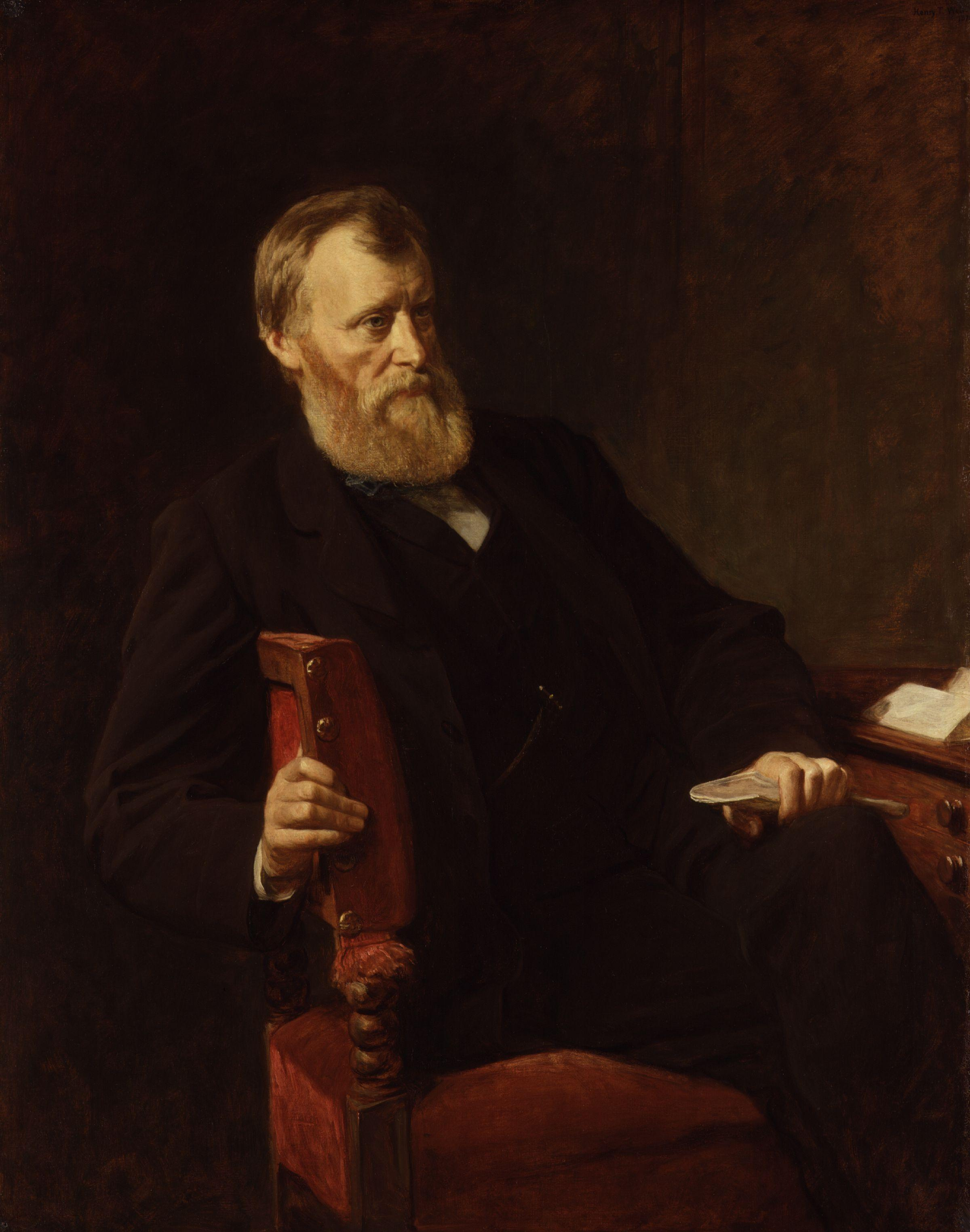
Portrait of William Edward Forster by Henry Tanworth Wells

Portrait of Henry Stacy Marks by Walter William Ouless

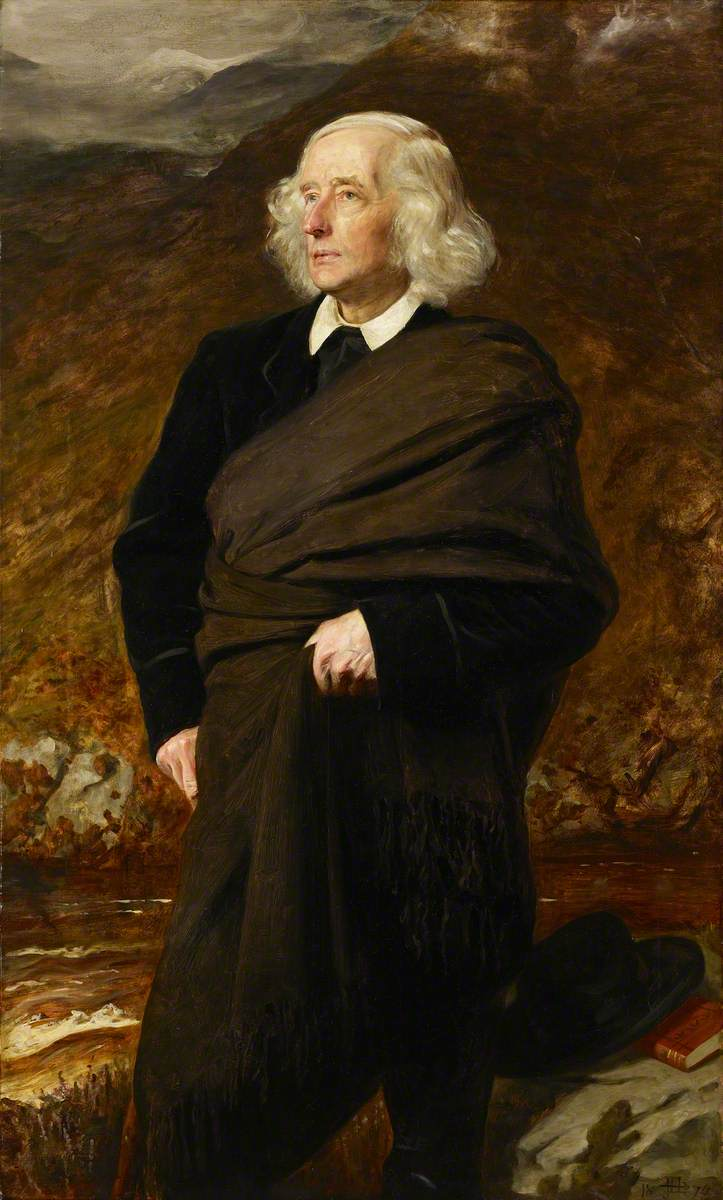
Portrait of John Stuart Blackie by James Archer

Portrait of Eveline Lees by John Everett Millais

Portrait of Gracia Lees by John Everett Millais

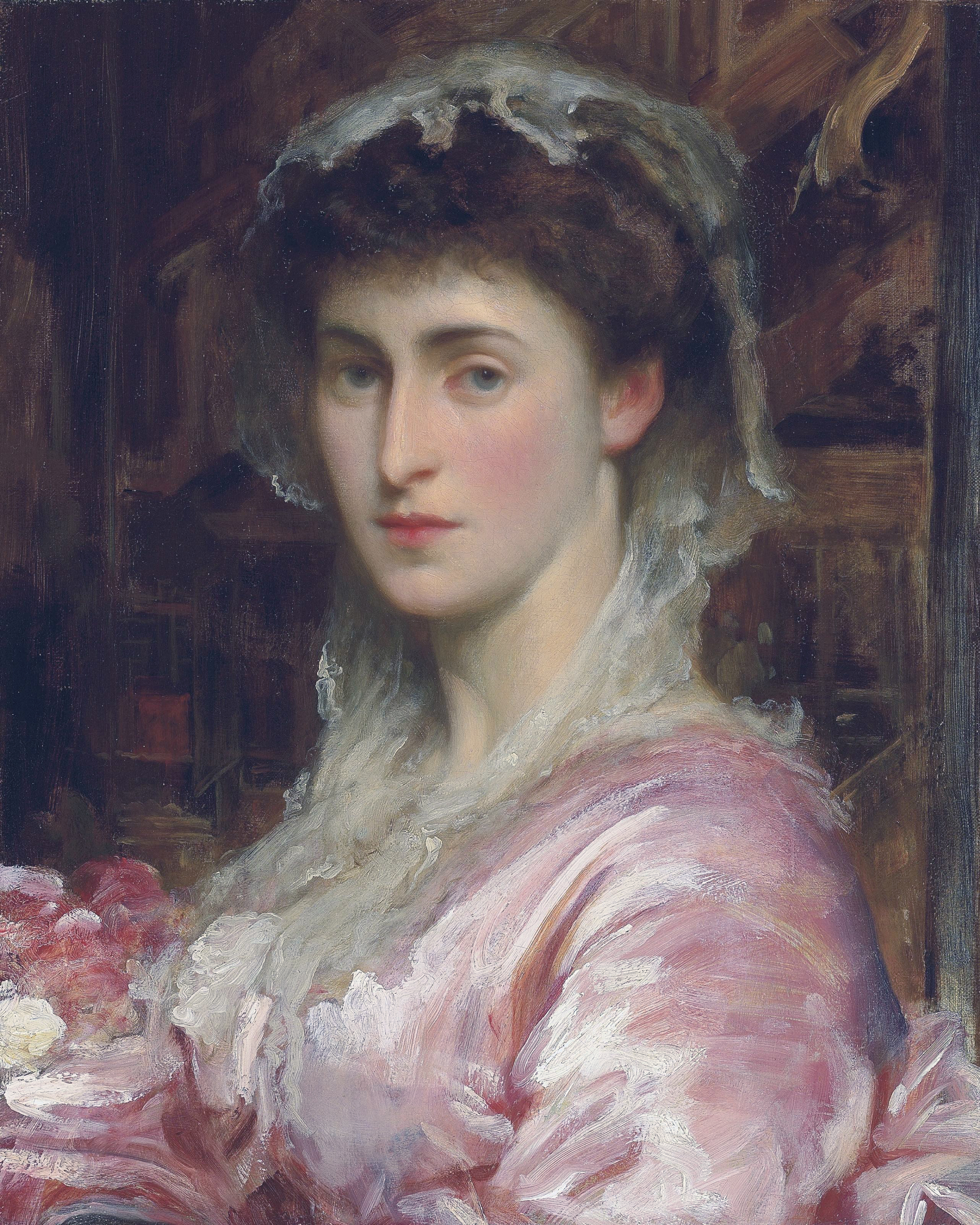
Portrait of Mrs Gordon by Frederic Leighton

Portrait of Moses Montefiore by George Richmond

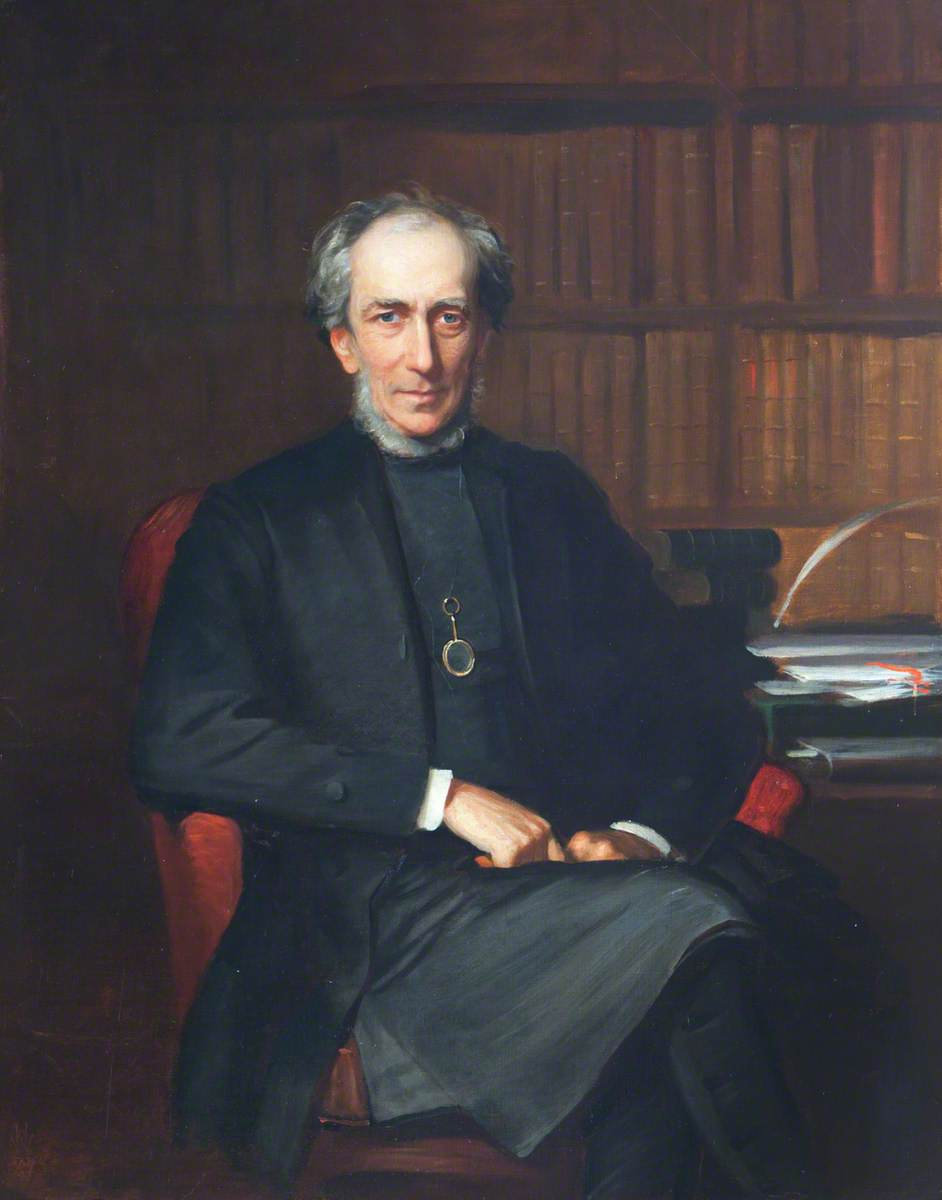
Portrait of Charles Parry by Henry Weigall

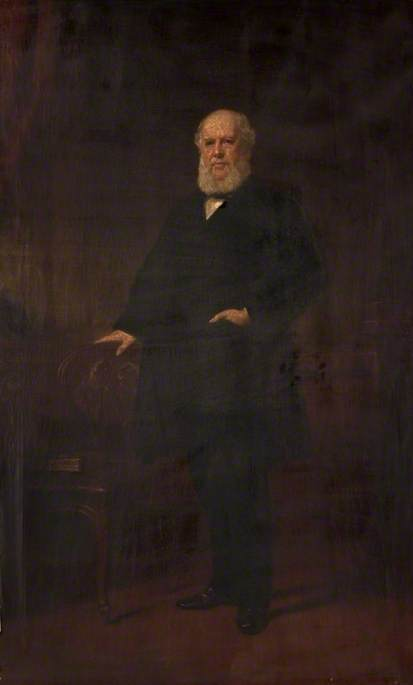
Portrait of Robert Dalglish by Daniel Macnee

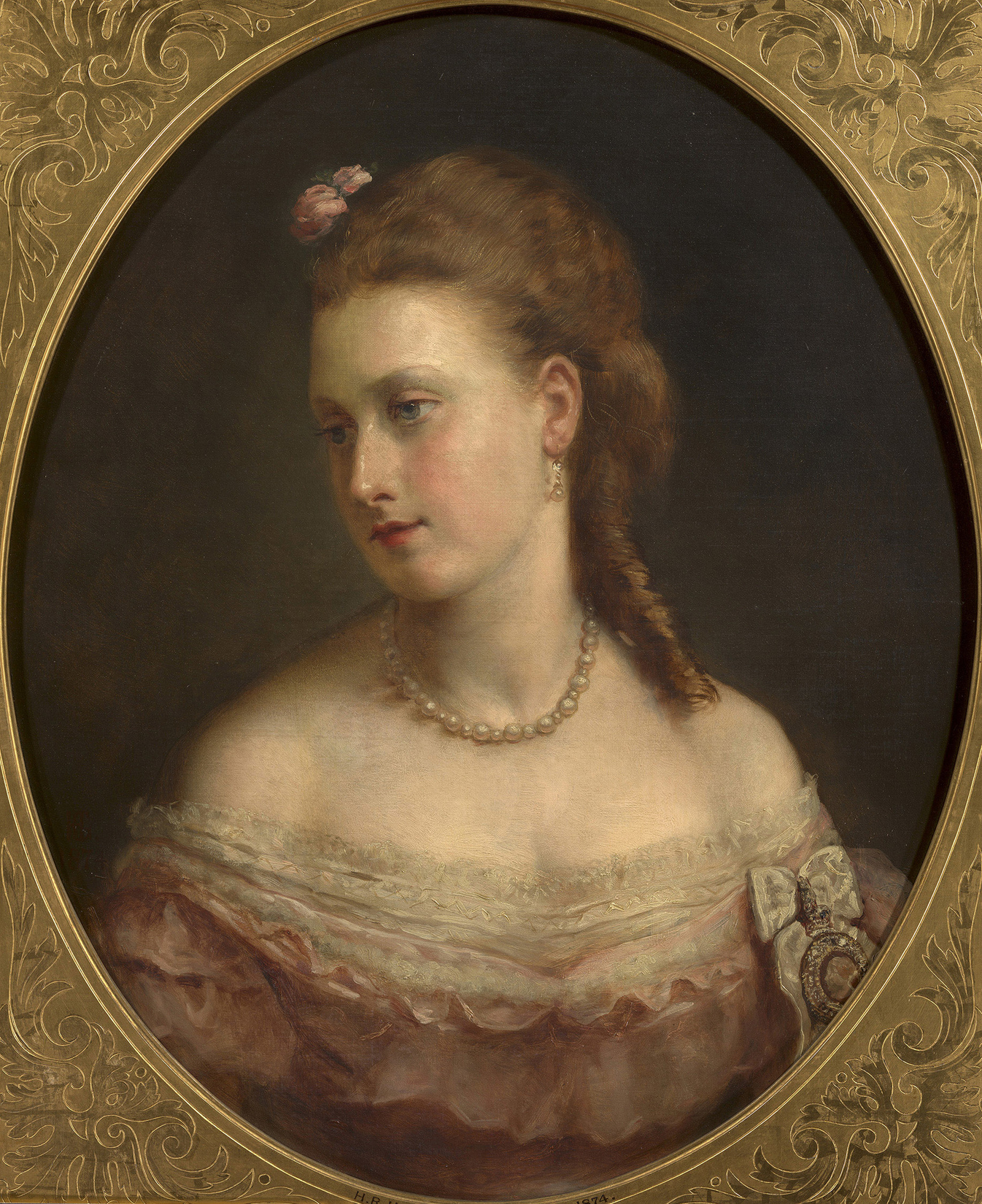
Portrait of Princess Beatrice by Henry Richard Graves

Portrait of Jane Brand by Frederick Sandys

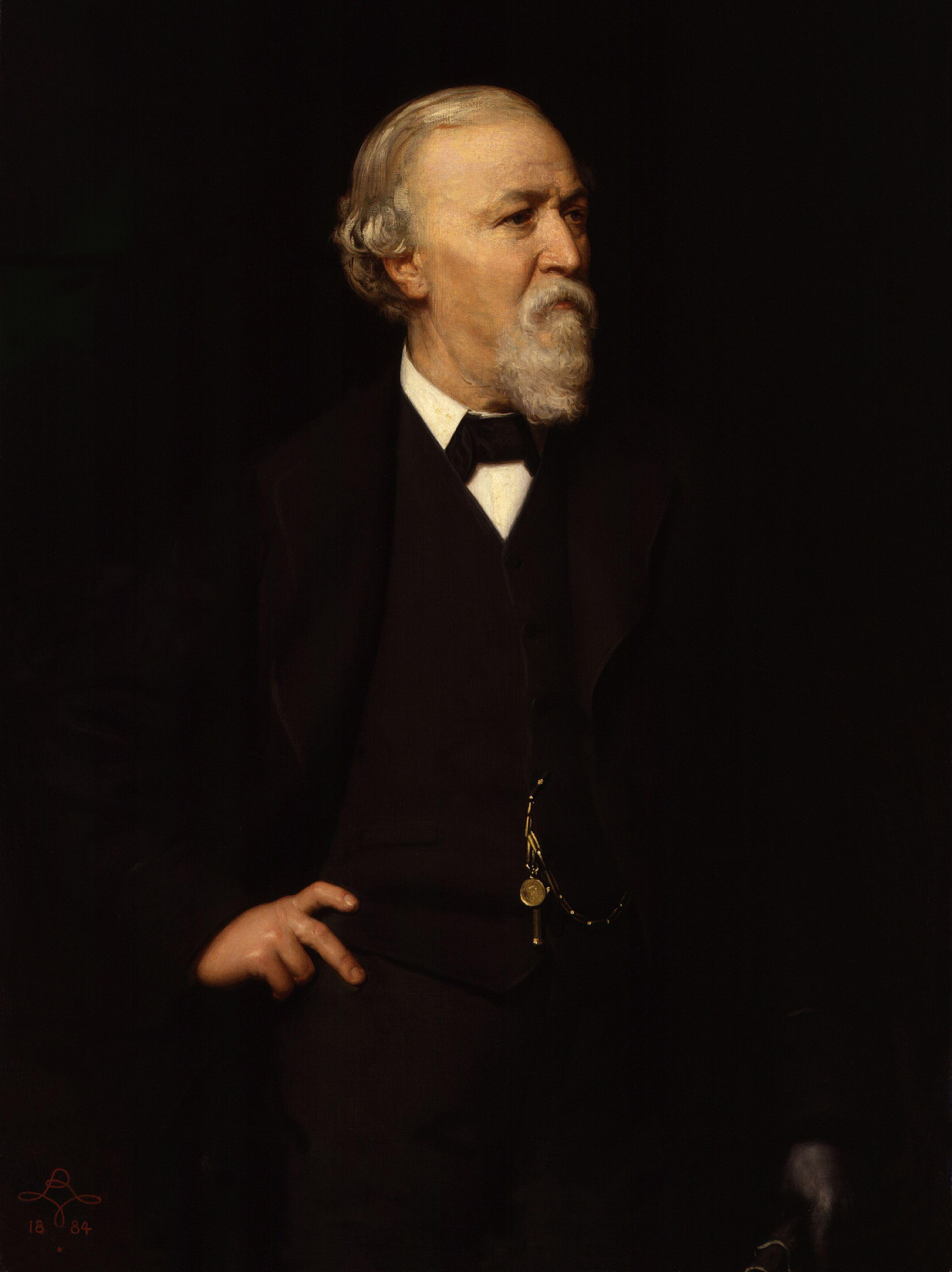
Portrait of Robert Browning by Rudolph Lehmann, a later version of the 1875 painting

== See also ==
- Salon of 1875, a contemporary art exhibition held in Paris

== Bibliography ==
- Armitage, Jill R. Edward Armitage RA: Battles in the Victorian Art World. Troubador Publishing, 2017.
- Marshall, Nancy Rose & Warner, Malcolm. James Tissot: Victorian Life, Modern Love. Yale University Press, 1999.
- Riding, Christine. Tate British Artists: John Everett Millais. Harry N. Abrams, 2006.
