= Patronal festival =

Yearly celebrations held in countries influenced by Christianity

A patronal feast or patronal festival (Note: By definition, a feast is a "day of commemoration set aside for an important personage, such as a saint" while a festival is a "period of celebration often centered around a religious feast day or a holiday." A feast, then, is a one-day celebration focused on its one special personage; the focus of a festival is much wider.) (Spanish: fiesta patronal; Catalan: festa patronal; Portuguese: festa patronal; Italian: festa patronale; French: fête patronale) is a yearly celebration dedicated – in countries influenced by Christianity – to the 'heavenly advocate' or 'patron' of the location holding the festival, who is a saint or virgin. The day of this celebration is called patronal feast day, patronal day or patron day of said location.

Patronal festivals may reflect national holidays (e.g. the feast of Saint George, patron saint of England, Georgia, Bulgaria, Romania, Portugal, and various regions (Note: Catalonia, Aragon, and other areas; see Saint George's Day (Spain).) of Spain), but they usually reflect the celebration of a single city or town. In larger cities, there may even be several festivals, usually about the patron saint of the local parish.

== Celebration ==
Depending on the budget and tradition, patronal festivals may typically run from one day to one week, though some festivals may exceed that length. The festivities usually include religious processions honoring its Catholic heritage. However, elements of local culture have been incorporated as well.

Usually, town members adorn the town streets with colorful decorations and other things.

Most patronal festivals feature traditional fairs known as verbenas (Italian: sagra, plural: sagre), possibly including elements typical of the travelling carnivals. They feature parades, artisans, street vendors, regional food stands, amusement rides, games, and live entertainment, among other things. There are usually alcoholic beverages – wine and beer – and music and dancing, either organized or spontaneously; in Southern Italy and Argentina, for example, folk dances known as tarantellas are very common.

=== In Europe ===
==== Italy ====
The Italian national patronal day, on 4 October, celebrates Saints Francis and Catherine. Each city or town also celebrates a public holiday on the occasion of the festival of the local patron saint, for example: Rome on 29 June (Saints Peter and Paul), Milan on 7 December (Saint Ambrose), Naples on 19 September (Saint Januarius), Venice on 25 April (Saint Mark the Evangelist) and Florence on 24 June (Saint John the Baptist). Notable traditional patronal festivals in Italy are the Feast of Saints Francis and Catherine, the Festival of Saint Agatha, the Feast of Saints Peter and Paul, the Feast of San Gennaro and the Feast of Our Lady of the Hens.

Examples

- Feast of Our Lady of the Hens on the Second Sunday of Easter in Pagani, Campania
- Feast of Saints Francis and Catherine
- Feast of San Gennaro

==== Spain ====
Examples

- Fiestas del Pilar around 12 October in Zaragoza
- La Mercè around 24 September in Barcelona
- Fallas, with main events from 15 until 19 March (Saint Joseph's day), but including pyrotechnic spectacles every day from 1 to 19 March
- Bonfires of Saint John around 24 June in Alicante
- Festival of San Fermín around 7 July in Pamplona, actually spanning from 6 July to 14 July
- San Isidro Labrador around 15 May in rural areas mostly in Extremadura and Andalusia, but also in Madrid.

=== In Latin America ===
==== Puerto Rico ====
Most Latin American countries dedicate the first day to the saint or virgin being celebrated, the others to entertainment, but in the US territory of Puerto Rico the musical and entertainment festivities begin right away.

=== In Asia ===
==== Philippines ====
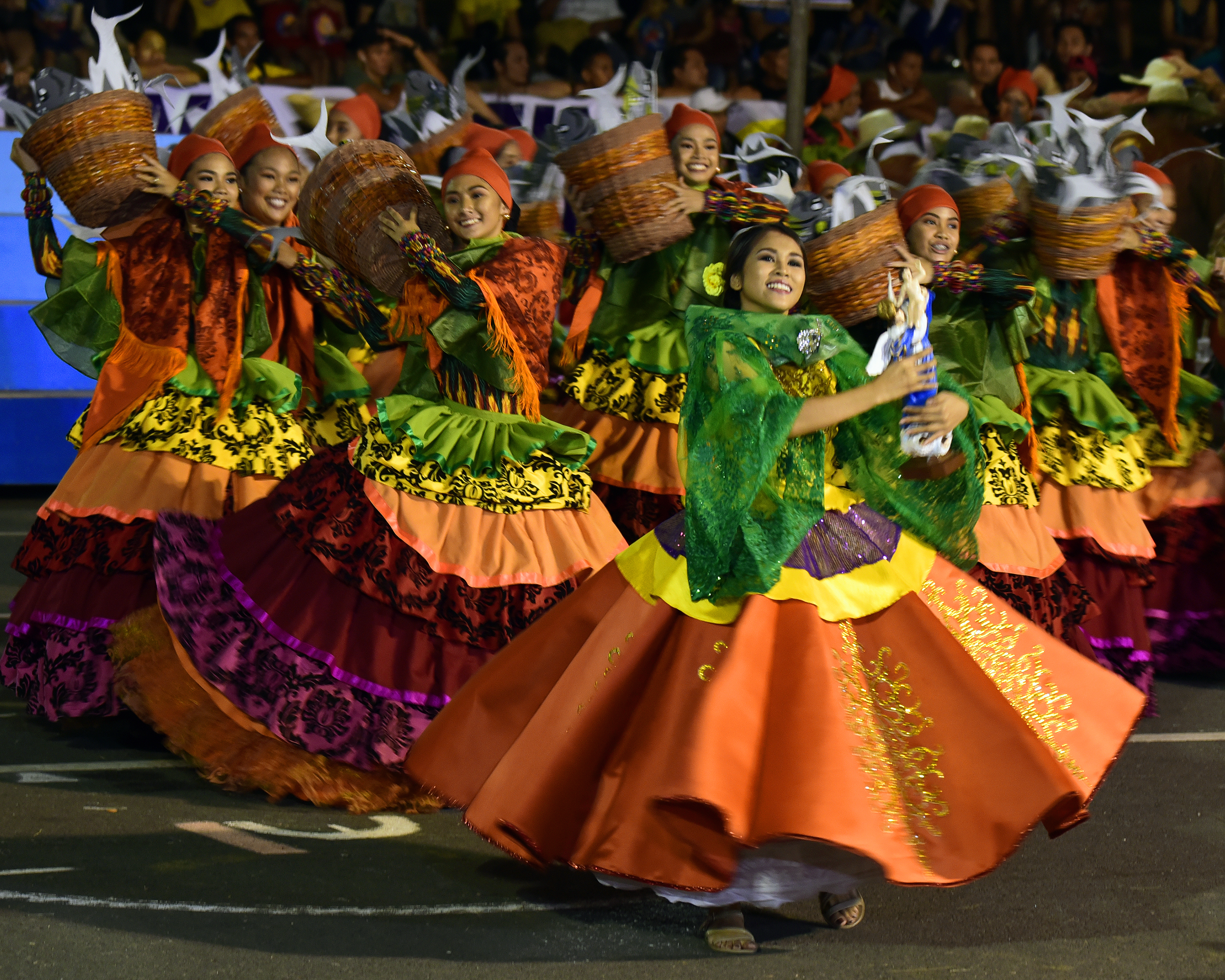
Street dancers in the Tagultol Festival of Atimonan, Quezon, Philippines. Note the lead performer holding a figurine of Nuestra Señora de los Angeles, the patron saint of the town.

In addition to major secular festivals and national religious holidays, nearly every city, town, and barangay in the Philippines, regardless of size, has an annual Catholic patronal festival known as a fiesta (Tagalog: pyesta). Many of which date back to the Spanish colonial period. A fiesta celebrates the patron saint of the community and commonly features a Catholic mass, communal feasts, traveling carnivals, fairs, parades, competitions, outdoor dancing, and other events. Locals would open their houses and offer meals, even to strangers. The streets are also typically decked with colorful banderitas and other decorations.

== Further examples ==
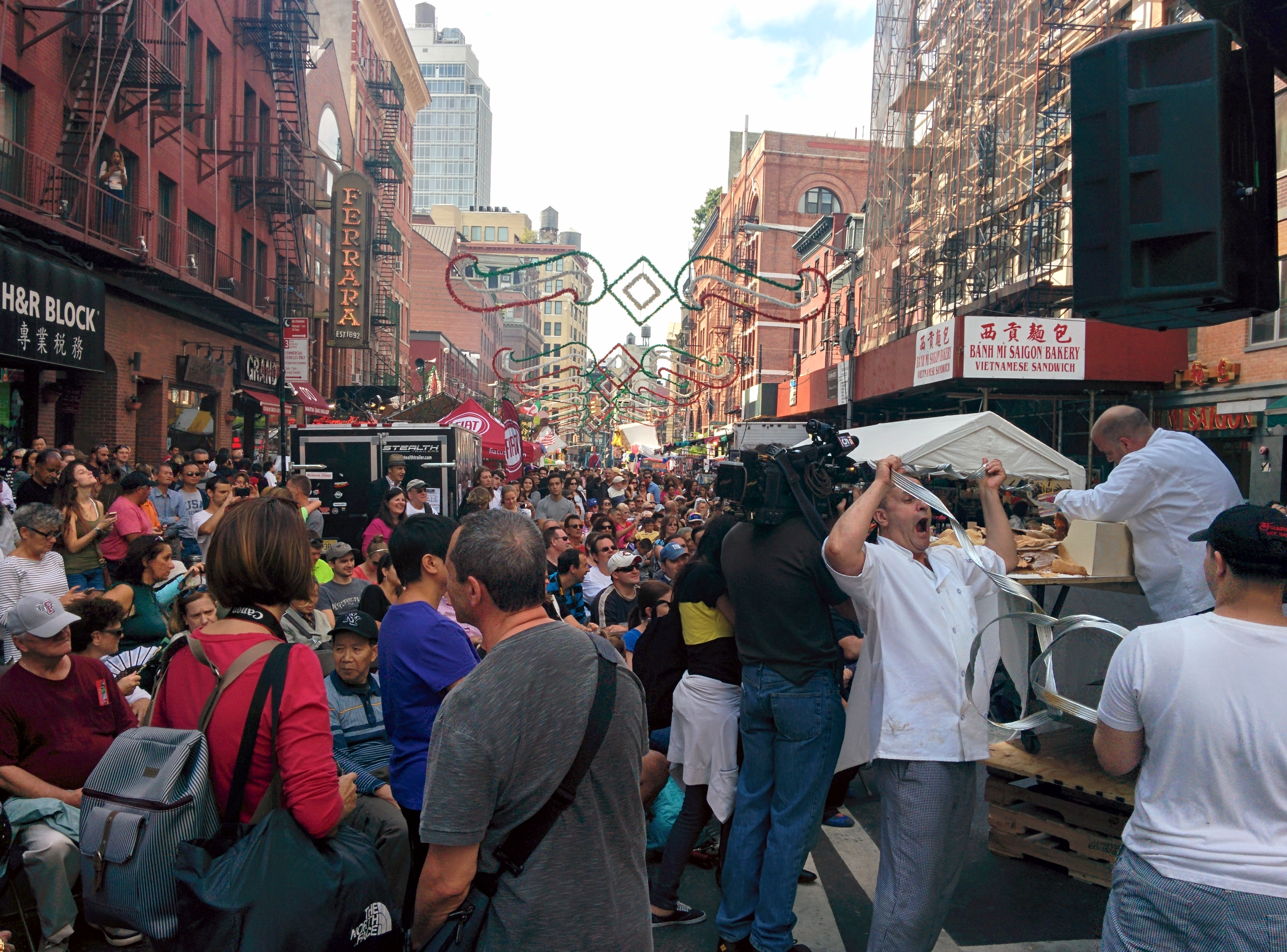
Feast of San Gennaro in Little Italy, New York

- Feast of Saint Francis of Assisi on 4 October, in Yucuaquín (El Salvador), in Somerville, Massachusetts (US) and in Italy
- Festa de São João do Porto around 23 June in Porto (Portugal)

=== Serbia ===
In Serbian culture, instead of local patron saints, people celebrate family's patron saints. These celebrations are known as 'slava' in Serbia.

== See also ==
- Kermesse (festival)
- Calendar of saints
- Christian culture
- Civil religion
- Holyday
- Patron saints of places
- Patronages of the Immaculate Conception
