= Shop Girl =

Shop Girl may refer to:

- Shopgirl (2005), American romantic comedy drama film directed by Anand Tucker
- The Shop Girl, musical comedy in two acts written by H. J. W. Dam
- The Shop Girl (Tissot), a painting by James Tissot in the collection of the Art Gallery of Ontario
- "Shop Girl", a season 3 episode of The Loud House

== See also ==
- Shopgirls
