= Holyday (Tissot) =

Painting by James Tissot

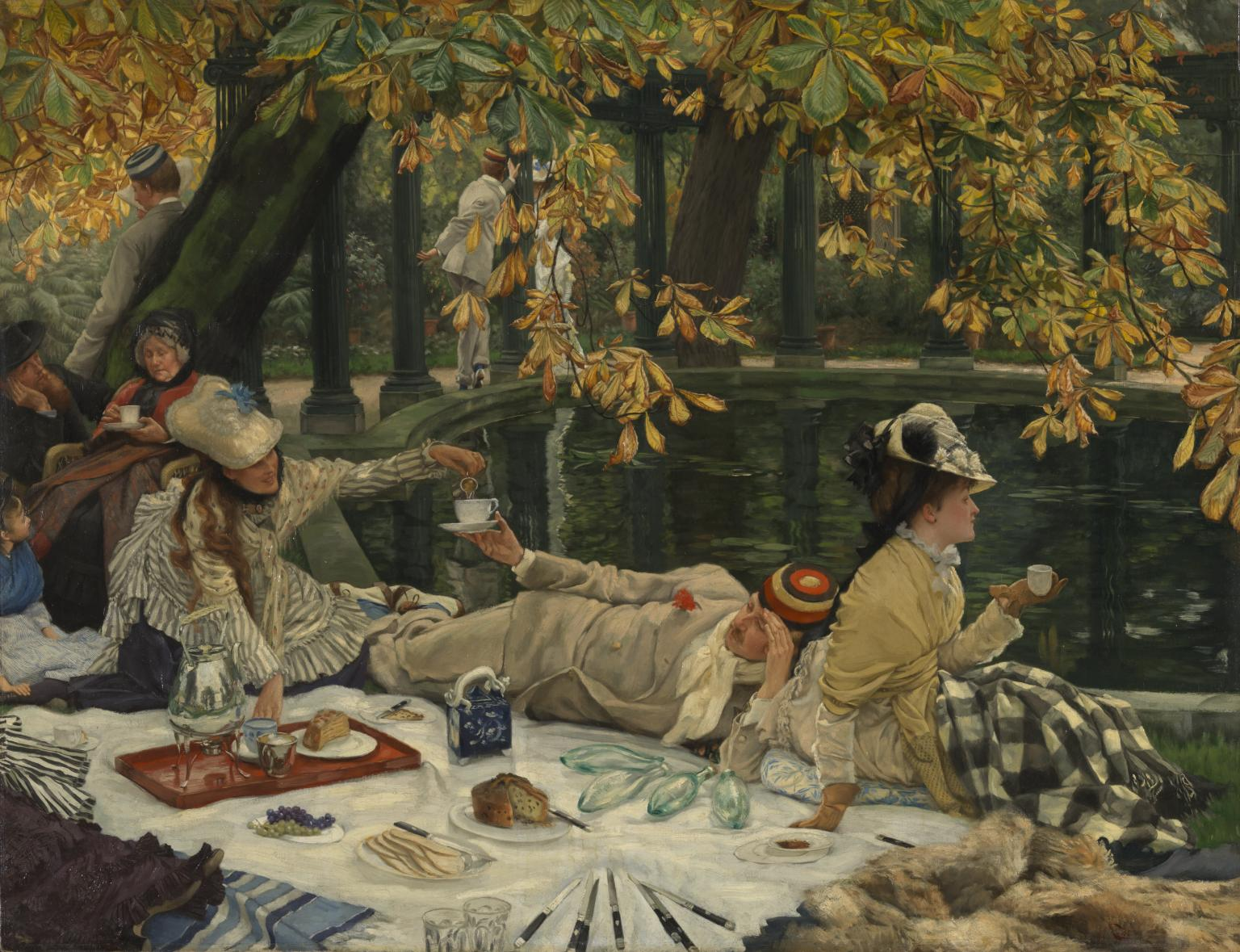
- Artist: James Tissot
- Year: circa 1876
- Medium: Oil on canvas
- Dimensions: 76.2 cm × 99.4 cm (30.0 in × 39.1 in)
- Location: Tate Gallery, London

Holyday, later also known as The Picnic, is an oil painting by French painter James Tissot (1836–1902), painted in 1876. The composition is set in the artist’s garden in the wealthy north London suburb of St John’s Wood. Tissot moved to England in the year 1871, when he was thirty five and settled there. Before moving to London, Tissot was a successful painter of Paris society.

The painting shows a group of elegantly dressed men and women during a picnic at the pond in the painter's garden. The painting is characterized by the attention to detail and vivid colours. Holyday is held in London's Tate Gallery.

== Description ==
Holyday was painted in the back garden of Tissot's London home, near the Lord's Cricket Ground. Autumn is coming, the leaves of the large chestnut tree are changing color, but the rest of the vegetation is still green and luxurious. The low sun shines a bright afternoon light on the scene. On the right is the painter's muse and lover, Kathleen Newton, who appears to avert her eyes from the scene. The men in the painting belong to the well-known I Zingari cricket club, judging by their yellow, red and black hats. The women are overdressed; a typical Tissot idiosyncrasy.

Stylistically, Holyday is striking because of its crystal-clear representation. The work is hyperrealistic and greatly detailed, with sparkling colors. The focus on daily scenes comes from Impressionism, which was en vogue in the Paris of those days. The influence of Manet can be recognized, also in the choice of subject, reminiscent of his Le déjeuner sur l'herbe (The Luncheon on the Grass). However, Holyday does not provoke but is suffused with a British conservatism.

== History ==
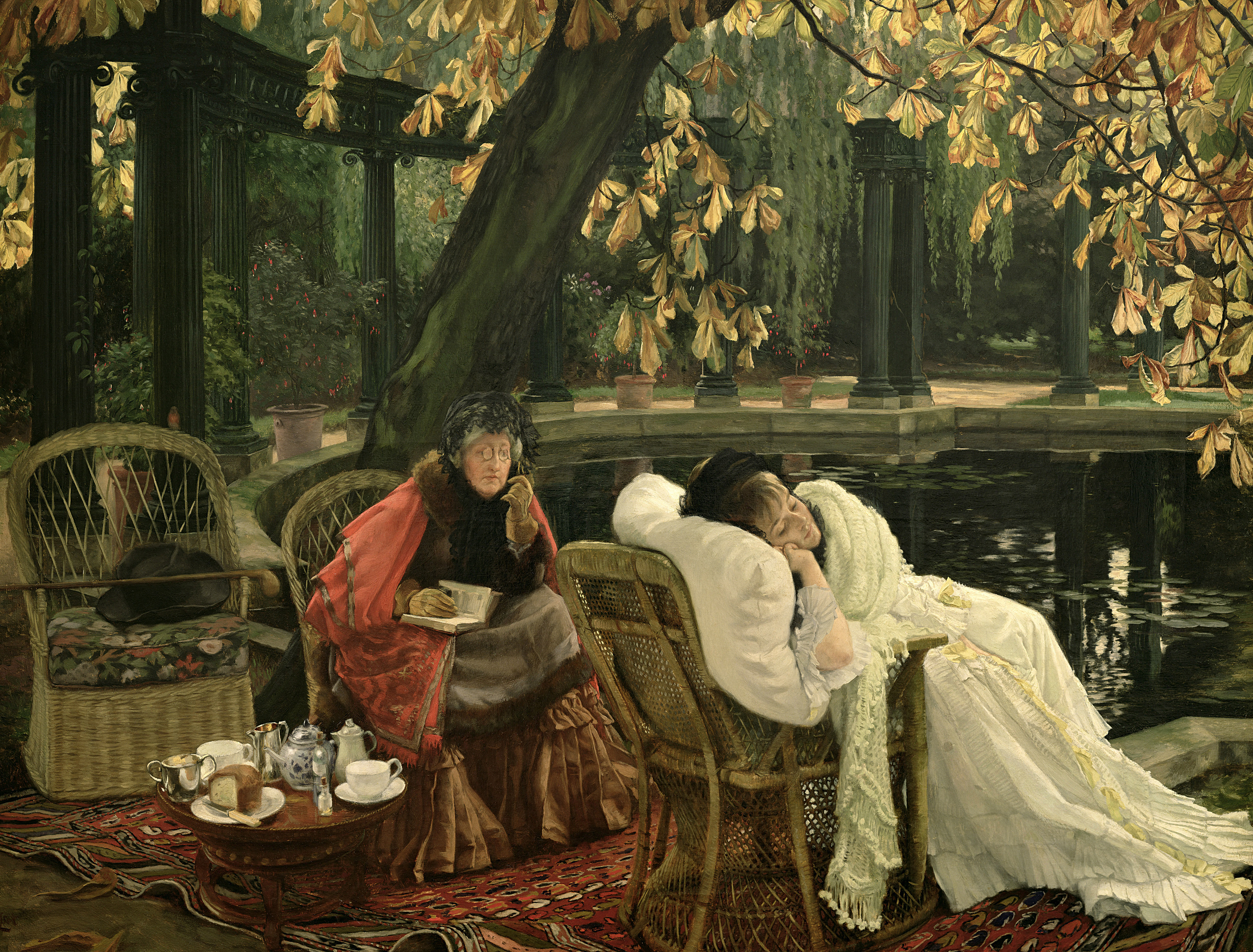
The Convalescent, c. 1876

Tissot's Holyday was shown at the Grosvenor Gallery Exhibition of 1877 in London as a pendant for The Convalescent, which was also painted in his yard. He made studies for both paintings in a single sketchbook. He probably intended the two to be a diptych, though they were quickly separated when sold and never exhibited together afterward. A Convalescent is in the Manchester Art Gallery; Holyday was acquired by the Tate Gallery in 1928.
