= James Tissot =

French painter and illustrator (1836–1902)

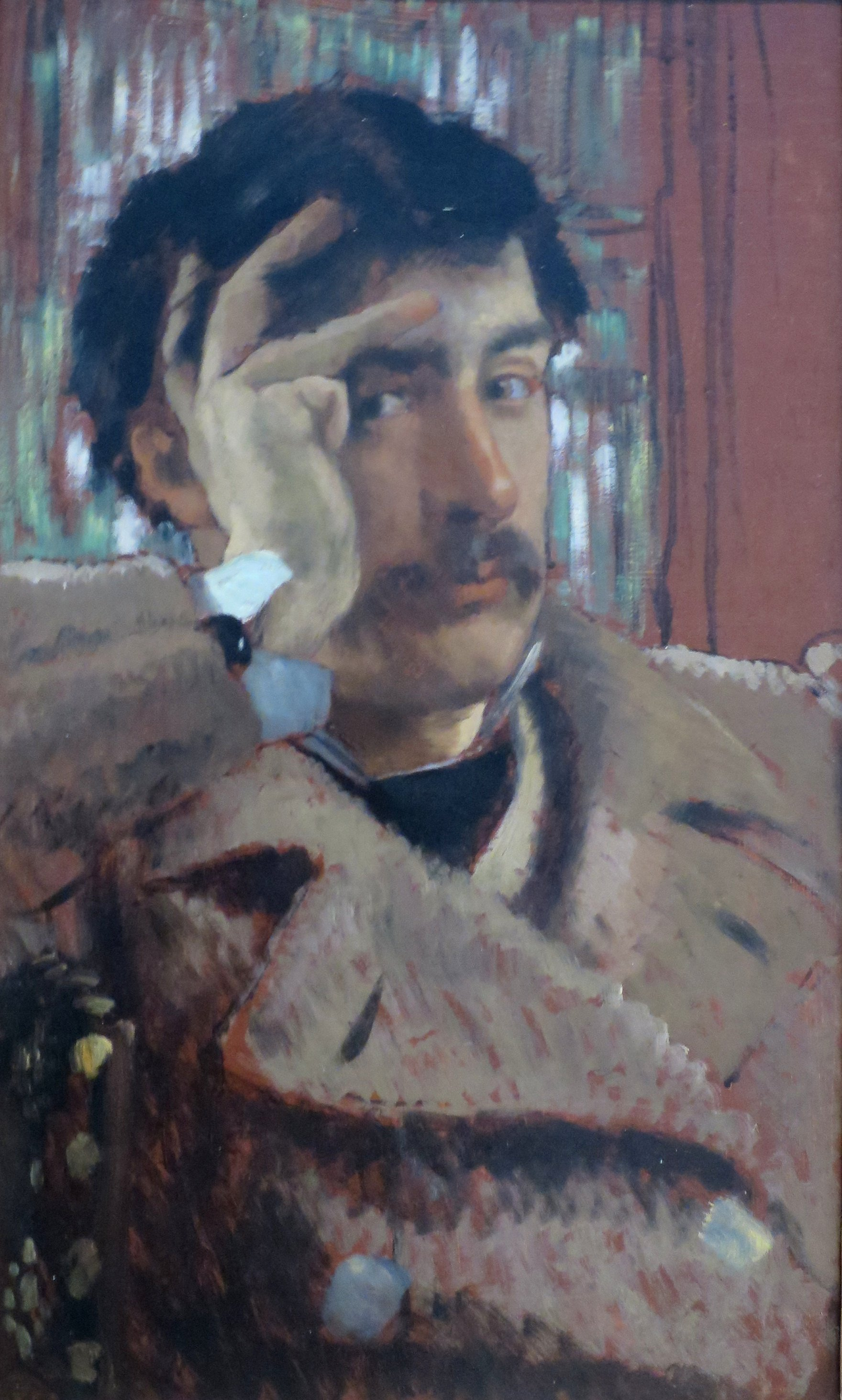
- Self-portrait, 1865
- Born: Jacques Joseph Tissot; 15 October 1836; Nantes, Kingdom of France
- Died: 8 August 1902 (aged 65); Chenecey-Buillon, French Republic
- Occupations: Painter; illustrator; artist

Jacques Joseph Tissot (French: [ʒɑk ʒozɛf tiso]; 15 October 1836 – 8 August 1902), better known as James Tissot (UK: /ˈtɪsoʊ/ TISS-oh, US: /tiːˈsoʊ/ tee-SOH), was a French painter, illustrator, and caricaturist. He was born to a drapery merchant and a milliner and decided to pursue a career in art at a young age, coming to incorporate elements of realism, early Impressionism, and academic art into his work. He is best known for a variety of genre paintings of contemporary European high society produced during the peak of his career, which focused on the people and women's fashion of the Belle Époque and Victorian England, but he would also explore many medieval, biblical, and Japoniste subjects throughout his life. His career included work as a caricaturist for Vanity Fair under the pseudonym of Coïdé.

Tissot served in the Franco-Prussian War on the side of France and later the Paris Commune. In 1871 he moved to London, where he found further success as an artist and began a relationship with Irishwoman Kathleen Newton, who lived with him as a close companion and muse until her death in 1882. Tissot maintained close relations with the Impressionist movement for much of his life, including James Abbott Whistler and friend and protégé Edgar Degas. He was awarded the French Legion of Honor in 1894.

== Early life ==
Jacques Tissot was born in the city of Nantes in France and spent his early childhood there. His father, Marcel Théodore Tissot, was a successful drapery merchant. His mother, Marie Durand, assisted her husband in the family business and designed hats. A devout Catholic, Tissot's mother instilled pious devotion in the future artist from a very young age. Tissot's youth spent in Nantes likely contributed to his frequent depiction of shipping vessels and boats in his later works. The involvement of his parents in the fashion industry is believed to have been an influence on his painting style, as he depicted women's clothing in fine detail. By the time Tissot was 17, he knew he wanted to pursue painting as a career. His father opposed this, preferring his son to follow a business profession, but the young Tissot gained his mother's support for his chosen vocation. Around this time, he began using the given name of James as an Anglicisation, becoming commonly known as James Tissot by 1854; he may have adopted it because of his increasing interest in everything English.

== Artistic debut ==
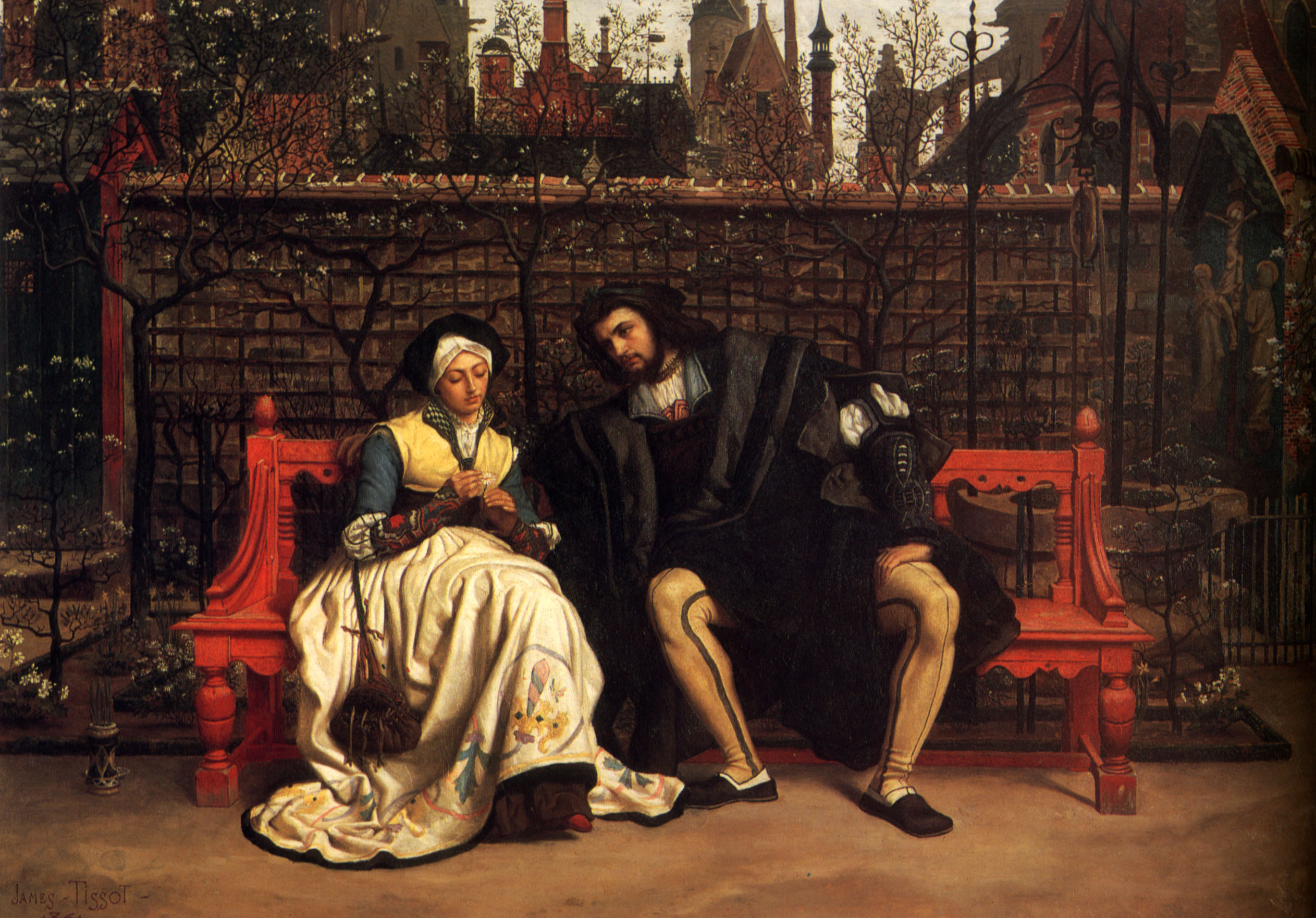
Faust and Marguerite in the Garden, 1861

In 1856 or 1857, Tissot travelled to Paris to pursue an education in art. While staying with a friend of his mother, painter Jules-Élie Delaunay, Tissot enrolled at the Ecole des Beaux-Arts to study in the studios of Hippolyte Flandrin and Louis Lamothe; Both were successful Lyonnaise painters who moved to Paris to study under Jean-Auguste-Dominique Ingres. Around this time, Tissot also made the acquaintance of the American James McNeill Whistler, and French painters Edgar Degas (who had also been a student of Lamothe and a friend of Delaunay), and Édouard Manet.

In 1859, Tissot exhibited in the Paris Salon for the first time. He showed five paintings of scenes from the Middle Ages, many depicting scenes from Goethe's Faust. These works show the influence in his work of the Belgian painter Henri Leys, whom Tissot had met in Antwerp earlier that same year. Other influences include the works of the German painters Peter von Cornelius and Moritz Retzsch. After Tissot had first exhibited at the Salon and before he had been awarded a medal, the French government paid 5,000 francs for his depiction of The Meeting of Faust and Marguerite in 1860. The painting went on to be exhibited at the Salon the following year, together with a portrait and several other paintings.

Émile Péreire supplied Tissot's painting Walk in the Snow for the 1862 international exhibition in London; the next year three paintings by Tissot were displayed at the gallery of art dealer Ernest Gambart in London.

== Mature life and career ==
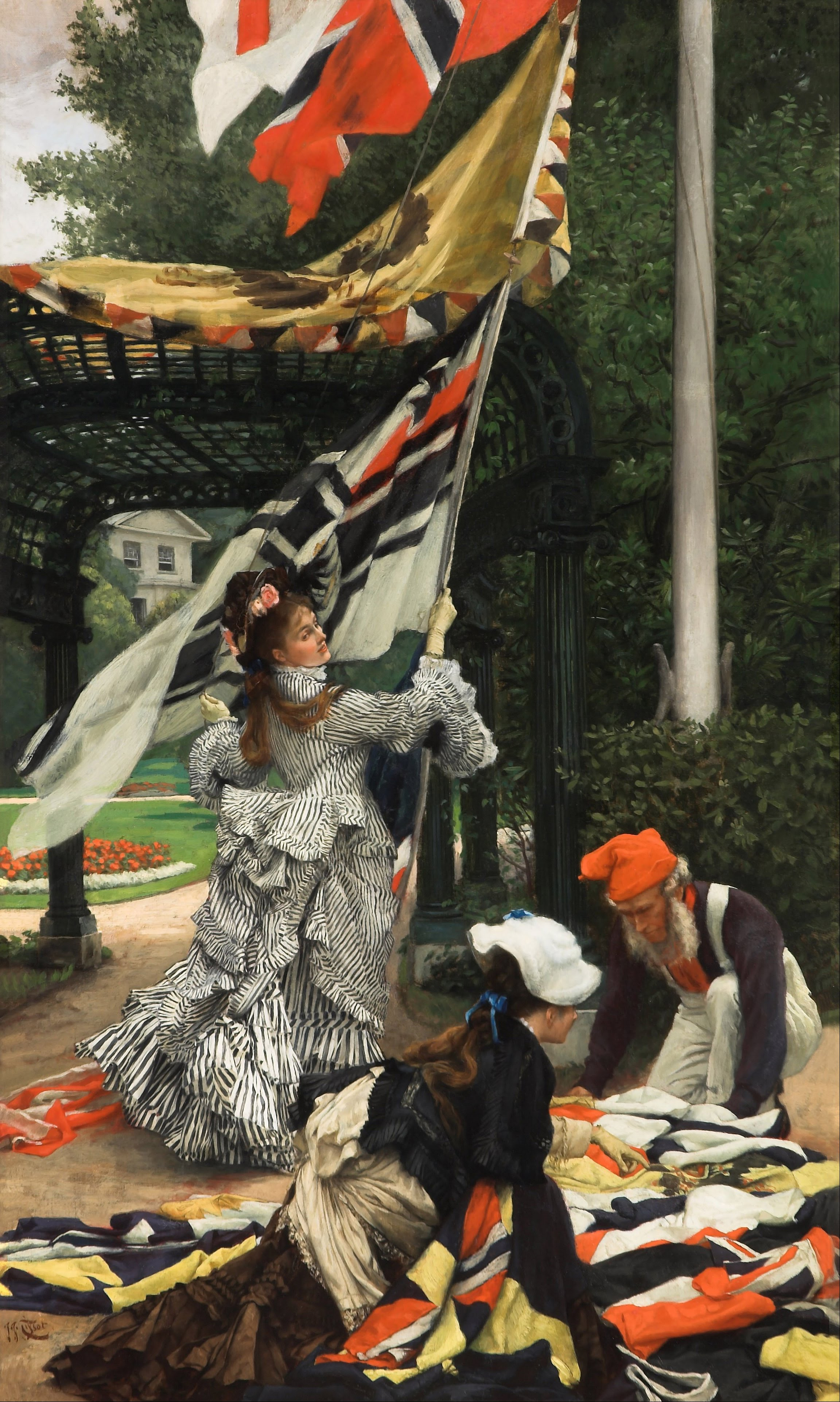
Still on Top, c. 1873. Note the two lower figures wearing a red Communard cap and a Japanese obi-style sash.

Sometime after 1862, Tissot began to shift focus from his early medievalist styles to instead match English tastes for narrative paintings of Victorian life and society. He quickly gained success among British audiences and was lauded for his photorealistic, narrative style of art that combined meticulous training with an impressionistic use of color and value. Tissot came to maintain a wide social sphere in light of his success and lifestyle, including Oscar Wilde, James Abbott Whistler, and Edgar Degas. Degas shared many of his cultural interests as Tissot's mentee, notably producing a portrait of Tissot in which he is sitting below a Japanese screen hanging on the wall.

Tissot led a tumultuous life outside of painting, fighting in the Franco-Prussian War as part of the improvised defence of Paris; First by joining two companies of the Garde Nationale and later as part of the radical Paris Commune, though he is believed to have only joined the latter to protect his own belongings rather than for shared ideology. Either because of the radical political associations of serving as a Communard or because of better opportunities, he left Paris for London in 1871. Seymour Haden helped him to learn etching techniques during this period.

Having already worked as a caricaturist for Thomas Gibson Bowles, the owner of the magazine Vanity Fair, as well as exhibited at the Royal Academy, Tissot arrived with established social and artistic connections in London. Tissot used the name Coïdé in the magazine from 1869 to 1873. Tissot's pre-war caricaturist work with Vanity Fair included contributions to Sovereigns, a series lampooning various heads of state such as Napoleon III of France, Alexander II of Russia, or Wilhelm I of Germany, depicting the latter two in particular as bloodthirsty conquerors.

=== Post-war career ===
Tissot would further explore political themes of turmoil in Europe during the onset and aftermath of the war: The 1870 painting La Partie Carrée evoked nostalgia for the period of the French Revolution while hinting at the hedonism of the contemporary French aristocracy in portraying a pair of young women picnicking with two men, one in revolutionary military garb, while the c. 1873 work Still on Top depicted the allegorical ascension of the Austrian Habsburg and North German war flags over other European flags, with title being thought to be a reference to the British ensign barely visible at the top of the canvas. Tissot produced The Ball on Shipboard in 1874 with a similar subject, depicting a diverse range of contemporary national flags sewn together in a large awning.

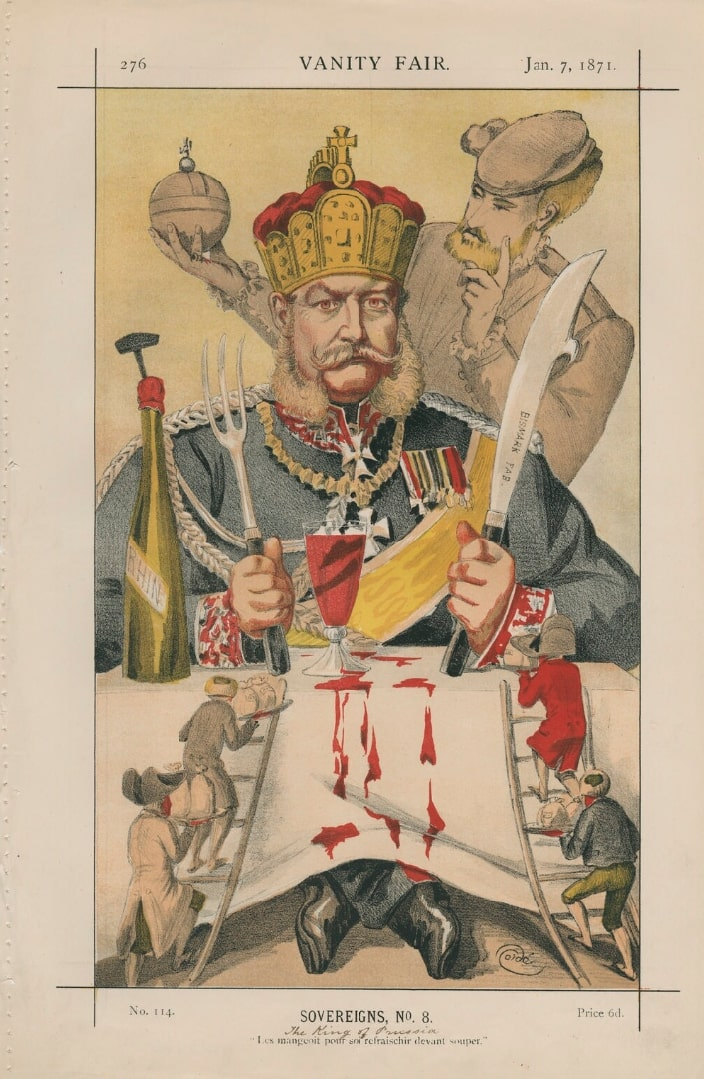
Sovereigns No. 8, Wilhelm I (Les mangeoit pour soi refraischir devant souper), 1871

Once established in London, Tissot quickly developed his reputation as a painter of elegantly dressed women shown in scenes of fashionable life. By 1872 Tissot had bought a house in St John's Wood, an area of London very popular with artists at the time. Writer and critic Edmond de Goncourt sarcastically described "a studio with a waiting room where, at all times, there is iced champagne at the disposal of visitors" by 1874. Tissot gained membership of The Arts Club in 1873, and his paintings appealed greatly to wealthy British industrialists throughout the second half of the 19th century. During 1872 he earned 94,515 francs, an income normally only enjoyed by the upper classes of British society.

Tissot is considered a core figure of Japonisme alongside contemporaries such as Alfred Stevens and Claude Monet, a widespread artistic movement formed in response to the sudden influx of Japanese art, textiles, and curiosities into the European market as a result of the forced opening of trade relations with Japan in 1853 and subsequent Meiji Restoration in 1868. Printed Japanese art emphasized clarity, spaciousness, and boldness appealing to the Ukiyo urban culture and Tissot came to regularly include popular Japanese artifacts and costumes in his pictures after being introduced to the subject by Whistler, additionally expressing stylistic influences in his use of composition and perspective.

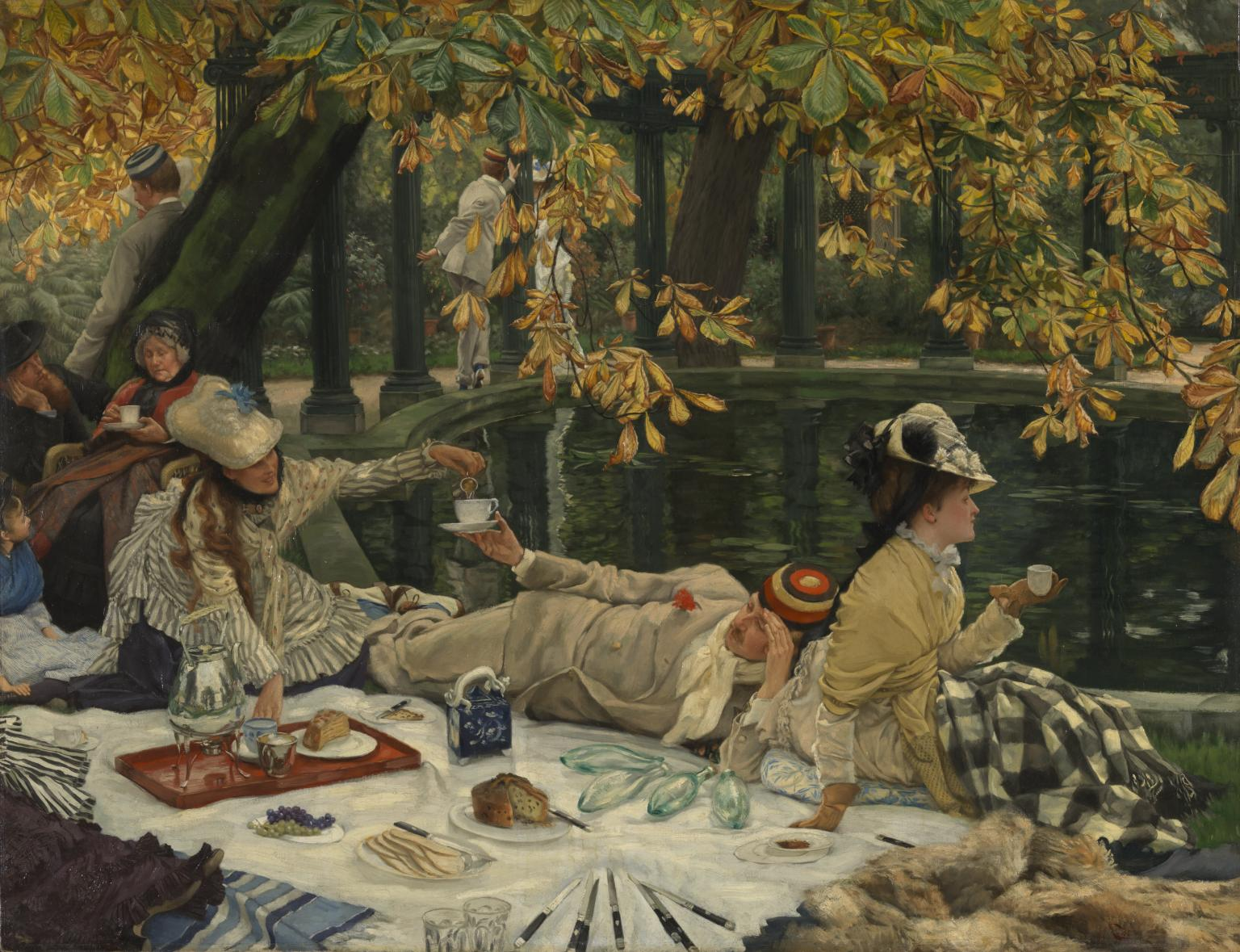
Holyday, 1876. Thought to originally have been part of a diptych depicting Tissot's garden in St. John's, alongside A Convalescent, c. 1876

In 1874, Degas asked him to join them in the first exhibition organized by the artists who became known as the Impressionists, a then-nascent artistic movement that would inspire much of Tissot's own style. Tissot ultimately refused but would remain a close acquaintance of the group. Berthe Morisot visited him in London in 1874, and he travelled to Venice with Édouard Manet at about the same time. He regularly saw Whistler, who influenced Tissot's Thames river scenes.

A strong recurring theme throughout Tissot's middle career was the exploration of social and sexual tension between men and women in the context of strictly gender-segregated Victorian society. Many of his depictions of contemporary life include hints or narratives of desire, vulgarity, and the complexity of sexual relationships, while his idiosyncratic focus on women's fashion and society made an idealized female beauty a widespread commonality of his portraiture. The Gallery of H.M.S. 'Calcutta' (Portsmouth) (1876) was particularly noted for its use of body language and subtext in depicting a scandalous moment of flirtation between a married officer and a young woman, with the perspective heavily accentuating the latter's figure and sexuality. The work received criticism as "hard, vulgar, and banal" upon release, and some scholars have even suggested Tissot's selection of the Calcutta for the painting's setting to be a deliberate play on the phrase "Quel cul tu as" ("What an arse you have" in French). Portsmouth Dockyard, an 1877 variation on a painting titled On The Thames (How Happy I Could Be with Either?), received similar accusations of immorality for its ambiguous depiction of what its predecessor's alternative title reveals to be a military man openly deciding between two potential suitresses.

=== Family life and bereavement ===
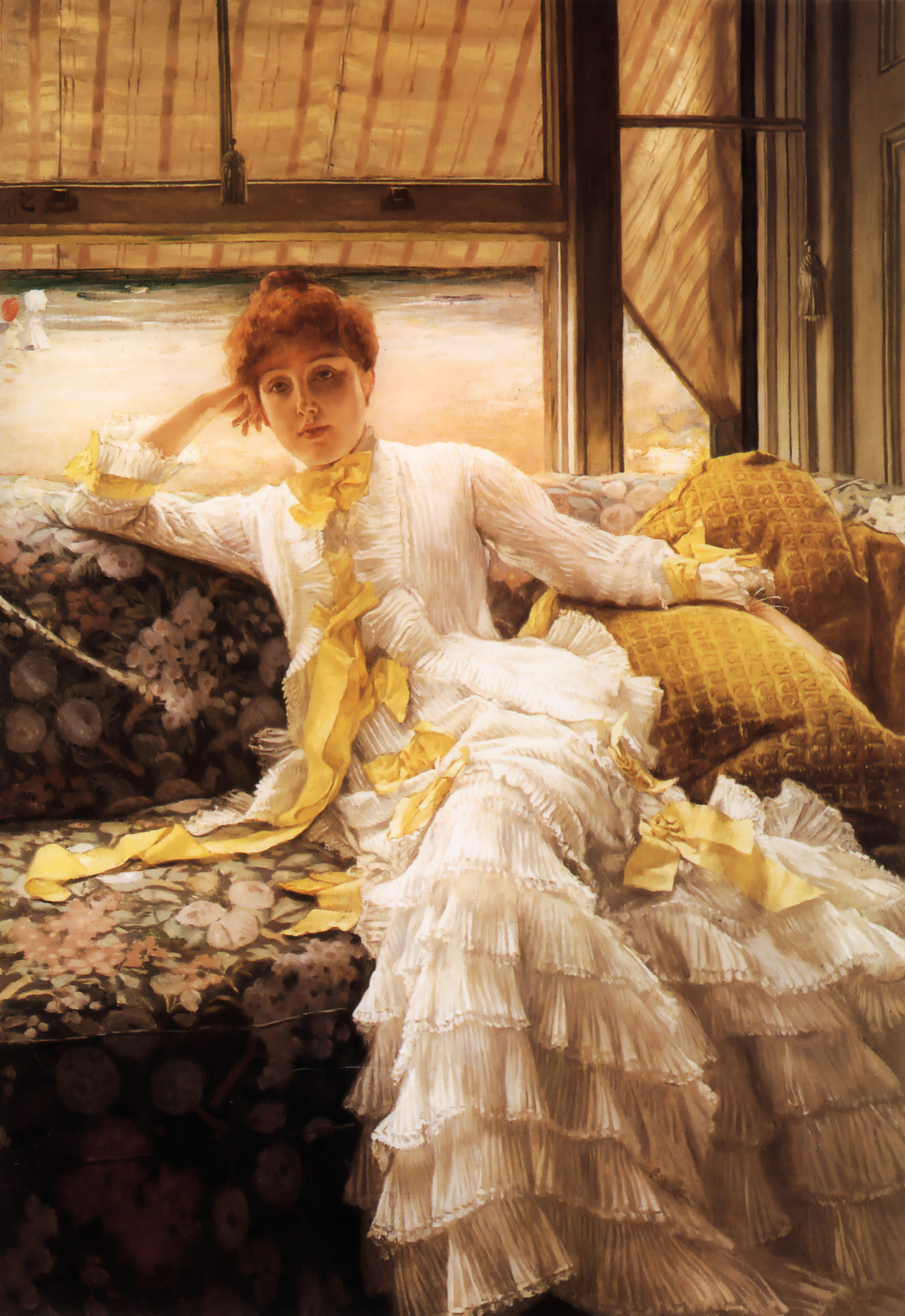
Seaside, 1878

In 1875 or 1876, Tissot met Kathleen Newton, an Irish divorcee who became the painter's companion and frequent sitter. She quickly began an intimate relationship with Tissot, moving in as a housemate in 1877. The couple's marital status was uncertain, as Tissot's Catholic faith did not recognize her divorce and meant they could not opt for annulment without delegitimizing her previous children; however, they chose to live openly as husband and wife and their servants addressed Newton as "Madame Tissot". Newton is said to have called Tissot "Jimmie", while his pet names for her included "Kitty", "Petite Femme", and "Mavourneen" (an Irish term after "Kathleen Mavourneen", a popular love song from the time). Newton gave birth to a son named Cecil George Newton in 1876, who is believed to be Tissot's, and the couple would frequently entertain her previous children at Tissot's property even while they continued to live with her relatives. Later, Tissot often referred to these years with Newton as the happiest of his life, a time when he was able to live out his dream of being a family man.

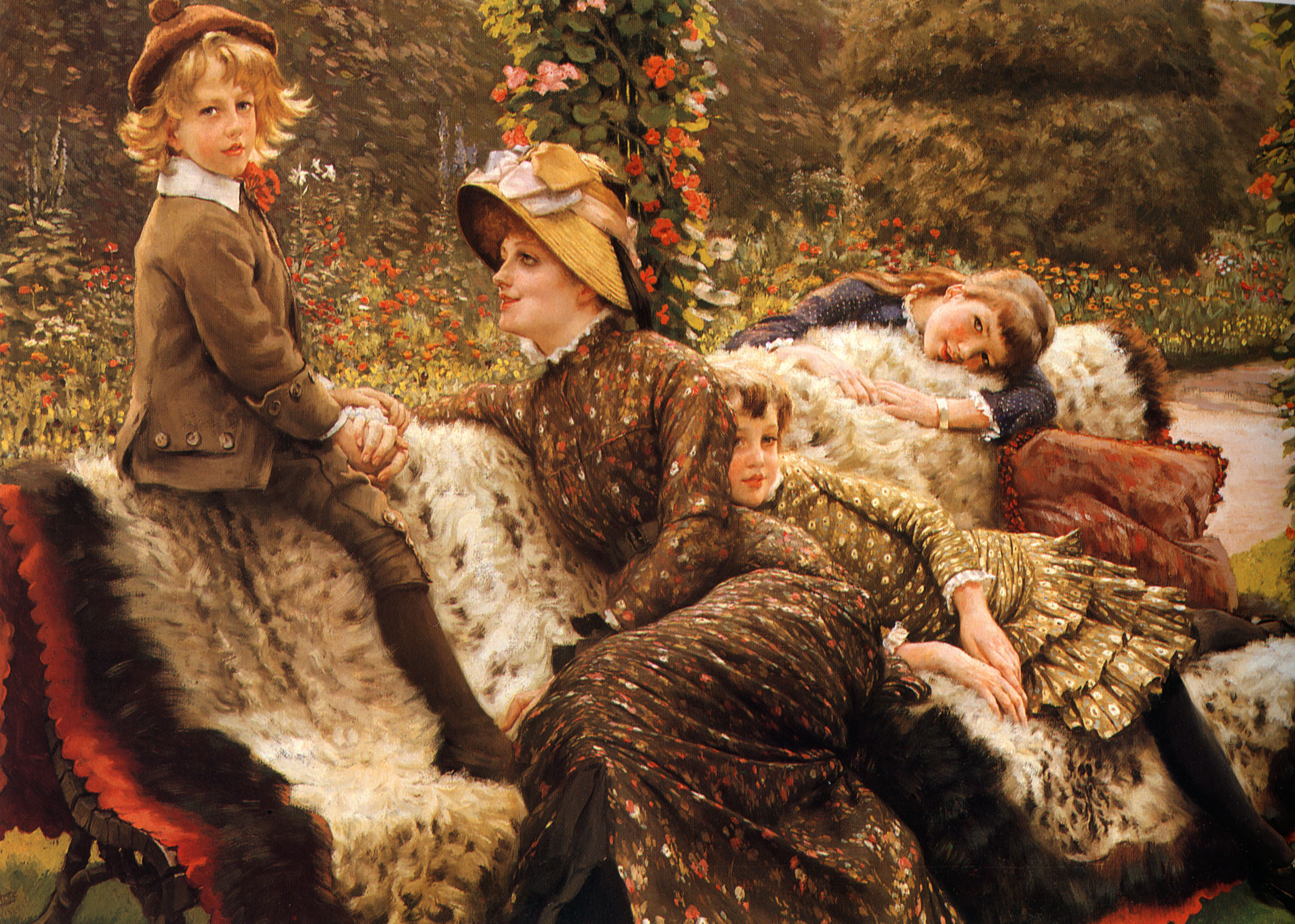
The Garden Bench, 1882

Newton's work as a sitter for Tissot encompassed dozens of paintings and studies, most notably including a well-known 1876 etching entitled Portrait of Mrs N., more commonly titled La Frileuse, which was later the basis for the 1877 painting Mavourneen, also known as A Portrait or as Winter. Tissot's paintings and prints of 1877–1881 included images of travel along the Thames or south coast and to Paris, but many focused on Newton relaxing and reading in the garden, or surrounded by visiting children. Around 1880–1881 she contracted tuberculosis and Tissot portrayed her sitting well-wrapped outdoors, as fresh air was thought to have a curing effect. Newton succumbed to her illness in Tissot's arms on 9 November 1882, "with the ardent faith of a neophyte and the silent resignation of a saint."

After Kathleen Newton's death, Tissot returned to Paris. The last major exhibition of this era in Tissot's life took place in 1885, with a 15-painting series titled Quinze Tableau sur la Femme à Paris (Fifteen Paintings on the Woman of Paris), displayed at the Galerie Sedelmeyer. Unlike the genre scenes of fashionable women he painted in London, these paintings sought to represent different archetypes of women across many different classes and occupations, shown in professional and social scenes. The Shop Girl in particular seemed to return to Tissot's exploration of sexuality and gender, with one writer identifying depictions of desire and baseness in the composition, while the series's wider inclusion of working class women outside of the household as subjects could have been seen as morally dubious at the time. La Femme à Paris also solidified the influence of Japanese prints in Tissot's work, as he used unexpected angles and framing from that tradition to create a monumental context in the size of the canvases.

La Femme à Paris

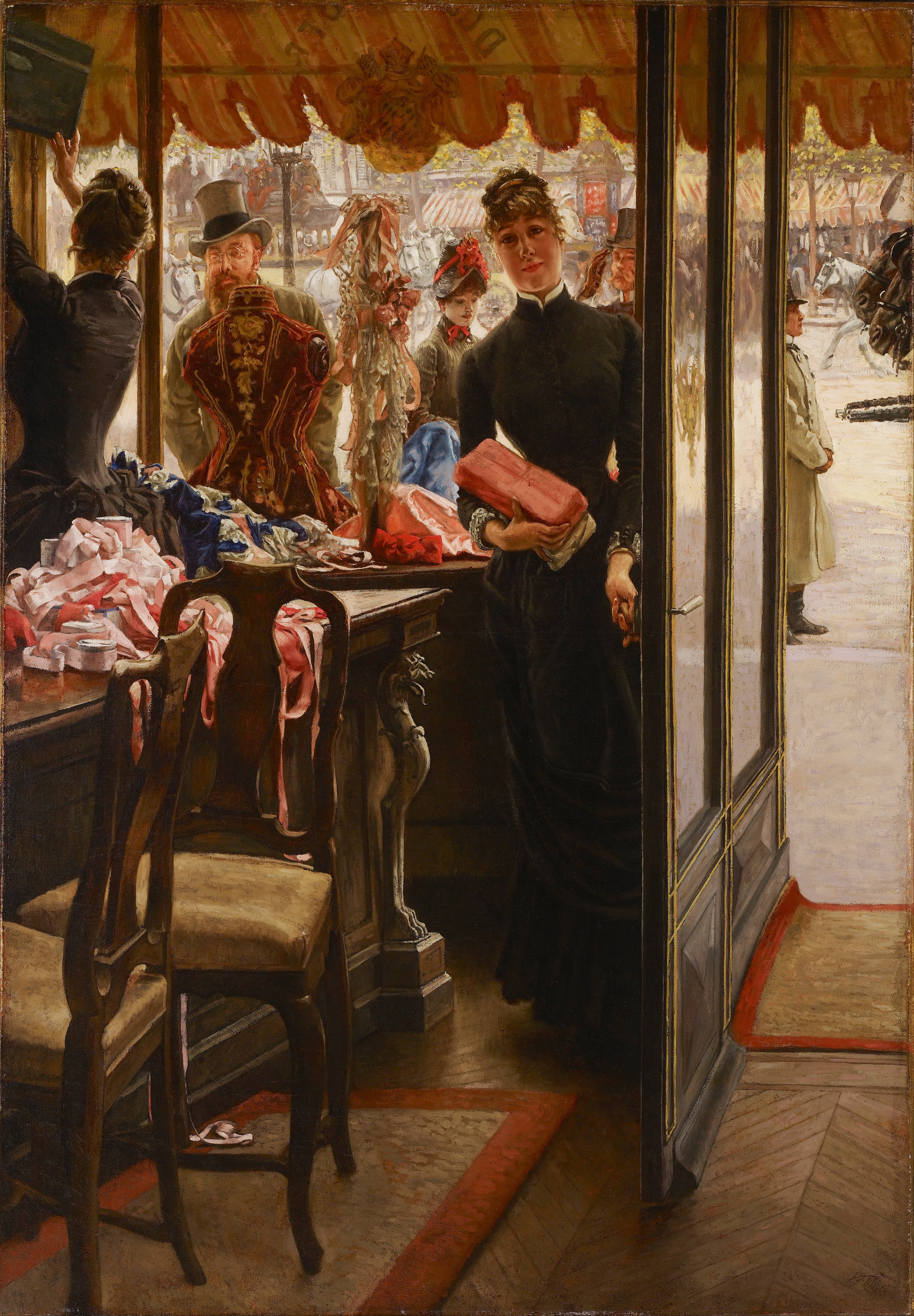
The Shop Girl, c. 1878–1885

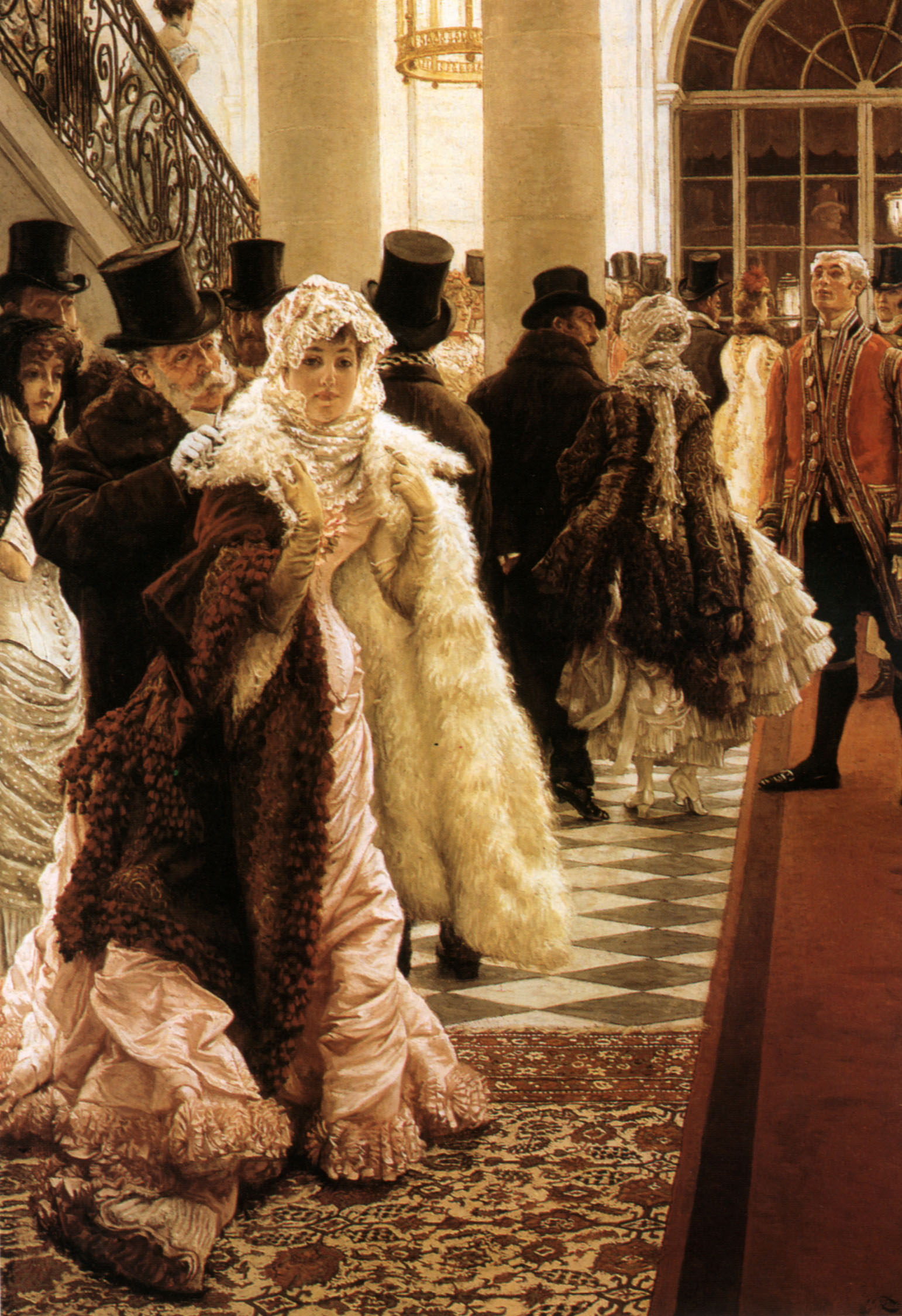
The Woman of Fashion, c. 1883–1885

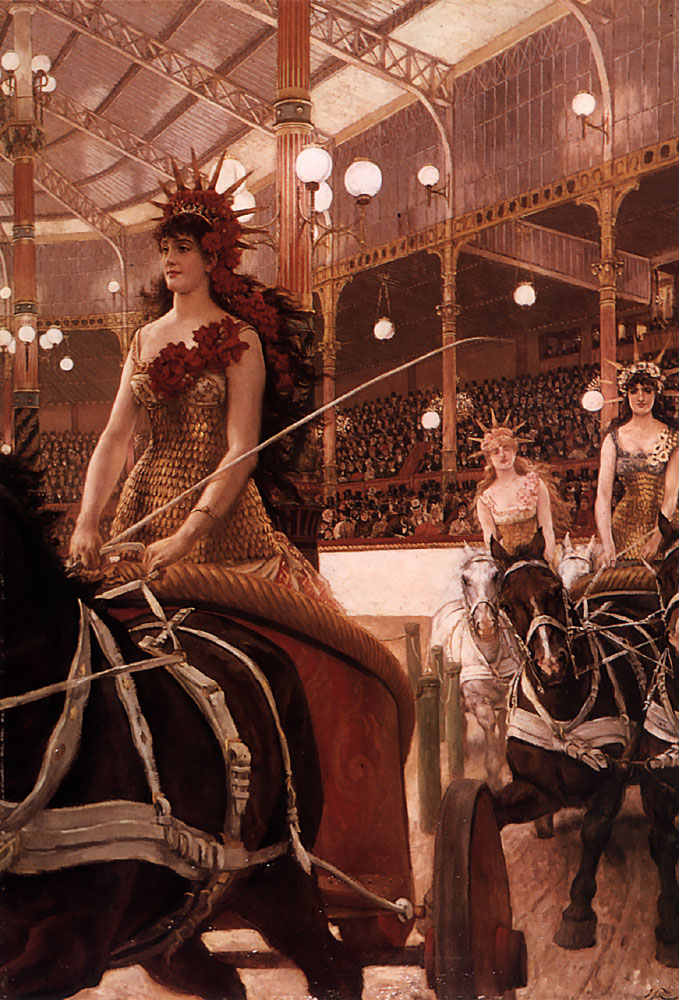
The Ladies of the Cars, c. 1883–1885

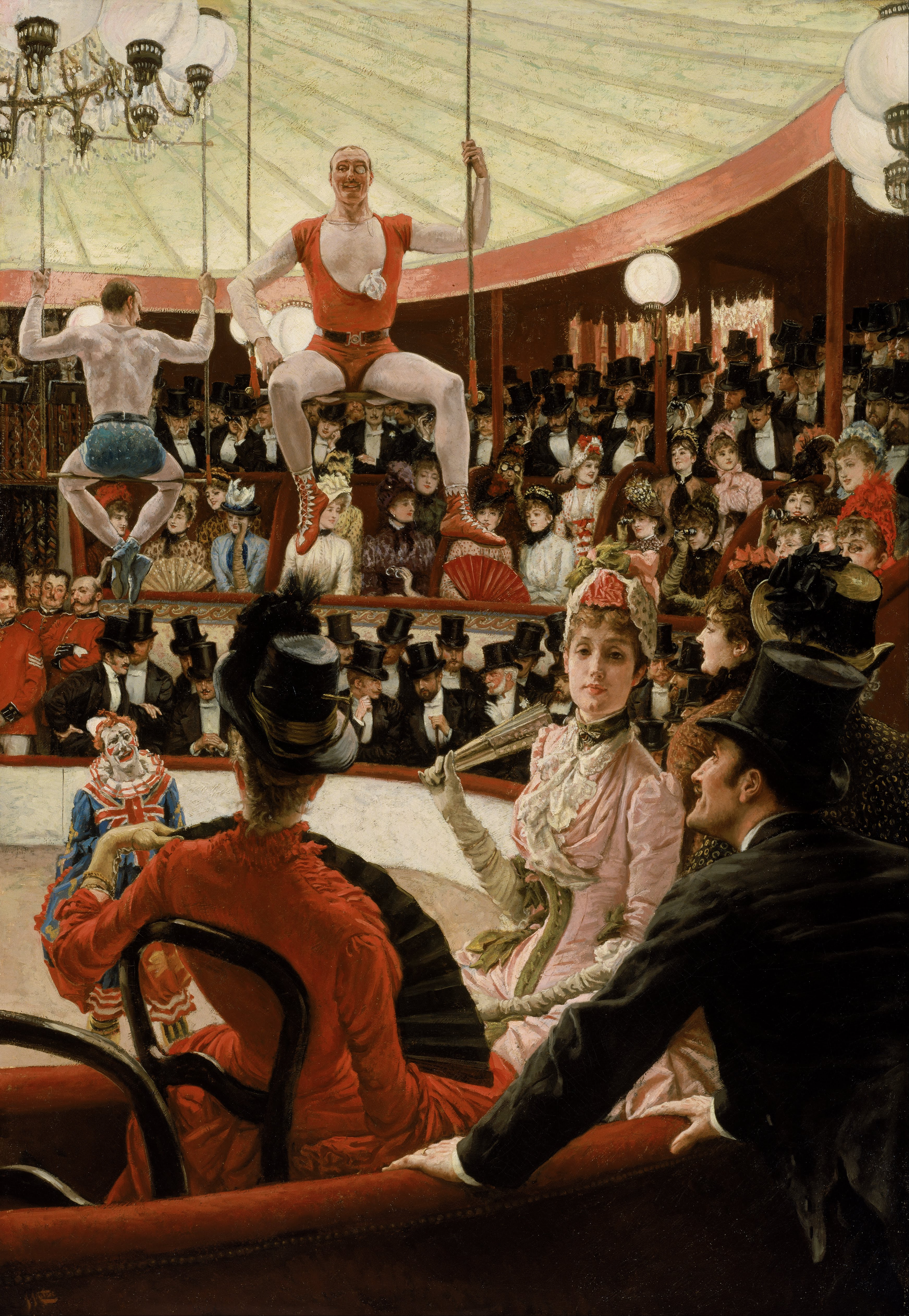
The Circus Lover, 1885

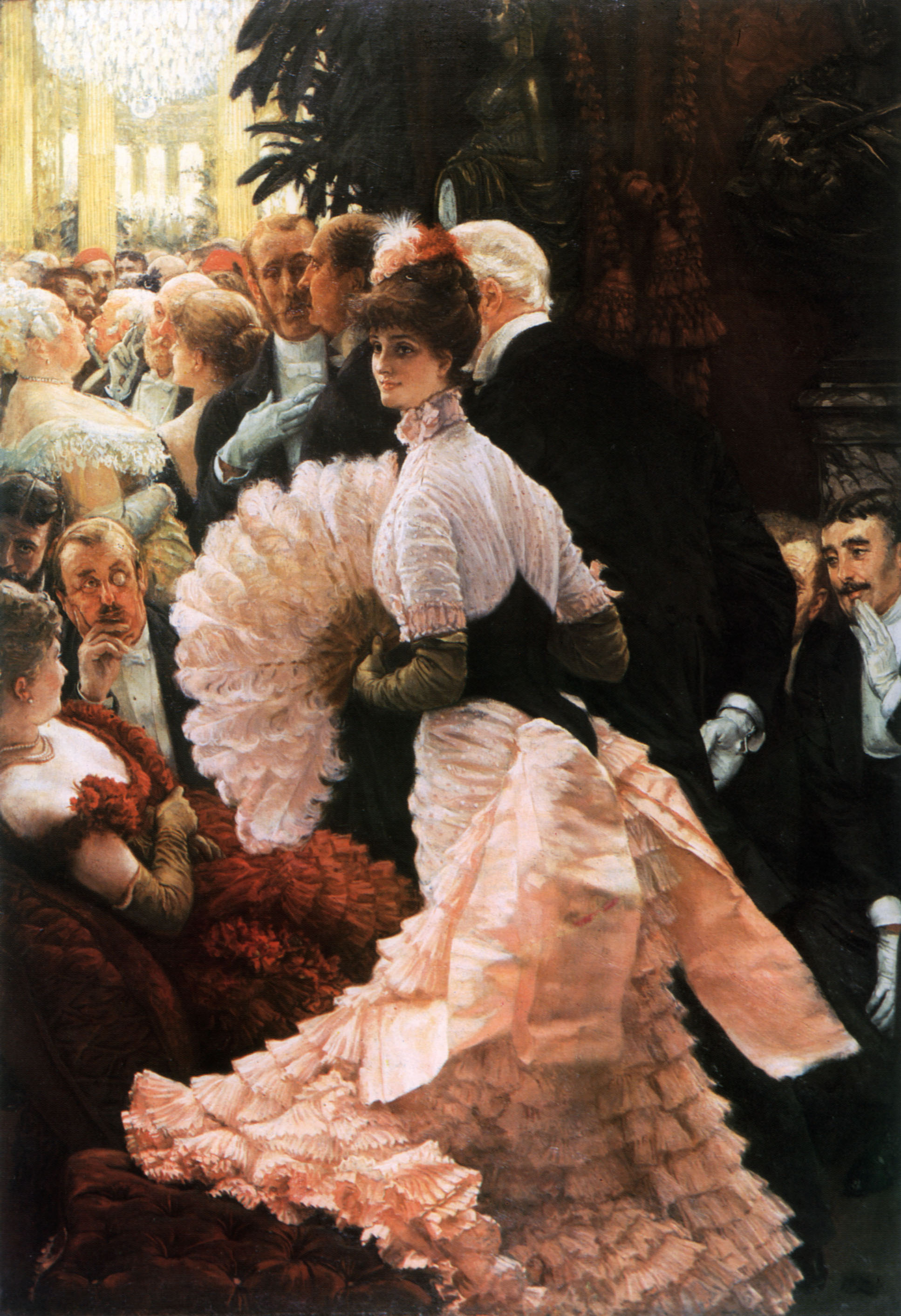
A Woman of Ambition, 1885

== Late career ==
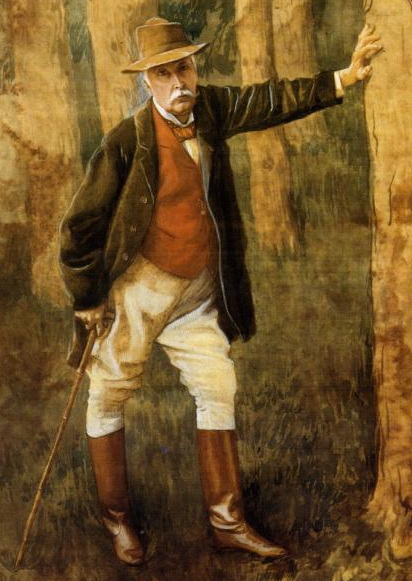
Detail, self-portrait on silk, 1898

After completing the Woman of Paris in 1885 Tissot experienced a religious vision at the Church of St. Sulpice, leading him to revive his Catholic faith and spend the remainder of his life making paintings about biblical events. Moving away from the Impressionists' and Post-Impressionists' intent to create art that reflected a changing, modern world, Tissot returned to traditional, representational styles and narratives in his watercolors. As part of this artistic effort Tissot traveled to the Middle East in 1886, 1889, and 1896 to make studies of its landscapes and cultures, which would come to distinguish his series from contemporary Biblical art through its "considerable archaeological exactitude" in striving for accuracy rather than religious emotion. His series of 365 gouache illustrations showing the life of Christ were shown to critical acclaim and enthusiastic audiences in Paris (1894–1895), London (1896) and New York (1898–1899), before being bought by the Brooklyn Museum in 1900. They were published in a French edition in 1896–1897 and in an English one in 1897–1898, bringing Tissot vast wealth and fame. During July 1894, Tissot was awarded the Legion of Honour, France's most prestigious medal.

Tissot spent the last years of his life working on paintings of subjects from the Old Testament. Although he never completed the series, he exhibited 80 of these paintings in Paris in 1901 and engravings after them were published in 1904.

The Life of Christ

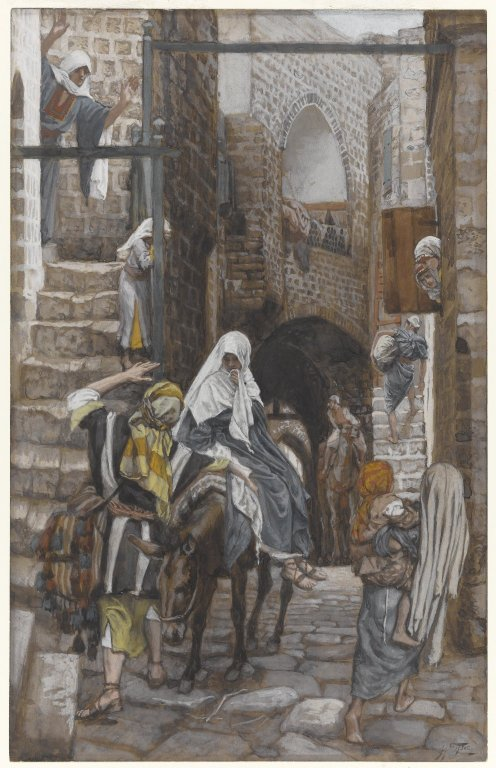
Saint Joseph Seeks a Lodging in Bethlehem

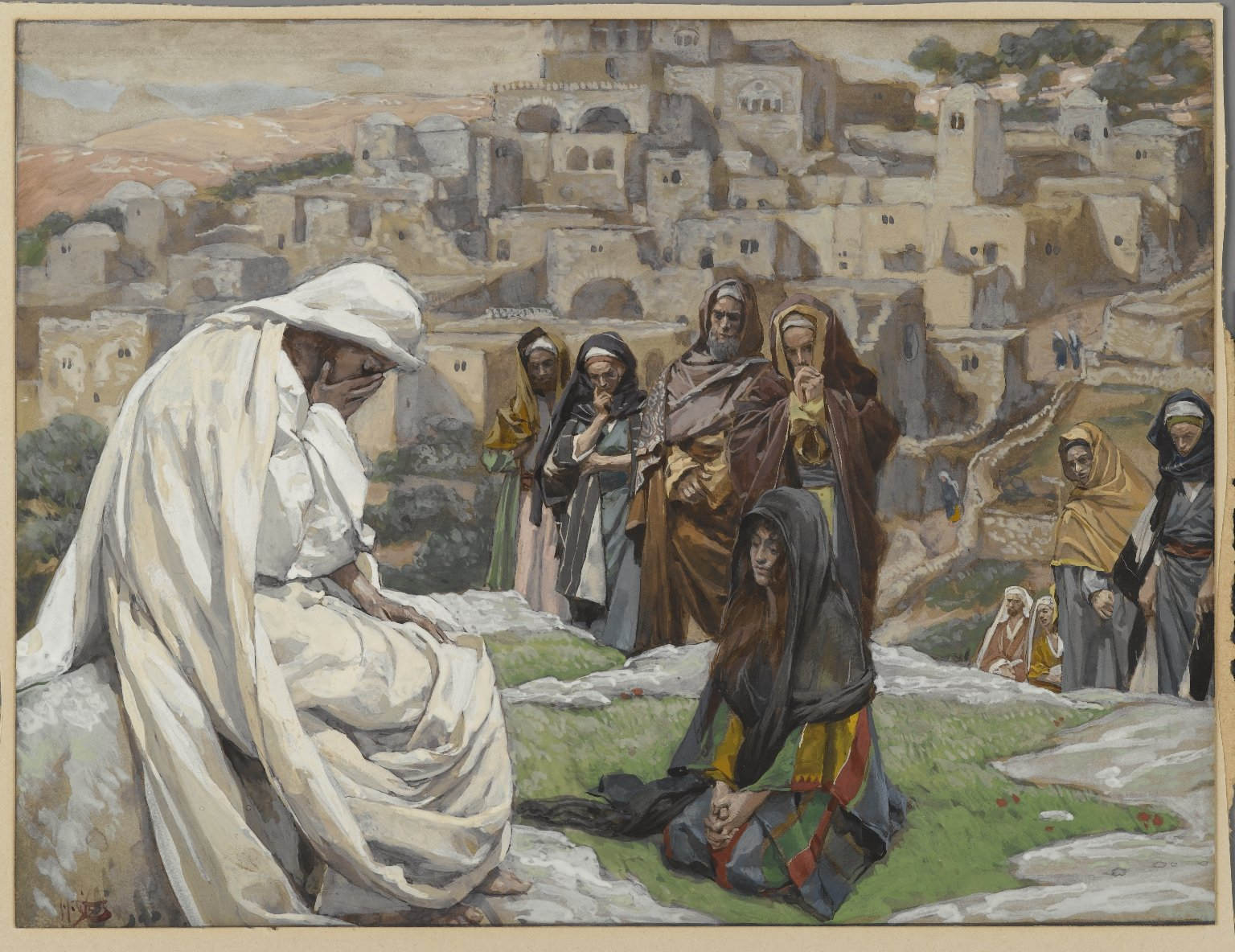
Jesus Wept

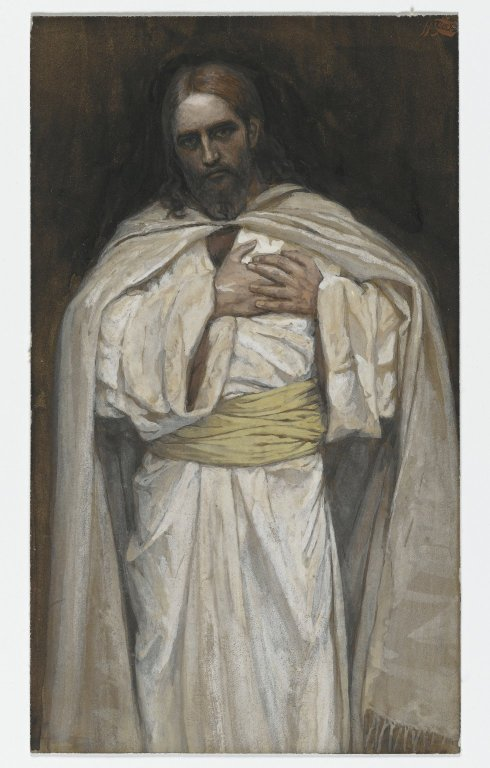
Our Lord Jesus Christ

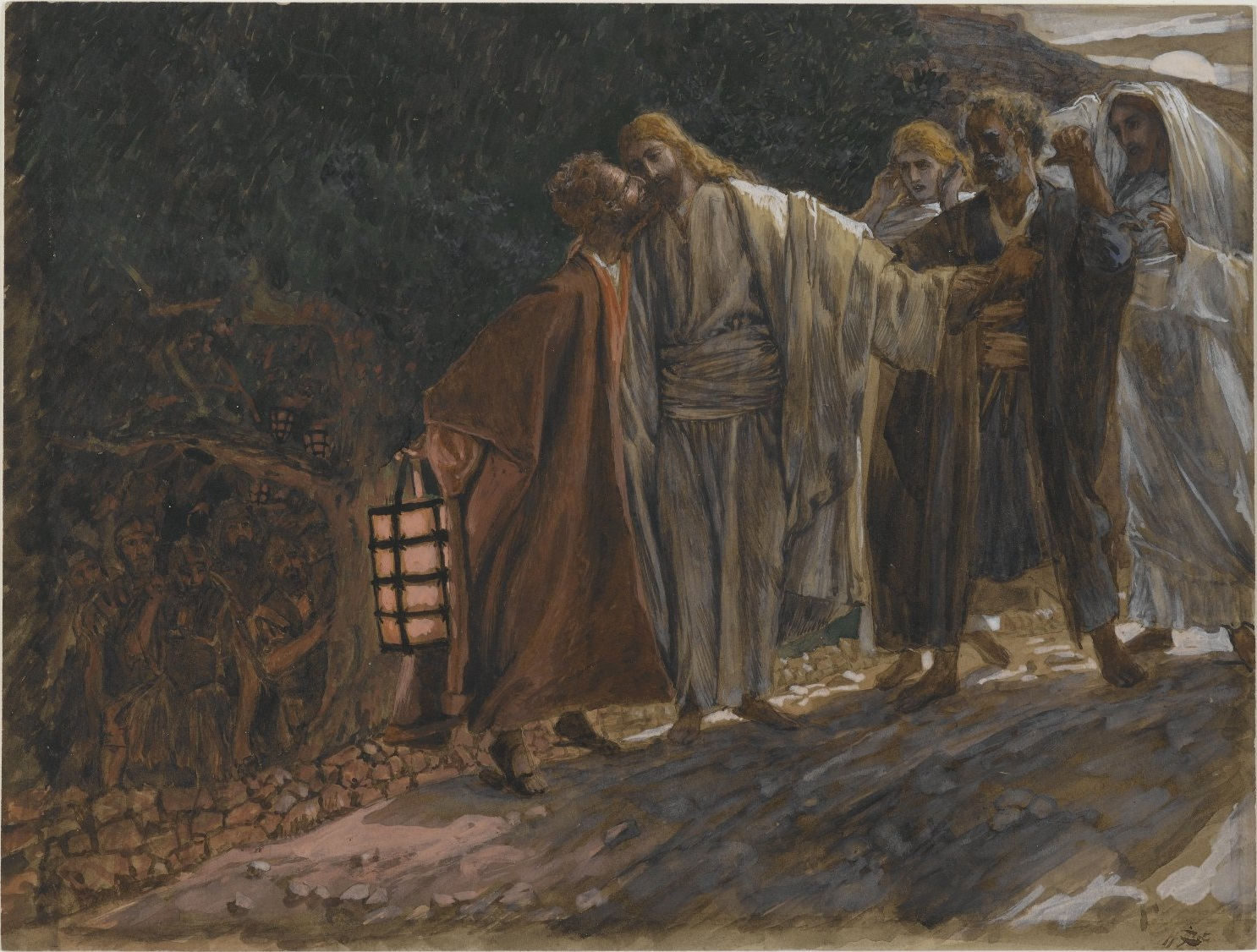
The Kiss of Judas

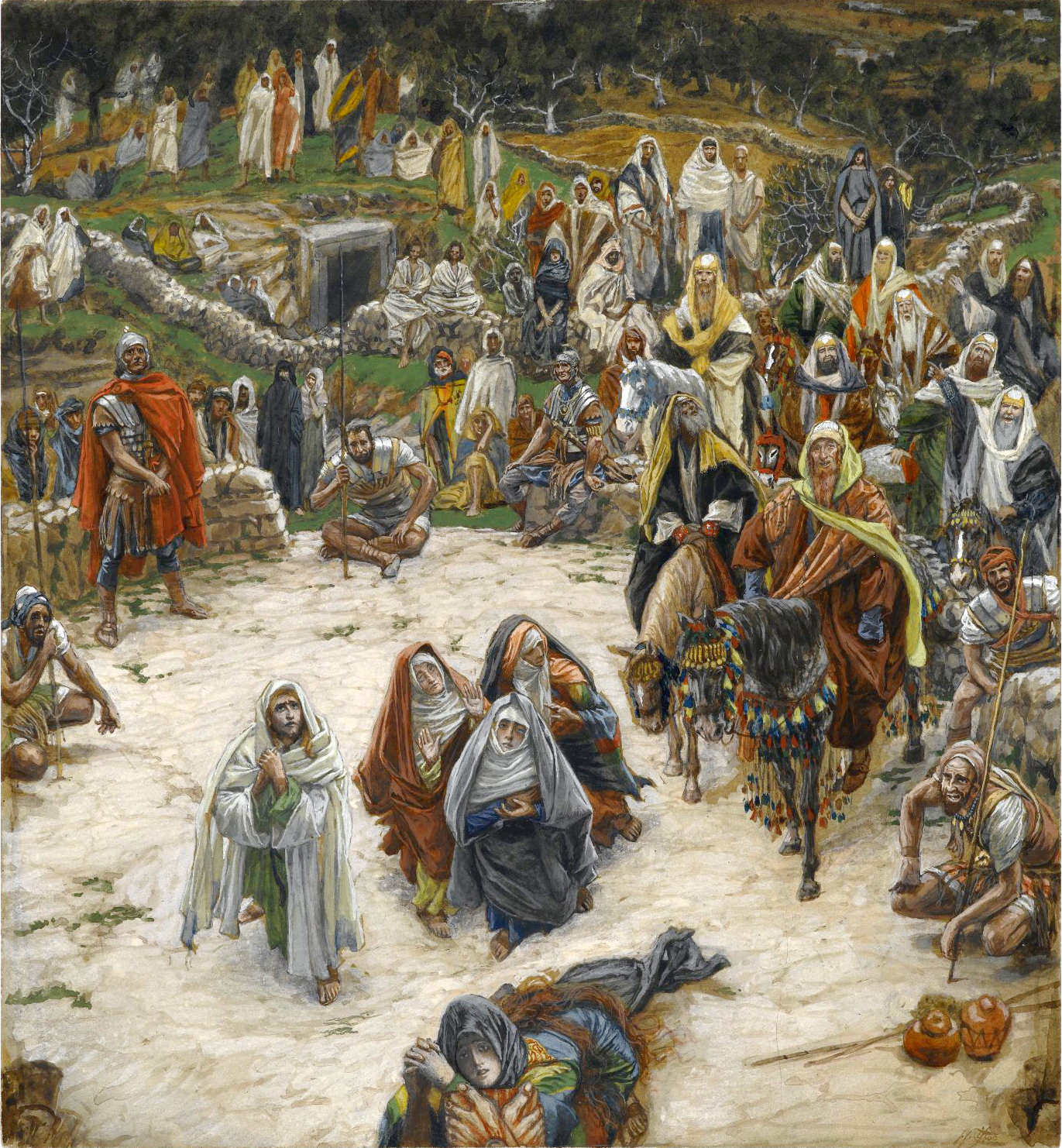
What Our Lord Saw from the Cross

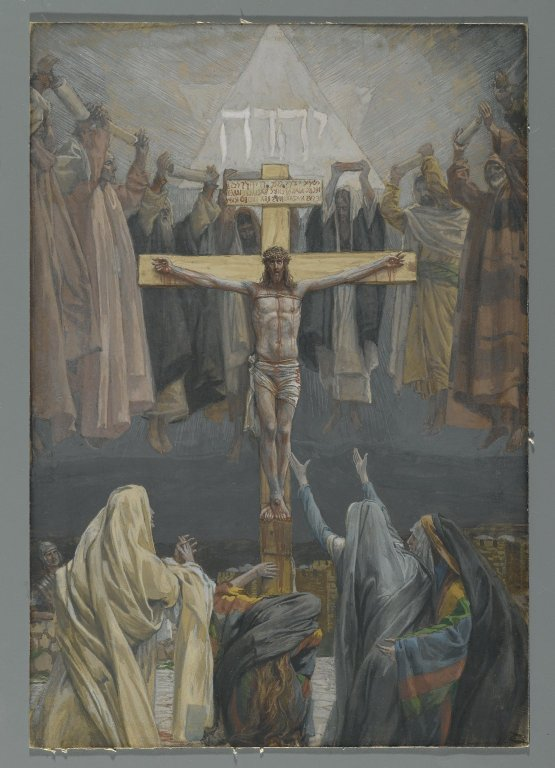
It Is Finished (Consummatum Est)

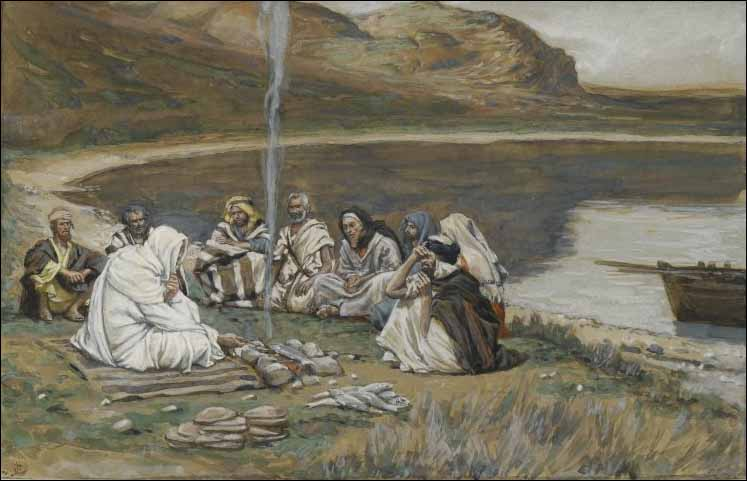
Meal of Our Lord and the Apostles
Subjects from the Old Testament

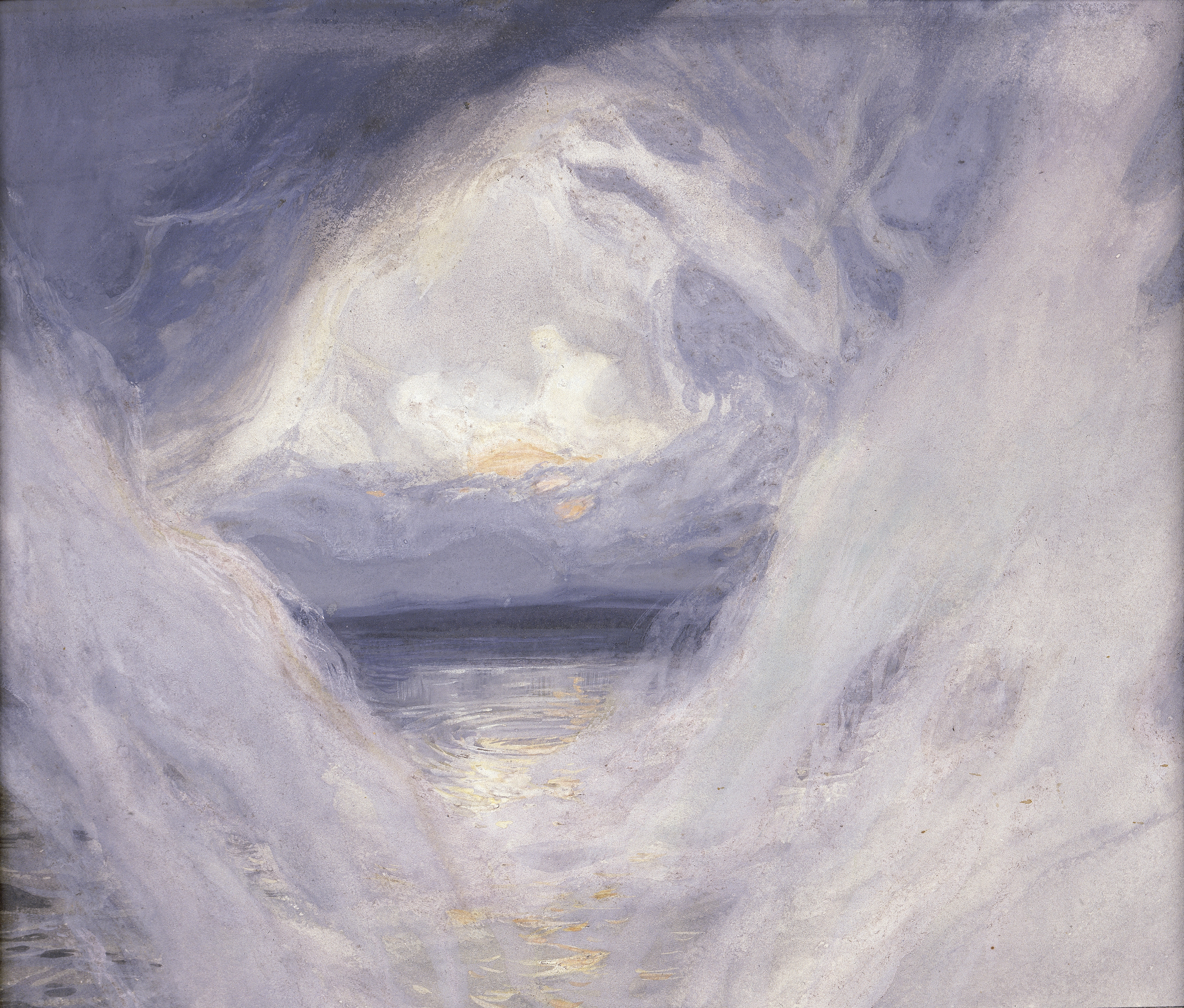
The Creation, Jewish Museum (New York), c. 1896–1902

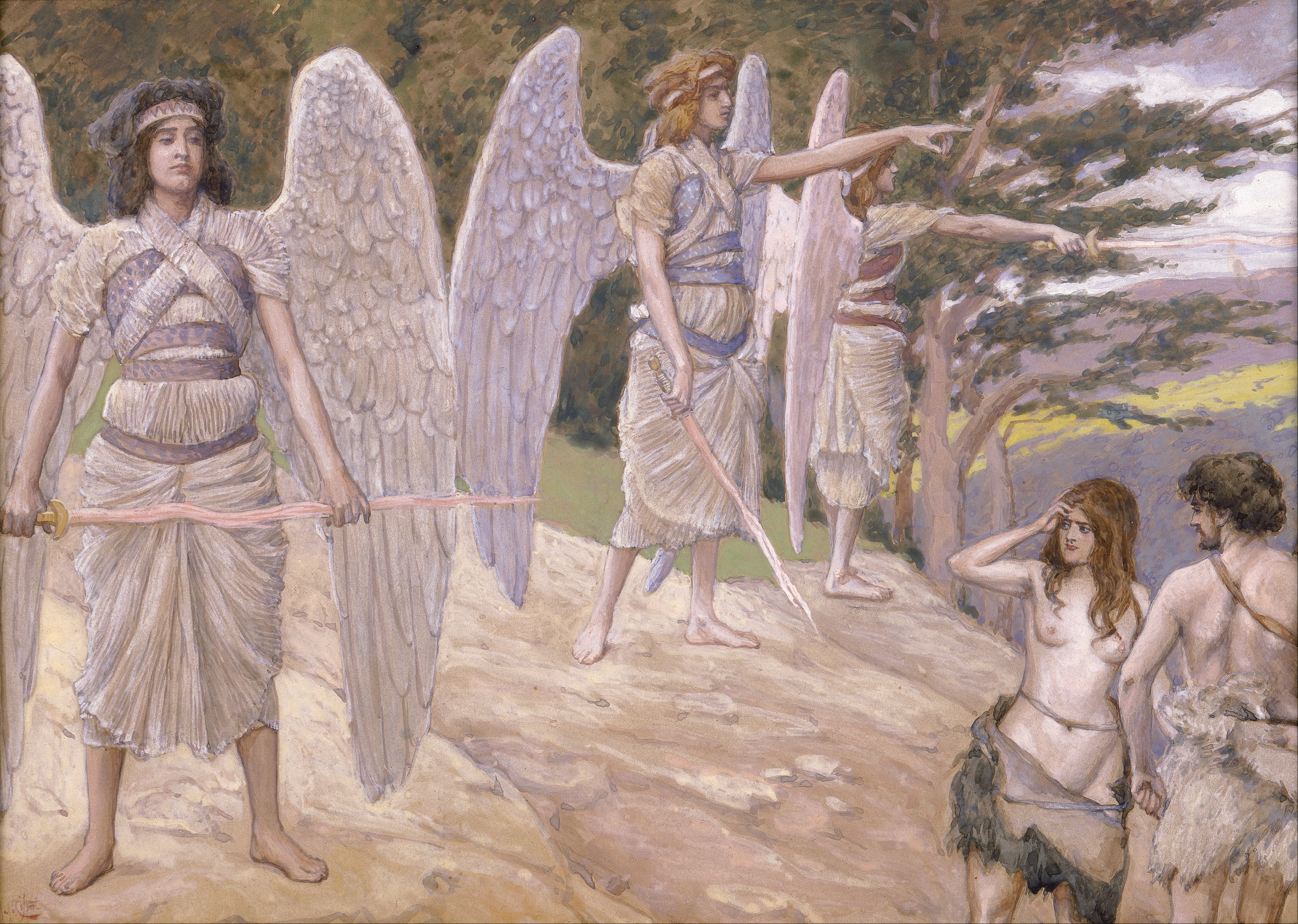
Adam and Eve Driven From Paradise, c. 1896–1902

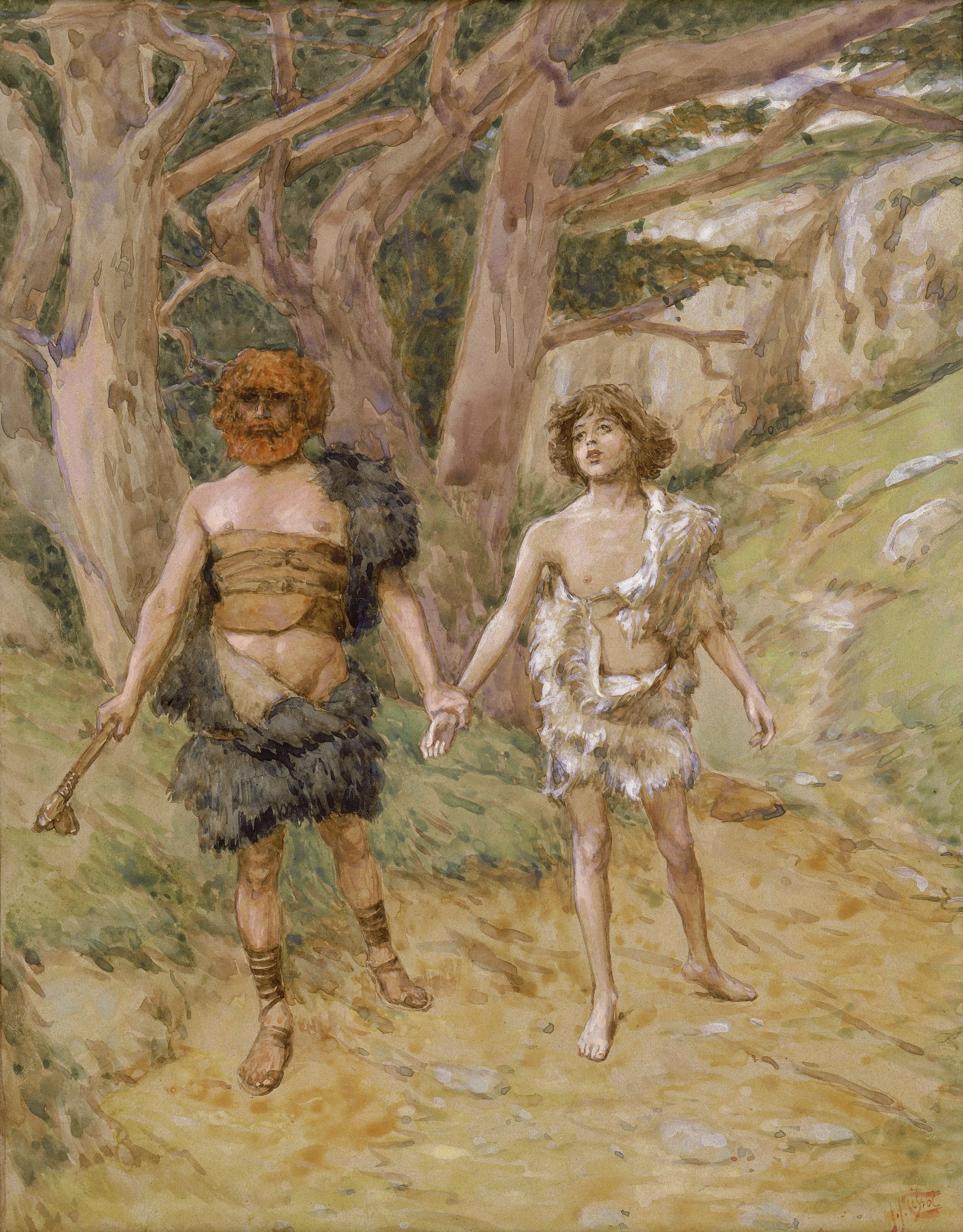
Cain leadeth Abel to death, c. 1900

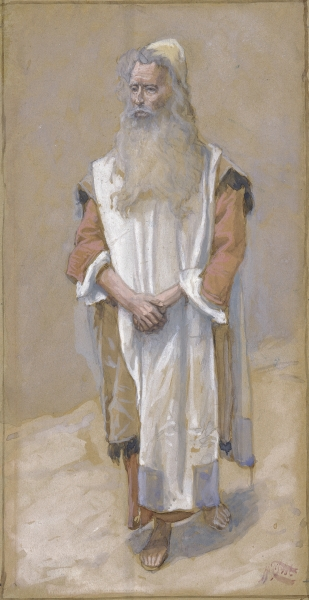
Moses, watercolor c. 1896–1902

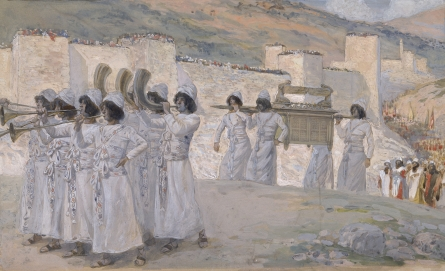
The Seven Trumpets of Jericho, c. 1896–1902

== Death and legacy ==
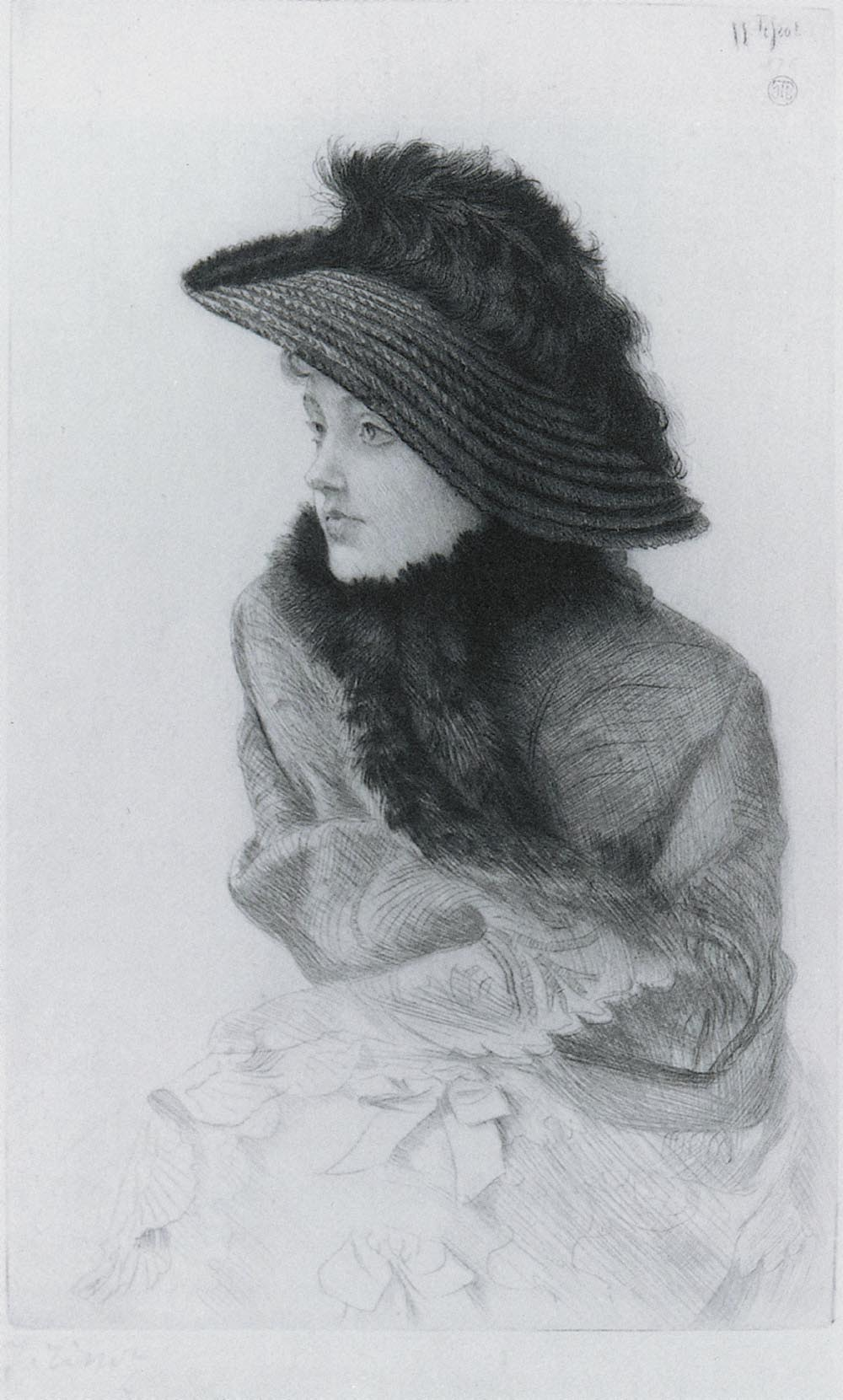
Portrait of Mrs N, also known as La Frileuse, 1876

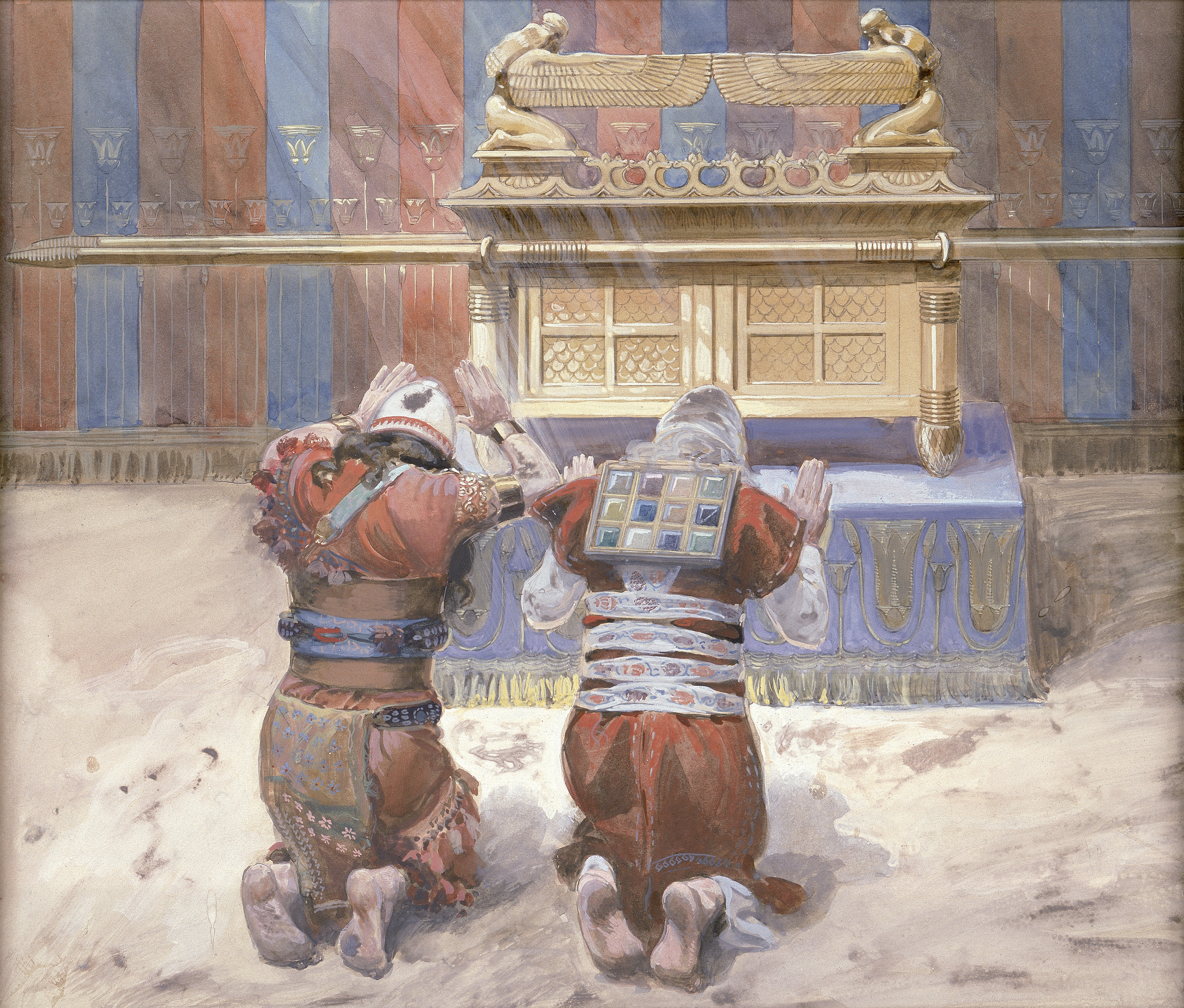
Moses and Joshua in the Tabernacle, c. 1896–1902

Tissot died suddenly in Doubs, France, on 8 August 1902, while living in the Château de Buillon, a former abbey which he had inherited from his father in 1888. His grave is in the chapel sited within the grounds of the chateau.

Widespread use of his illustrations in literature and slides continued after his death with The Life of Christ and The Old Testament becoming the "definitive Bible images" of Christian popular culture. In 1906, filmmaker Alice Guy-Blaché used the Tissot Bible as the basis for The Birth, the Life and the Death of Christ, her largest production at Gaumont to date featuring approximately three hundred extras over twenty-five total episodes. Though the financial success of his contemporary subjects originally did little to dissuade derision of his mundane, photorealistic style, with Oscar Wilde criticizing his "hard unscrupulousness in painting uninteresting objects in an uninteresting way", the first half of the 20th century saw a re-kindling of interest in his portraits of fashionable ladies and some fifty years later, these were achieving high prices. La Frileuse and his other etchings would also be brought back out of obscurity by reinvigorated critical interest from the 1920s onward. His images provided a foundation for contemporary films such as the twin-angel prop design for the Ark of the Covenant in Raiders of the Lost Ark (1981) and lifestyle themes in The Age of Innocence (1993). In 2000 English Victorian art writer Christopher Wood described Tissot as "the greatest painter of social life in Victorian times".

== See also ==
- List of Orientalist artists
- Orientalism
