= Holyday =

Holyday is often a surname. Notable people with the surname include:

- Barten Holyday (1593–1661), English clergyman, writer and poet
- Doug Holyday (born 1942), Canadian politician
- Stephen Holyday (born 1976), Canadian politician

== Paintings ==
- Holyday, by James Tissot

== See also ==
- Holiday (disambiguation)
