= Saint Joseph Seeks a Lodging at Bethlehem =

Painting by James Tissot

Saint Joseph Seeks a Lodging in Bethlehem
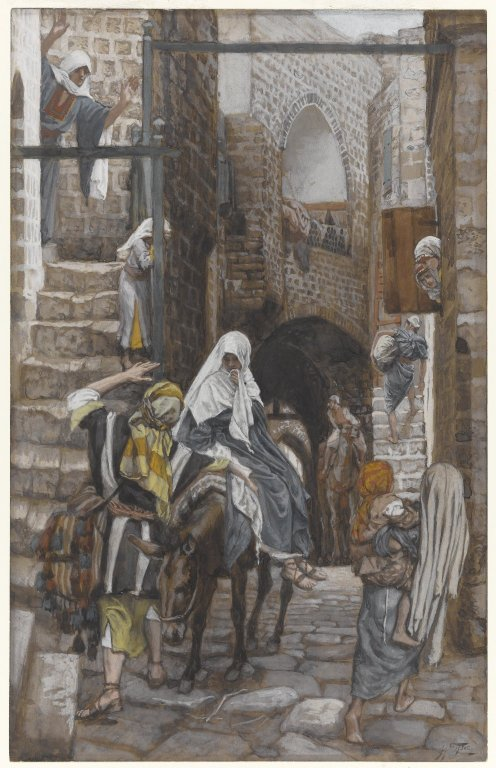
- Artist: James Tissot
- Year: 1886-1894
- Medium: Opaque watercolor over graphite on gray wove paper
- Dimensions: 26.5 cm × 16.8 cm (10.4 in × 6.6 in)
- Location: Brooklyn Museum, New York

Saint Joseph Seeks a Lodging at Bethlehem (French: (Saint Joseph cherche un gîte à Bethléem)) is an opaque watercolor painting over graphite by French artist James Tissot. The painting was created between 1886–1894, near the end of his career. It is held at the Brooklyn Museum, in New York. This style of painting is also known as Gouache.

== History and description ==
The painting depicts Mary and her husband, Joseph, looking for a room for the night. Because of the Census of Caesar Augustus (also known as the Census of Quirinius), the town is overcrowded and there is no room to be had. So they are being turned away at every door. In the picture itself, Joseph pleads with an inn keeper to give them a place to rest, while the weary Mary waits on the donkey with quiet resignation. The painting "strikes a realistic note" depicting Mary as a veiled woman in a narrow alley of an Eastern town.

== See also ==
- James Tissot's later career
- Gouache style of painting
