= Kathleen Newton =

Irish-British art model

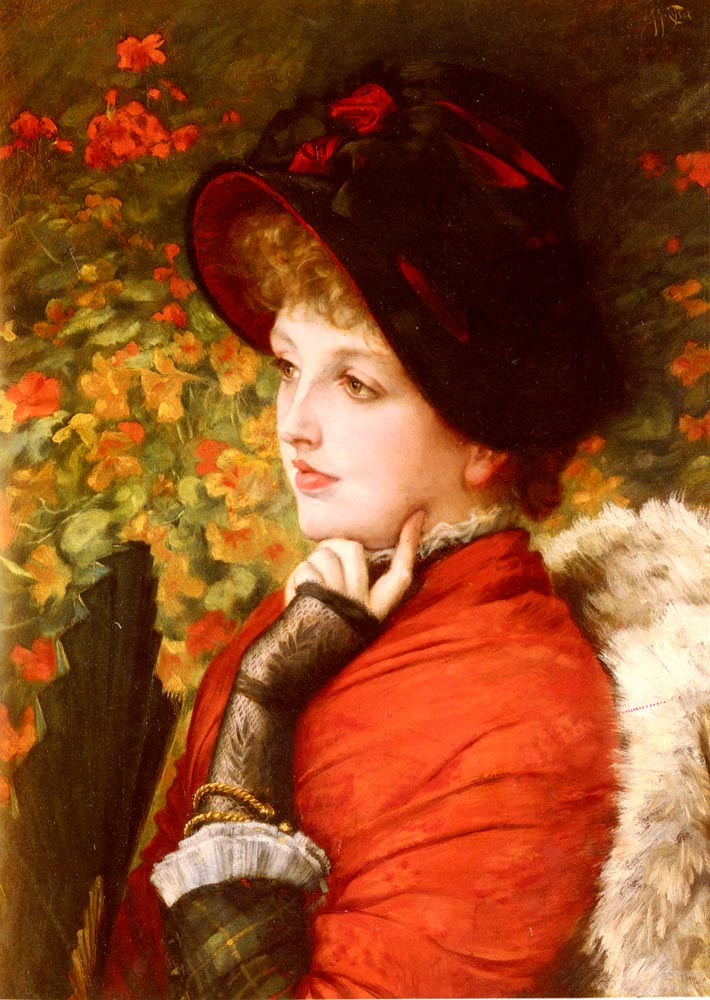
Painting by James Tissot, A Type of Beauty, 1880.

Kathleen Irene Ashburnham Newton (née Kelly; 1854–1882) was an Irish-British model, best known for her many sittings with the French artist James Tissot. Her artistic relationship with Tissot quickly turned into a romantic one, and the two lived together, representing themselves as a married couple, for the rest of her life, which was cut short by tuberculosis. She modeled for Tissot constantly throughout their time together, and Tissot's biographers remembered her as his muse.

Although Tissot's contemporary audience understood his relationship with Newton, biography published during his lifetime did not mention her, and magazine coverage of his work only discussed her obliquely. Tissot referred to her by pseudonyms like la mystérieuse (the mysterious) and la belle irlandaise (the Irish beauty) in the titles of his paintings. His biographers started including her in his story soon after he died in 1902, referring to her by a nickname, Kitty, that he had used. Her full identity entered the historical record in 1954, when her niece Lilian Hervey answered a journalist's plea for information about her.

== Early life ==
Kathleen Irene Ashburnham Kelly was born on 9 May 1854 in Agra, India. Her father, Charles Frederick Ashburnham Kelly, was employed in the Honourable East India Company's Civil Service and at his marriage in 1838 was a Clerk in the Collector's Office, Agra. By the time of his retirement in 1866 he was Chief Assistant in the Office of the Deputy Auditor and Accountant General of the Punjab in Lahore. The Kelly family had Irish heritage, and Irish cultural identity was rooted firmly in Kathleen, who would be described by James Tissot's 1906 biographer as "a ravishing Irishwoman".

She was the youngest child of Charles and his wife Flora Waterloo Kelly, née Boyd. After the Indian Rebellion of 1857-1858, Kathleen and her older sister Mary Pauline were among the many British women and children sent to England for safety. Charles Kelly entrusted them to his younger brother, Frederick Kelly, MRCSI, a General Practitioner in St Bride's, London, living at 60 Fetter Lane. The girls were baptised at the local Anglican church, Holy Trinity, on 29 August 1860. During the 1860s both were pupils at Gumley House convent school in Isleworth, Middlesex.

== Marriage, divorce and children ==
At the age of sixteen, Kathleen left school for an arranged marriage in India. Her eldest brother, George Lloyd Ashburnham Kelly, District Superintendent of Police in the Punjab, had brokered her marriage to an acquaintance, Dr Isaac Newton, a distinguished army surgeon, who had been appointed Superintendent of Vaccination for the Punjab in 1868. On the voyage to India, Kathleen met and fell in love with "Captain Palliser, an officer in the [Royal] Navy". This was Commander Henry St Leger Bury Palliser, on his way to join HMS Forte in Bombay harbour. After their arrival in Bombay on 2 September 1870, Palliser joined his ship while Kathleen travelled north with George and his new wife Kate to their home in Ludhiana, Punjab. There she was introduced to Newton, a widower twice her age and with a young son. George died suddenly on 4 December 1870, the cause certified as Delirium Tremens ("DTs"). He left no will and a penniless wife, Kate, who was seven months pregnant.

On 3 January 1871, Kathleen and Newton were married in Hoshiarpur, Punjab, home at that time to another of Kathleen's police-superintendent brothers, Frederick, who signed the marriage register as witness. Almost immediately she had regrets and the marriage was never consummated: Kathleen told Newton "she could never be his wife as she had already committed adultery". She ran away to her sister-in-law Kate, who sent her back to Newton. But Kathleen left Newton for good on 12 January, writing to him subsequently: "God knows I love that one too dearly to sin with any other. In what I have done I am not so much to blame as others, for our marriage was never consummated. I hope you will marry again, and I ask for your forgiveness." She also told Newton that she was pregnant with Captain Palliser's child and asked Newton to pay for her journey home. In May 1871 Newton began divorce proceedings, citing Palliser as co-respondent and Kathleen's letters to Newton as evidence of her infidelity. The decree nisi was granted on 30 December, the day Kathleen gave birth to a daughter, Muriel Violet Mary Newton, at Charles Kelly's house in Conisbrough, near Doncaster, Yorkshire, where he was living with Kathleen's unmarried sister Mary Pauline. Decree absolute was granted on 10 July 1872.

Little is recorded about Kathleen until 21 March 1876, when she gave birth in London to a son, Cecil George Newton, at 6 (now 12) Hill Road, St John's Wood. This was the home of Mary Pauline, who in 1874 had married Hervey Augustus Frederick Hervey and had two daughters, Isabelle Mary ("Belle", 1873-1929) and Lilian Ethel ("Lily", 1875-1952), born in Sidmouth, Devon, and nearby Newton Road respectively; a son, Arthur Reginald ("Bob", 1878-1961) would follow. Cecil's father was registered as Isaac Newton, though Kathleen had last seen him in January 1871 and they had been divorced almost four years. Some writers have speculated that Cecil was fathered by the anglophile French artist James Tissot, who was living within a short distance at 17 (now 44) Grove End Road, but this is unlikely. His first certain portrayal of Kathleen Newton is the etched Portrait of Mrs N., also known as La Frileuse, completed in late December 1876 after publication of Tissot's Ten Etchings portfolio. Ten Etchings was designed by Tissot to showcase the best of his recent work and would surely have included a portrait of Kathleen if they had become intimate in 1875. Most probably Palliser was Cecil's father, as he could have continued seeing Kathleen after returning to England.

== Life with Tissot ==
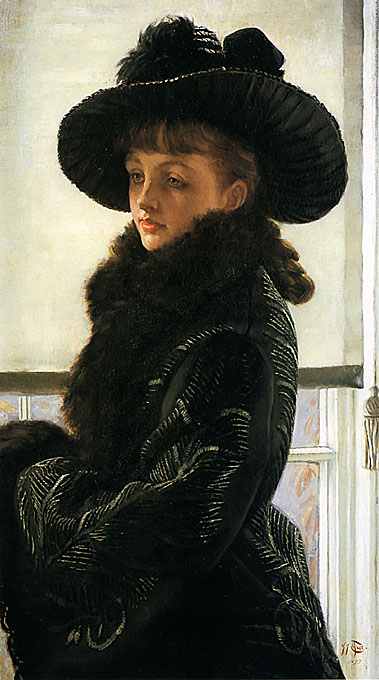
James Tissot, Mavourneen, 1877.

James Tissot had enjoyed a decade of artistic success in Paris, specialising in modern life and historical-dress pictures, before the Franco-Prussian War and siege of Paris in 1870-1871. After his involvement in the events of the 1871 Paris Commune, he was offered work in London, where he found eager buyers for his pictures and was able, by late 1872, to buy a house in Grove End Road. He relied on a range of sitters, but from 1877–1882 his most frequent, and often only, model was Kathleen Newton. According to Kathleen's niece Lilian Hervey, Tissot "could scarcely help noticing the pretty Mrs Newton" going past his house and "called to ask if he might paint her portrait. Over the sittings [presumably for the etched Portrait of Mrs N.] they fell deeply in love, and soon [in 1877] Mrs Newton went to live with Tissot." Her children remained at Hill Road with their aunt, cousins, and shared nanny, but visited Tissot's house for picnics and entertainment.

Newton and Tissot lived together openly as a married couple. They were unable to marry officially, as Tissot was a Roman Catholic, and divorce is not recognised by the Catholic Church. Annulment may have been possible, but would have made Newton's children illegitimate, a situation she had sought to avoid by registering their father as Dr Newton. Cohabitation was not uncommon at this time, especially among artists, but was disapproved of by many people. The couple's social sphere became limited to those who did not disapprove. "They had their own little literary and artistic circles," said Lilian Hervey, "in which the absence of a conventional wedding ring made no difference," including James McNeill Whistler, "Oscar Wilde with his brother Willie, Sir Charles Wyndham, Sir Henry Irving and Miss Mary Moore." Thomas Gibson Bowles, founder of the satirical weekly Vanity Fair and a longstanding friend of Tissot, was also a frequent visitor, and introduced others such as William Stone, "The Squire of Piccadilly", who recalled being "a good deal up at 17 Grove End Road and often had tea in the garden with Tissot and the lady." According to Stone, "Tissot was quite a boulevardier and could not grasp our somewhat puritanical outlook [on cohabitation]". Lilian said that "to the servants, Mrs Newton was always 'Madame Tissot'. She called her lover 'Jimmie', and he addressed her invariably as 'petite femme'."

An old French friend of Tissot remembered the artist calling his muse "Kitty". He described her, in his 1906 Tissot biography, as "a ravishing Irishwoman," "delightful," "educated and distinguished, tall and slim, with superb blue eyes and long golden hair." Tissot titled one of his etched portraits Mavourneen, a term of endearment derived from the Irish "mo mhuirnín" ("my dear one"), which featured in a popular Victorian sentimental song, Kathleen Mavourneen, as well as a play of the same title by William Travers revived in July 1876 at London's Globe Theatre, in which "Kathleen O'Connor, an Irish farm girl who dreams of becoming mistress of the local squire's great house, is offered a beautiful coat by the squire's sister." The etching has long been considered Tissot's masterpiece. His painted version, now known as Mavourneen, was exhibited at the Grosvenor Gallery in 1877 as A Portrait or Winter.

Tissot's paintings and prints of 1877 through 1881 include images of travel along the Thames or south coast and to Paris, but many focus on Kathleen relaxing and reading in the garden, or surrounded by visiting children.

== Illness and death ==
Around 1880-1881, Newton contracted tuberculosis. Tissot made her illness apparent in several paintings from 1881–1882, and he based an 1882 etching on a photo of her sitting well-wrapped next to him outdoors, in line with the tuberculosis management practices of the time.

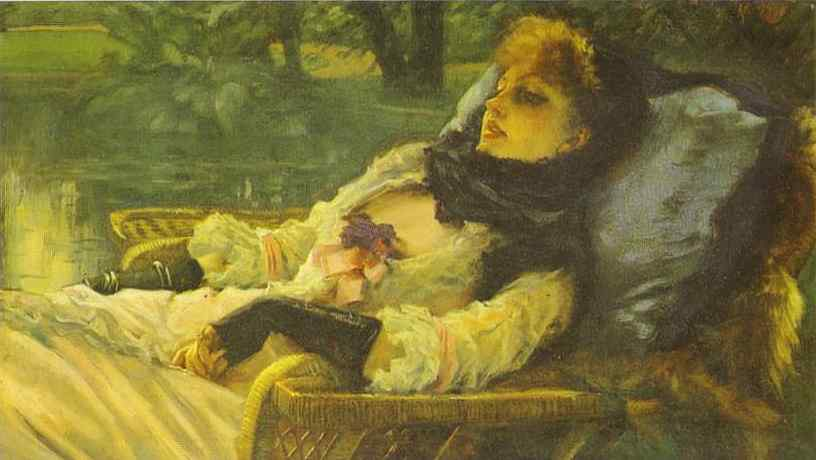
James Tissot, The Dreamer (Summer Evening), 1881.

In Jeune femme souffrante, one of Tissot's last paintings of her, Newton's health seems to have deteriorated rapidly. She and Tissot appear to have sought intercession and help from Catholic priests at Tissot's local church, Our Lady (now Lisson Grove), within a few minutes' walk of Tissot's house. Newton was baptised a Roman Catholic convert by Father Michael FitzGerald of Our Lady's on 6 November 1882.

Three days later, on 9 November—"with the ardent faith of a neophyte and the silent resignation of a saint", according to Tissot's 1906 biographer—Newton died in Tissot's arms. Her certified cause of death was "Phthisis" (a medical term for tuberculosis), and her death was registered on 11 November 1882 by Mary Pauline Hervey—"sister, In attendance [at death]". (Note: In her novel A Type of Beauty, Patricia O'Reilly depicts Newton killing herself with an overdose of laudanum because she can't bear to watch Tissot's grief, but this story has no factual basis, and Kathleen's conversion to Roman Catholicism shortly before her death rules out any possibility of suicide. Roman Catholic doctrine maintains that suicide is a mortal sin, condemning a person to eternal damnation and barring them from Heaven, whereas Tissot and Kathleen would have hoped and prayed to meet in Heaven now that both were baptised Catholics.) Lilian Hervey recalled that Tissot draped her coffin "in purple velvet, and prayed for hours before it".

== In fiction ==
- Burnett, Frances Hodgson. Kathleen: A Charming Love Story, T. B. Peterson & Brothers (1878). American painter Carl Seymour falls in love with young Kathleen, whom he calles "Kathleen Mavourneen", but his marriage proposal is rejected by her aunt. Only when Kathleen falls on hard times and becomes a governess do they meet again, with a happy ending.
- O'Reilly, Patricia. A Type of Beauty, the story of Kathleen Newton (1854–1882). Cape Press, 2010. ISBN 978-0-9563632-0-6
- Paquette, Lucy, The Hammock: A novel based on the true story of French painter James Tissot. Lucille Paquette Zuercher, 2012. ISBN (ePub) 978-0-615-68267-9. Lucille Paquette Zuercher, 2020. ISBN (pbk) 978-0-578-735222-1

== Sources ==
- Bastard, Georges, "Nos Peintres / James Tissot / Notes Intimes." Revue de Bretagne, November 1906. pp. 263–264.
- Newspaper reports of 1924 court case relating to the successful claim by Muriel Violet Mary Newton, Kathleen Newton's daughter, for a share of the late Dr Isaac Newton's estate.
- Ross, Marita, "The Truth About Tissot," Everybody's, 15 June 1946, p. 6. Article based on the recollections of Lilian Hervey, Kathleen Newton's niece.
- Misfeldt, Willard E., J. J. Tissot, Prints from the Gotlieb Collection, exh. cat. Virginia: Art Services International, 1991. ISBN 0-88397-097-X.
- Matyjaszkiewicz, Krystyna, "Tissot, Jacques Joseph (1836-1902)", Oxford Dictionary of National Biography (online ed.). Oxford University Press. http://www.oxforddnb.com [login required]. Accessed 1 May 2016.
- Buron, Melissa (ed.), James Tissot. San Francisco: Fine Arts Museums of San Francisco/DelMonico Books-Prestel, 2019. ISBN 978-3-7913-5919-9.
- Matyjaszkiewicz, Krystyna, "Solving the Mysteries of Kathleen Newton's life: New Findings and Facts", talk given at James Tissot: Fashion and Faith / Closing Weekend Symposium Pt. 2, 2020. https://www.youtube.com/watch?v=jTJ60uDnw3s
- Matyjaszkiewicz, Krystyna, "Kathleen Newton", in James Tissot. L'ambigu moderne, exh. cat. Paris: Établissement public des musées d'Orsay et de l'Orangerie, Paris, 2019. p. 166. ISBN 978-2-35433-311-9.
