= 1875 in art =

Events from the year 1875 in art.

== Events ==
- 3 May – The Royal Academy Exhibition of 1875 opens at Burlington House in London
- Claude Monet finishes painting his Snow at Argenteuil series.
- Foundation of the Art Students League of New York.
- Foundation of the Ruskin Gallery as the Museum of St George in a cottage in Walkley on the outskirts of Sheffield in the north of England by John Ruskin.

== Works ==
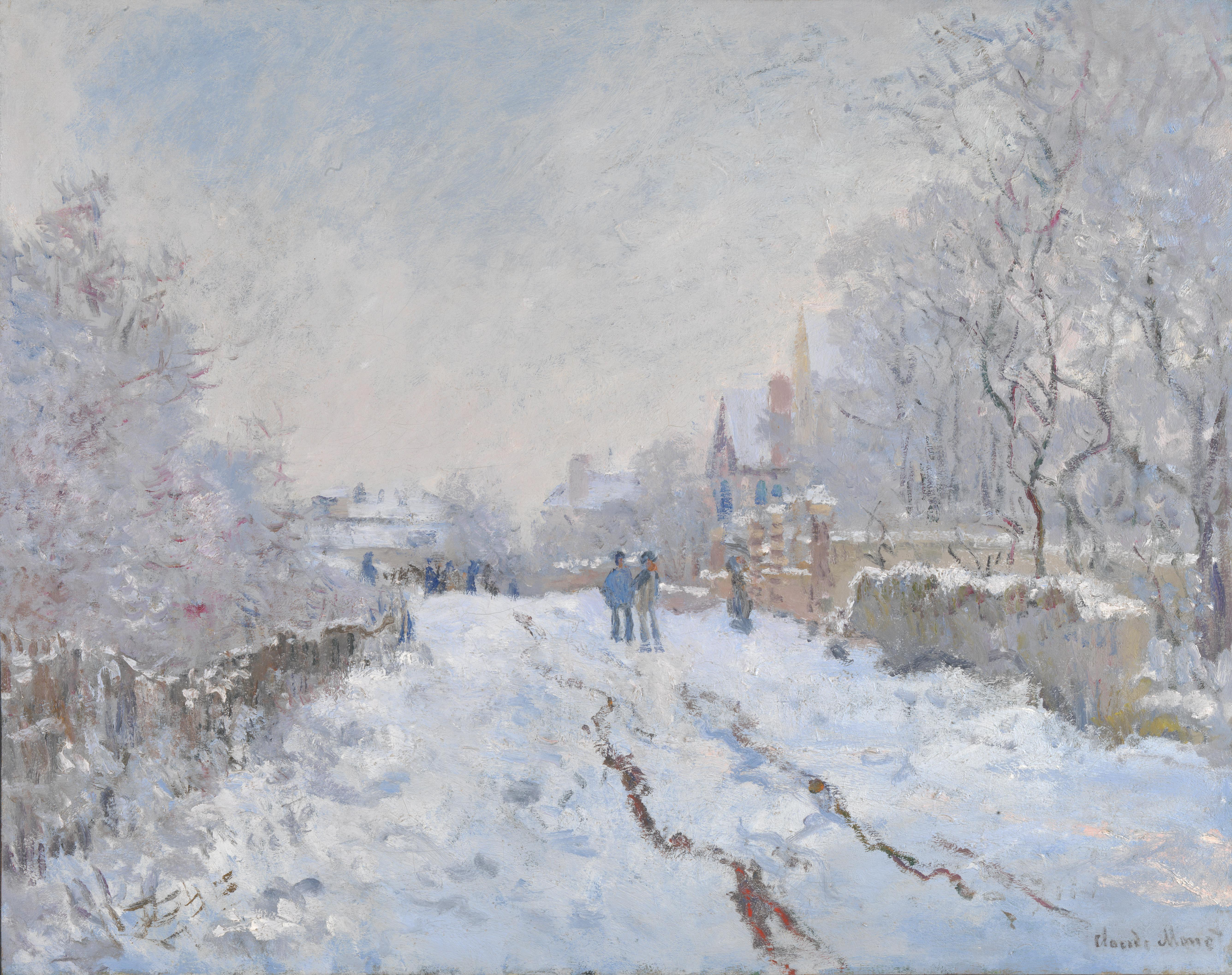
Monet – Snow at Argenteuil (1875) (National Gallery, London)

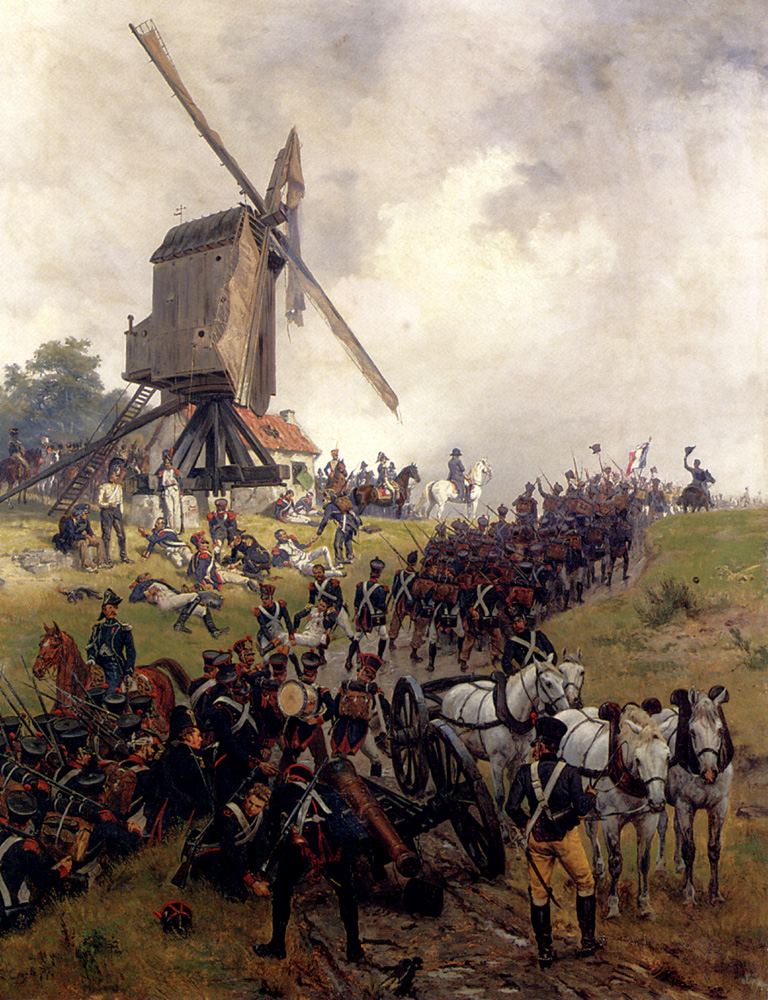
The Battle of Ligny by Ernest Crofts

- William-Adolphe Bouguereau – Flora and Zephyr
- Gustave Caillebotte
  - The Floor-scrapers
  - The Gardeners
  - The Yerres, effect of rain
  - Young Man at his Window (René Caillebotte)
- Julia Margaret Cameron – 'So like a shatter'd column lay the King'; the Passing of Arthur (photograph)
- Paul Cézanne - L'Après-midi à Naples
- Józef Chełmoński – Indian Summer
- Edward William Cooke – Naval Review in Honour of the Shah of Persia
- Ernest Crofts – The Battle Of Ligny
- Edgar Degas – Place de la Concorde (Viscount Lepic and his Daughters Crossing the Place de la Concorde)
- Giuseppe De Nittis
  - La Place des Pyramides, Paris
  - Westminster
- Thomas Eakins – The Gross Clinic
- William Powell Frith – In Naples, Portrait of the Artist
- Atkinson Grimshaw – Liverpool from Wapping
- James Clarke Hook – Hearts of Oak
- Louise Jopling – A Modern Cinderella
- Jean-Paul Laurens – L'Excommunication de Robert le Pieux (The Excommunication of Robert the Pious; Musée d'Orsay, Paris)
- Alexander Litovchenko – Ivan the Terrible shows his treasures to the British ambassador
- Edwin Long – The Babylonian Marriage Market
- Édouard Manet – illustrations for a French translation of Edgar Allan Poe's The Raven, by Stéphane Mallarmé
- John Jabez Edwin Mayall – Karl Marx (photograph; approximate date)
- Adolph Menzel – The Iron Rolling Mill (Modern Cyclops)
- Claude Monet
  - Argenteuil (Musée de l'Orangerie, Paris)
  - Camille Monet at her Tapestry
  - Train in the Snow
  - La Promenade, la femme a l'ombrelle (National Gallery of Art, Washington, D.C.)
- William Morris – Acanthus (wallpaper design)
- Erastus Dow Palmer – Robert R. Livingston (bronzes)
- Robert Reid – Civil War Memorial (Savannah, Georgia)
- Pierre-Auguste Renoir
  - The Lovers
  - Lunch at the Restaurant Fournaise (The Rowers' Lunch)
  - Nude in the Sun
  - Portrait of the Painter Claude Monet
  - Self-portrait
- Briton Rivière – The Last of the Garrison
- Joseph-Noël Sylvestre – The Death of Seneca
- Elizabeth Thompson – The 28th Regiment at Quatre Bras
- James Tissot
  - Hush!
  - The Bunch of Lilacs
- Hubert von Herkomer – The Last Muster
- James McNeill Whistler
  - Nocturne in Black and Gold – The Falling Rocket (approximate date)
  - Nocturne: Black and Gold – The Fire Wheel
- Archibald Willard – The Spirit of '76 (Yankee Doodle)
- J. Warrington Wood – Lillian Schnitzer Fountain, Houston, Texas

== Births ==
- March 13 – Lizzy Ansingh, Dutch painter (died 1959)
- March 27 – Albert Marquet, French painter (died 1947)
- July 31 – Jacques Villon, French Cubist painter and printmaker (died 1963)
- October 1 – Frank H. Mason, English marine and poster painter (died 1965)
- November 9 – Sir Hugh Lane, Irish art dealer and gallery founder (died 1915)
- November 13 – Jimmy Swinnerton, American cartoonist and artist (died 1974)
- November 24 – Louis Mathieu Verdilhan, French painter (died 1928)
- December 25 – Manuel Benedito, Spanish painter (died 1963)
- date unknown – Alexandros Christofis, Greek painter (died 1957)

== Deaths ==
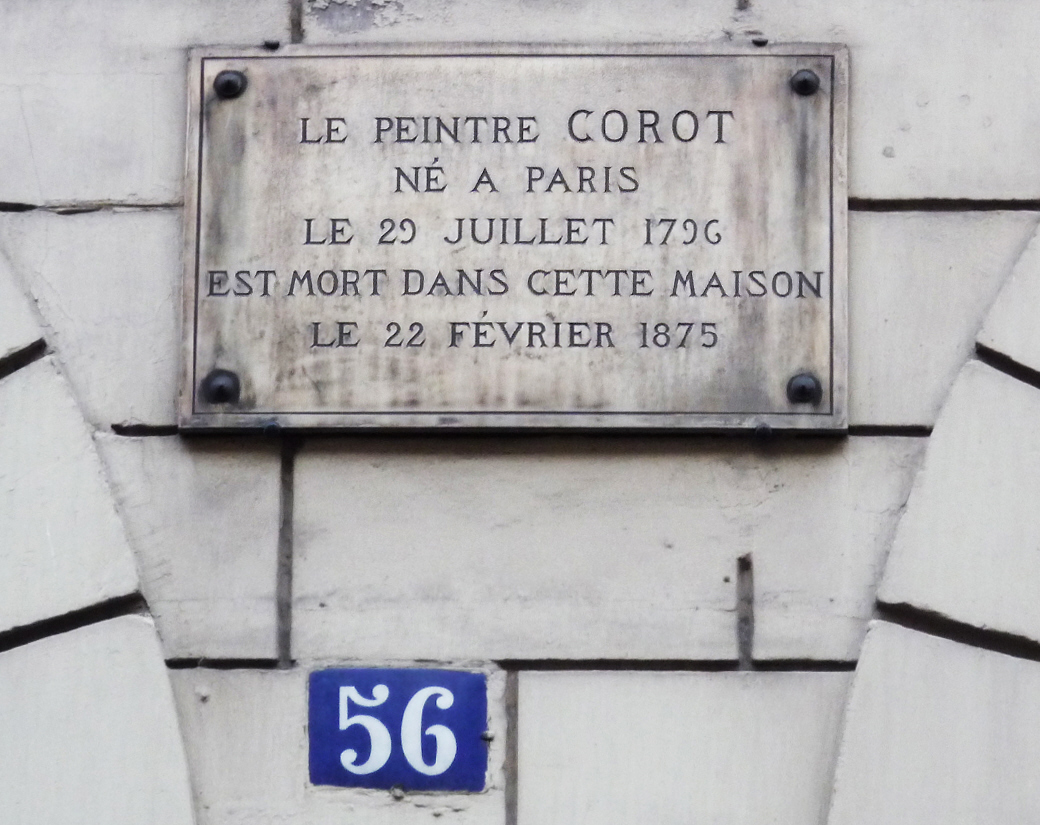
Plaque on the home of Camille Corot where he died aged 78 on 22 February 1875 at 56, rue du Faubourg-Poissionnière, 10th arrondissement of Paris

- January 18 – O. G. Rejlander, photographer in England (born 1813)
- January 20 – Jean-François Millet, French painter (born 1814)
- February – Auguste-Joseph Carrier, French miniature painter (born 1800)
- February 22 – Jean-Baptiste-Camille Corot, French painter (born 1796)
- February 28 – Sophia Isberg, Swedish woodcarver (born 1819)
- March 20 – January Suchodolski, Polish painter and Army officer (born 1797)
- April 13 – P. C. Skovgaard, Danish romantic nationalist landscape painter (born 1817)
- April 21 – Henry William Pickersgill, English painter specialising in portraits (born 1782)
- April 30 – Jean-Frédéric Waldeck, French artist and explorer (born 1766)
- May 1 – Alfred Stevens, English sculptor (born 1818)
- June 4 – Frederick Walker, English social realist painter (born 1840)
- June 25 – Antoine-Louis Barye, French sculptor (born 1796)
- July 9 – Christian Ruben, German painter (born 1805)
- September 11 – Fyodor Bruni, Russian painter of Italian descent (born 1799)
- September 12 – Paul Fischer, German portrait, miniature and landscape painter (born 1786)
- September 28 – Thomas Ender, Austrian painter (born 1793)
- October 12 – Jean-Baptiste Carpeaux, French painter and sculptor (born 1827)
- November 25 – Mary Harrison, English flower and fruit painter and illustrator (born 1788)
- December 10 – Ōtagaki Rengetsu, Japanese Buddhist nun and poet, potter, painter and calligrapher (born 1791)
