= Portrait of Louise Jopling =

Painting by John Everett Millais

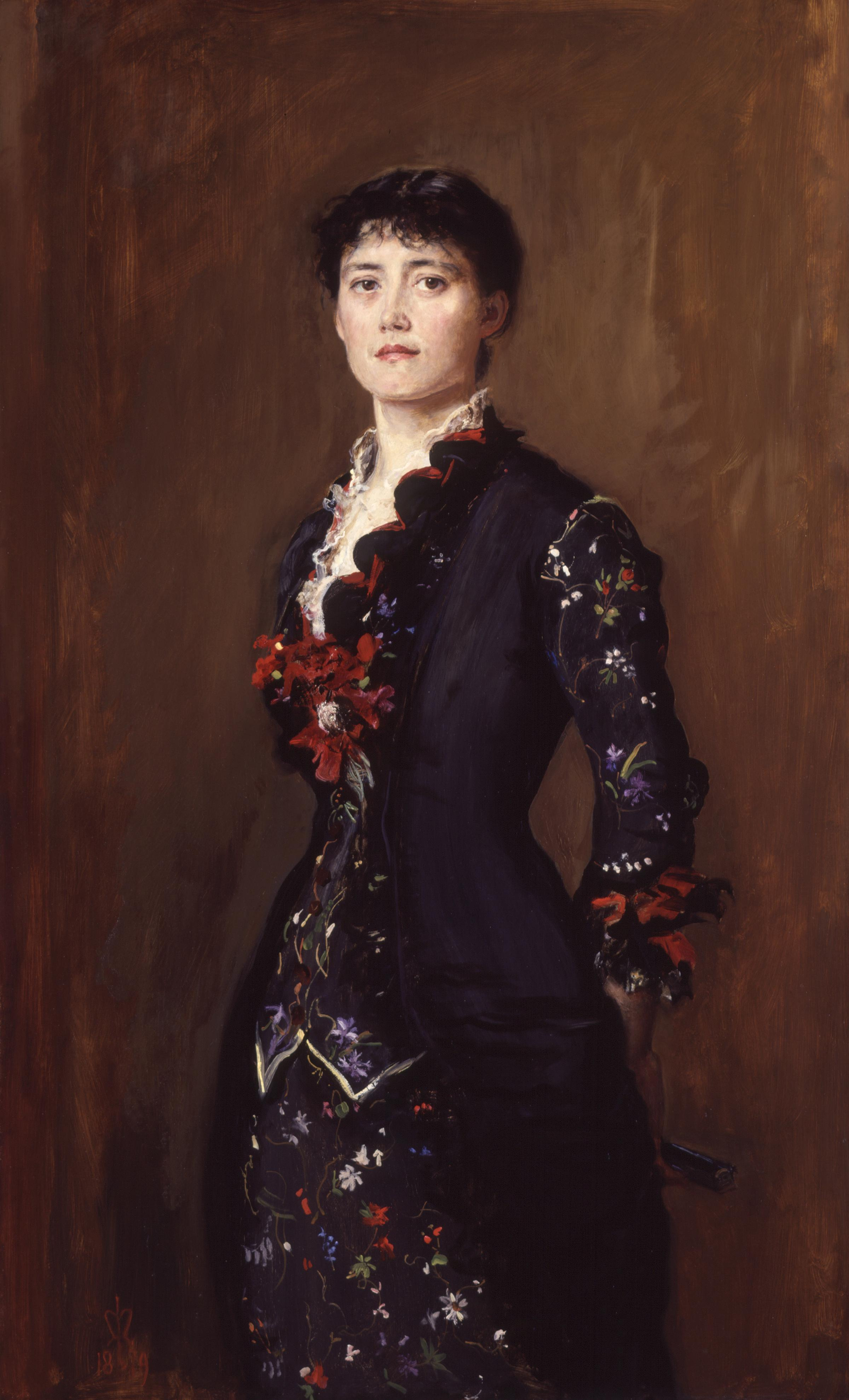
- Artist: John Everett Millais
- Year: 1879
- Type: Oil on canvas, portrait painting
- Dimensions: 124 cm × 76.5 cm (49 in × 30.1 in)
- Location: National Portrait Gallery, London

Portrait of Louise Jopling is an 1879 portrait painting by the British artist John Everett Millais. It depicts the English painter Louise Jopling.

The picture was displayed at the Grosvenor Gallery rather than at the Royal Academy Exhibition of 1880. It is now in the collection of the National Portrait Gallery Having been acquired in 2002 with the assistance of the Art Fund and the National Lottery Heritage Fund.

== See also ==
- List of paintings by John Everett Millais

== Bibliography ==
- Denney, Coleen. The Suffrage Photography of Lena Connell: Creating a Cult of Great Women Leaders in Britain, 1908-1914. Macfarland, 2021
- De Montfort, Patricia. Louise Jopling: A Biographical and Cultural Study of the Modern Woman Artist in Victorian Britain. Taylor & Francis, 2017.
