= Grosvenor Gallery Library =

Circulating library in London, England

Coordinates: 51.5137°N 0.1480°W

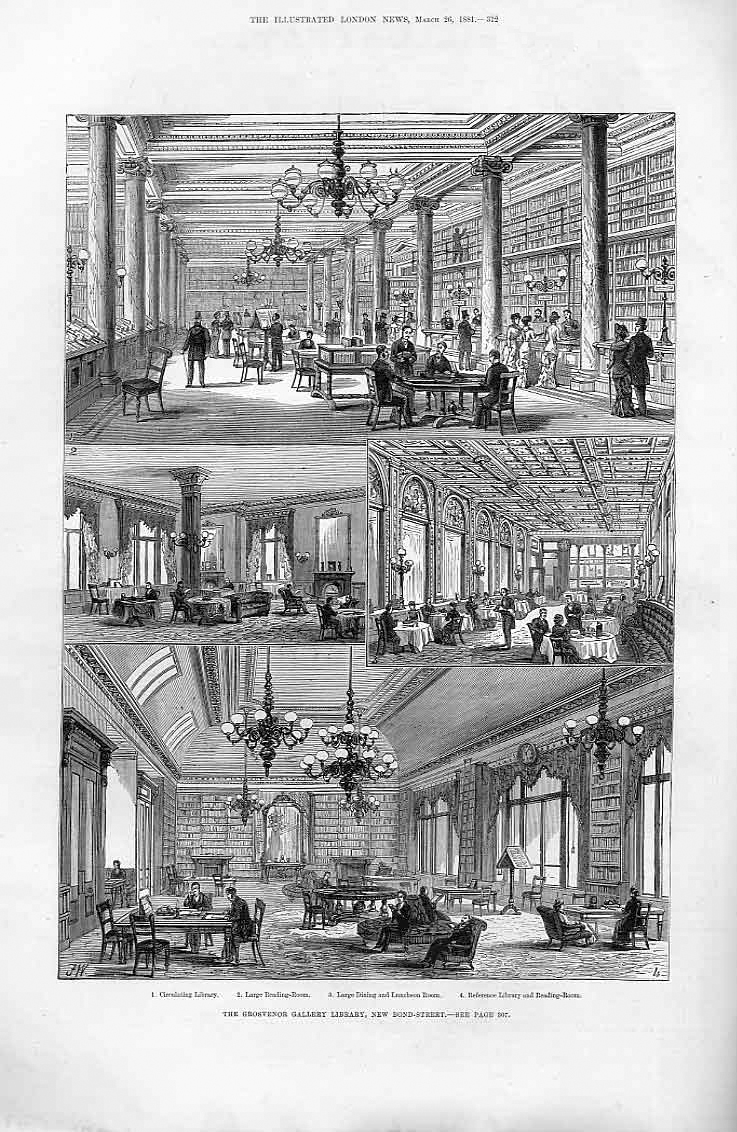
The Grosvenor Gallery Library published in The Illustrated London News, 26 March 1881."1. Circulating Library 2. Large Reading-Room 3. Large Dining and Luncheon Room 4. Reference Library and Reading-Room"

The Grosvenor Gallery Library (est. 1880) was a circulating library in London in the late 19th century. It was affiliated with the Grosvenor Gallery of art on Bond Street, later moving to South Molton Street. It offered subscribers current periodicals, new books, and a Ladies' Reading Room. Owners and staff included Miss Brinstingl, Coutts Lindsay, Mrs. A.W. Pollard, and Thomas Verrinder.
