= The Gentle Art of Making Enemies =

Book by the painter James McNeill Whistler

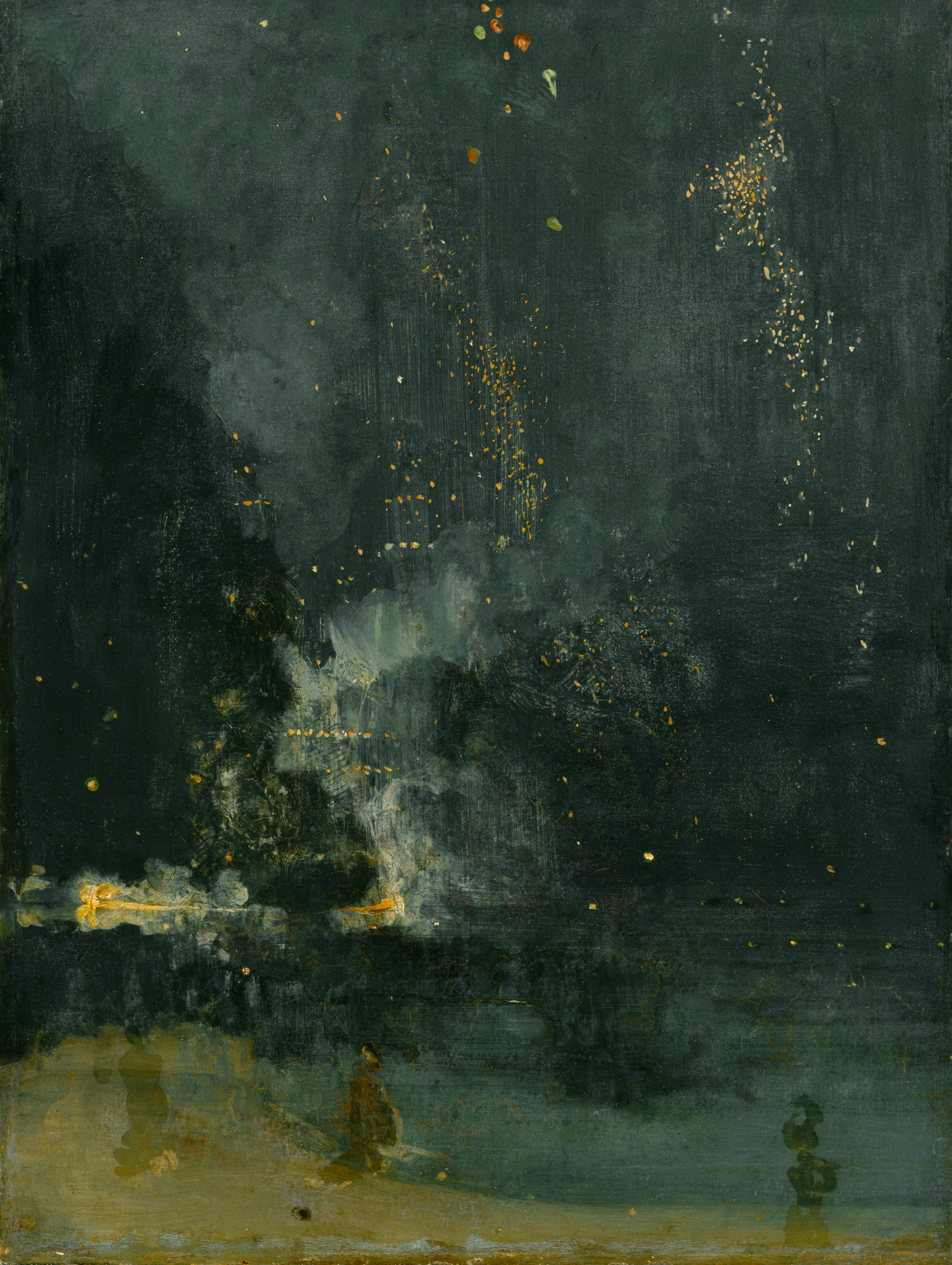
Nocturne in Black and Gold – The Falling Rocket by James McNeill Whistler. Whistler sued Ruskin over his criticism of the painting.

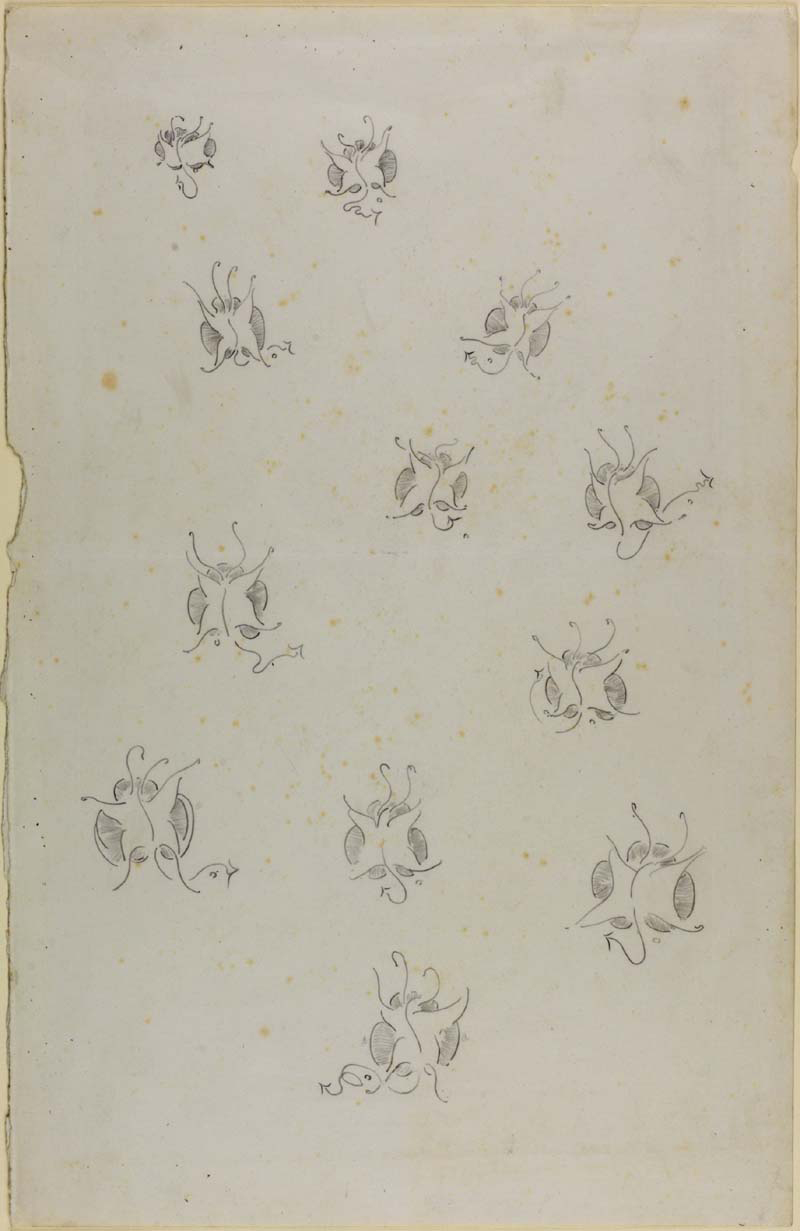
Butterflies designed for the illustration of the book (c. 1890)

The Gentle Art of Making Enemies is a book by the painter James McNeill Whistler, published in London in 1890 by William Heinemann, who also published a second, enlarged edition in 1892. The book was in part a response to, in part a transcript of, Whistler's famous libel suit against critic John Ruskin. Ruskin, in a review of the inaugural showing at the Grosvenor Gallery, had referred to Whistler's painting Nocturne in Black and Gold – The Falling Rocket as "flinging a pot of paint in the public's face". The book contains Whistler's letters to newspapers chronicling his many petty grievances against various acquaintances and friends, and it contains his famous 1885 lecture, "Ten O'Clock", explaining "the meaning and purpose of art".

Whistler biographer Stanley Weintraub suggests the book was controversial enough that Whistler might have been better known for it than for his art at the time of his death.
