= Lillian Schnitzer Fountain =

Fountain and sculpture in Texas, US

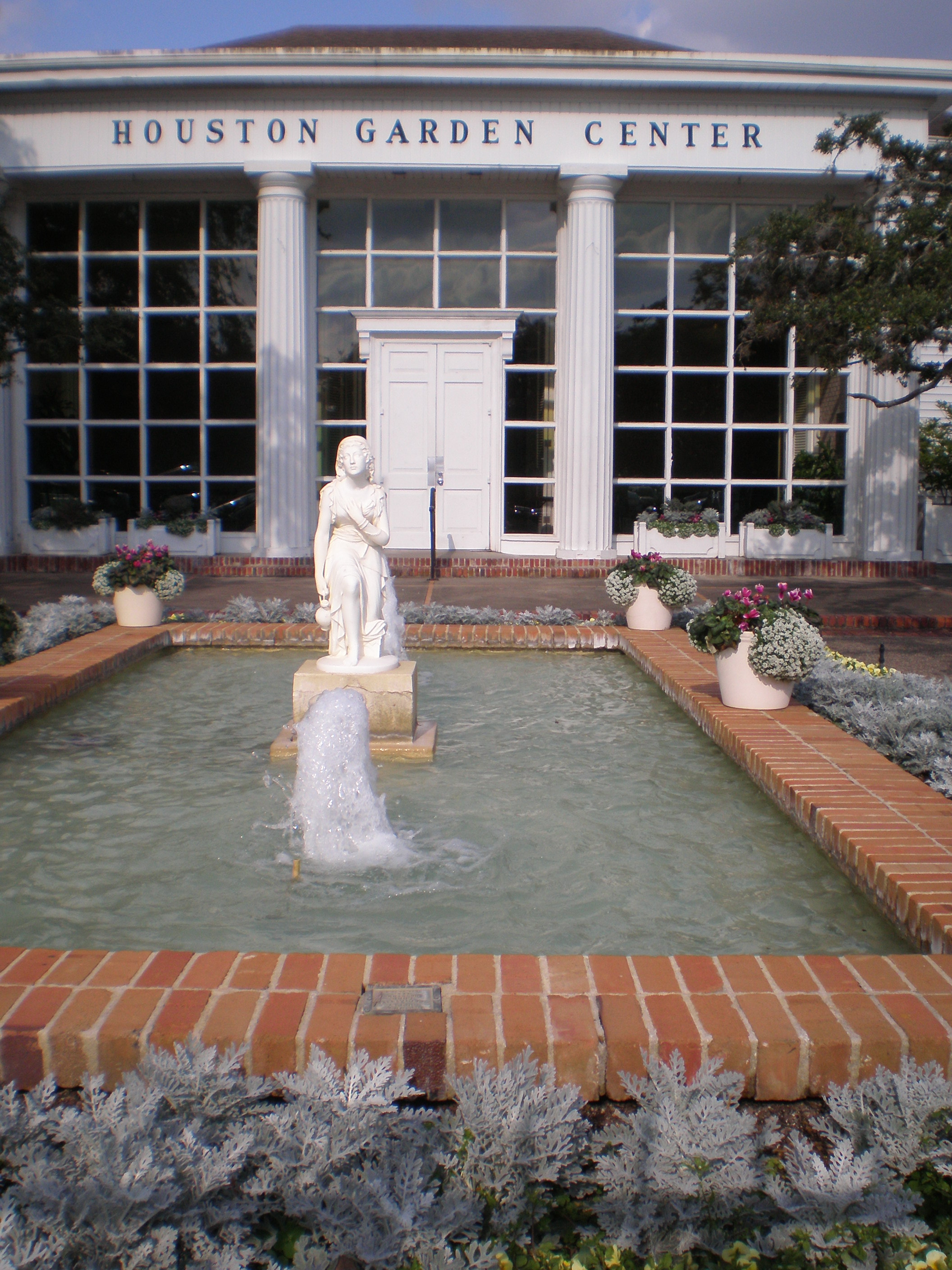
- The fountain and sculpture in 2008
- Artist: J. Warrington Wood
- Year: 1875
- Type: Fountain, sculpture
- Medium: Bronze, concrete, granite
- Location: Houston, Texas, United States; 29°43′16.7″N 95°23′12.6″W

Lillian Schnitzer Fountain is an outdoor 1875 fountain and bronze sculpture by J. Warrington Wood, installed outside Hermann Park's Houston Garden Center in Houston, Texas, United States. The work was created in Rome and dedicated in Lillian Schnitzer's memory in 1964 by George Schnitzer.

The statue depicts a kneeling woman and rests on a granite pedestal and concrete base. She holds a water jug in her proper right hand and has her opposite arm raised to her chest. The sculpture is set within a brick-lined pool, which displays a plaque that reads: In Memory of Lillian Schnitzer '…A Spirit Still and Bright with Something of an Angel Light 1964.' Another plaque at the rear of the pools displays the text: Sculptured in Rome 1875 J. Warrington Wood.

== See also ==
- 1875 in art
- List of public art in Houston
