= Statue of Robert R. Livingston =

Statue in the U.S. Capitol

Robert R. Livingston
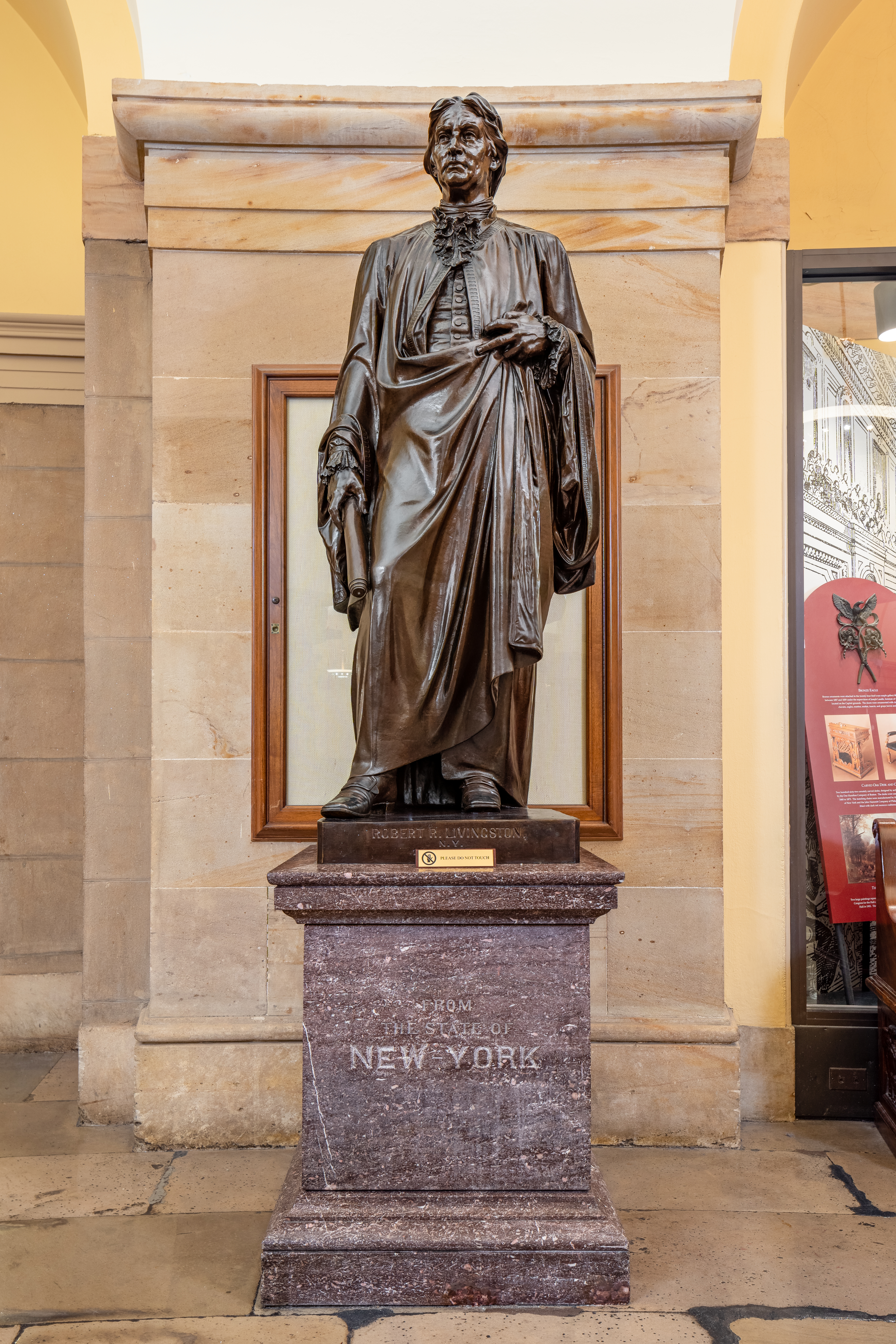
- The statue at the U.S. Capitol crypt in 2022
- Artist: Erastus Dow Palmer
- Medium: Bronze sculpture
- Subject: Robert R. Livingston
- Location: Washington, D.C., U.S.

Robert R. Livingston is an 1875 bronze sculpture of Robert R. Livingston, one of the Founding Fathers of the United States, executed by the New York born sculptor Erastus Dow Palmer. The state is installed in the United States Capitol, in Washington, D.C., as part of the National Statuary Hall Collection. It is one of two statues donated by the state of New York.

== History ==
In 1873, after receiving the commission to create the Livingston statue, Palmer moved to Paris to work on the statue. This was a departure from the usual tendency of American artists of the time to place themselves in Rome, a trend that was to accelerate in the coming years. There he worked on modeling and then casting his work before returning it and himself to the United States. In comparing this statue with others in the collection, the art historian E. Wayne Craven noted, “The statue of Livingston, though slightly larger than life, is dwarfed by surrounding giants in marble and bronze, but few can approach it in quality. For many of the other statues, their inadequacies become all the more obvious as they increase in size, whereas the one of Livingston wears well.”

Webster in his biography and catalogue of Palmer's works reveals that the sculptor first produced a nude study of Livingston (with fig leaf) prior to executing the clothed statue, which was a common practice at the time.

In Paris, Palmer made two casts of the work, one bound for the Capitol, the other for the New York Court of Appeals in Albany. A plaster version was placed in Livingston Hall at the State University of New York at Albany. One of the two versions was exhibited at the Centennial International Exhibition in Philadelphia and was awarded a first class medal. Since the Exposition was held in 1876 and the statue in Washington was unveiled in 1875, it is likely that it was the Albany statue or the Albany plaster that was shown in Philadelphia.

== See also ==
- 1875 in art
