= Joseph Middleton Jopling =

English watercolour painter

Joseph Middleton Jopling (1831 – 1884) was an English painter.

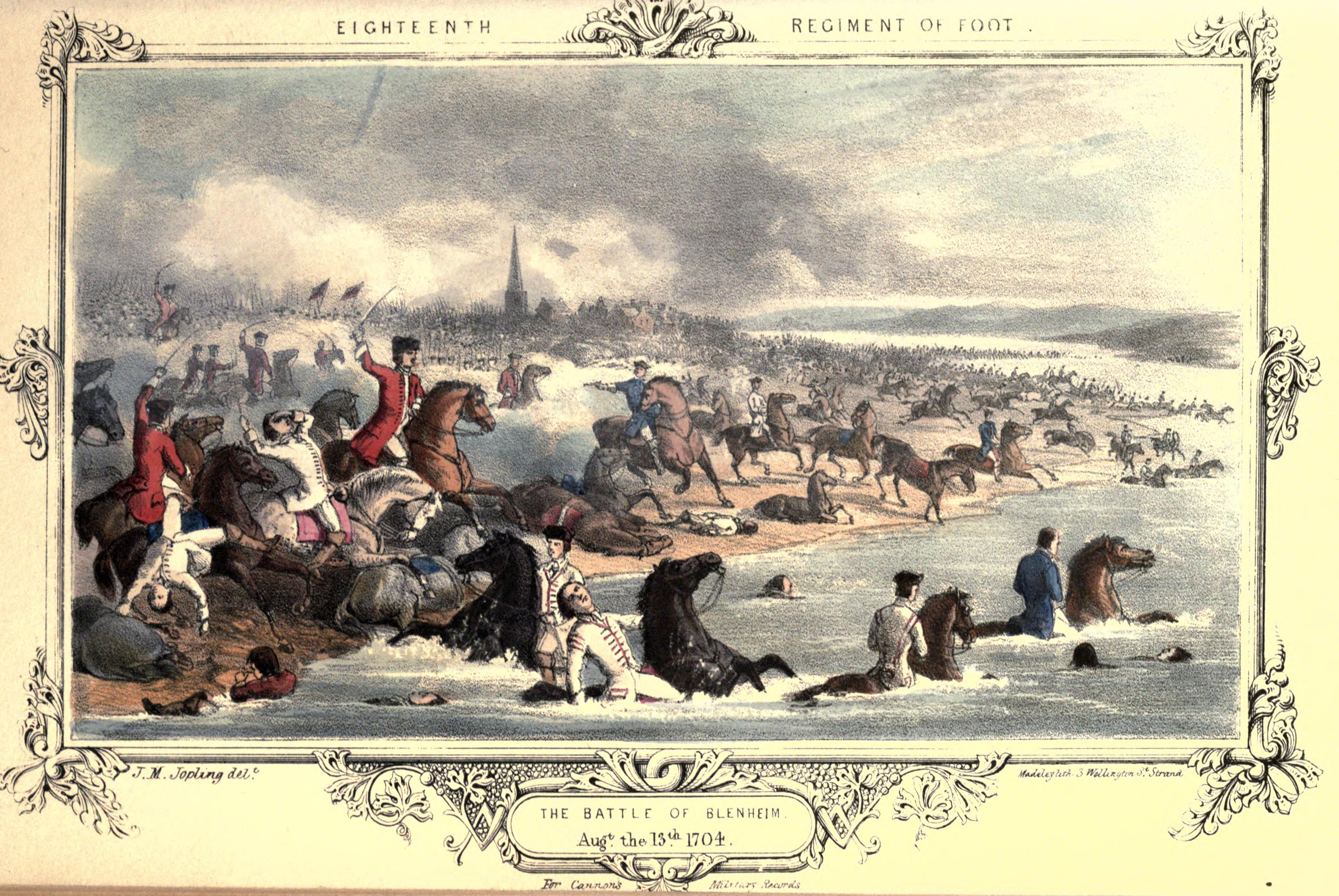
The Battle of Blenheim (1848)

Joseph Middleton Jopling, born in 1831, was son of Joseph Jopling, a clerk in the Horse Guards, Whitehall, and occupied a similar position from the age of seventeen for some years. Though self-taught, he was a clever painter in water-colours, and in 1859 was elected an associate of the New Society of Painters in Water-colours, but resigned in 1876. Jopling was an active member of the 3rd Middlesex Volunteers, and distinguished himself frequently in the National Rifle competitions at Wimbledon, winning the Queen's Prize in 1861. He was employed officially to make drawings of the Queen reviewing the troops. At the time of the Philadelphia International Exposition, Jopling acted as director of the fine art section. He was a frequent exhibitor at the Royal Academy and other exhibitions, sending many historical or domestic pictures and also pictures of flowers and fruit. In Liverpool there is a picture by him, Starry Eyes, in the permanent collection. Jopling was one of the earliest members of the Arts Club, Hanover Square.

He died in December 1884. He married in 1874 Louise Goode (later Mrs. Rowe), herself an artist of distinction, by whom he left one son.

== Bibliography ==
- Cust, Lionel Henry (1892). "Jopling, Joseph Middleton" . In Lee, Sidney (ed.). Dictionary of National Biography. Vol. 30. London: Smith, Elder & Co. p. 192.
- "Joseph Middleton Jopling". National Portrait Gallery. Accessed 24 February 2022.
