= The Fire Wheel =

Painting by James McNeill Whistler

- Artist: James McNeill Whistler
- Year: c.1875
- Type: Oil on canvas, landscape painting
- Dimensions: 76.2 cm × 54.3 cm (30.0 in × 21.4 in)
- Location: Tate Britain, London

Nocturne: Black and Gold - The Fire Wheel is an 1875 oil painting by the American-born artist James McNeill Whistler. It was one of six nocturnes he painted featuring Cremorne Gardens in Chelsea. Whistler himself lived nearby in Lindsey Row. Both this and The Falling Rocket portray the fireworks displays held in the pleasure gardens, each a distinctly abstract view along the River Thames. It was displayed at the Grosvenor Gallery Exhibition of 1883. The painting is in the collection of the Tate Britain having been bequeathed to the nation by Arthur Studd in 1919.

== See also ==
- List of paintings by James McNeill Whistler

== Bibliography ==
- Chaleyssin, Patrick. James McNeill Whistler. Parkstone International, 2011.
- Jacobi, Carol (ed.) James McNeill Whistler. Tate Publishing, 2026.
- Merrill, Linda. After Whistler: The Artist and His Influence on American Painting. Yale University Press, 2003.
- Sutherland, Daniel E. Whistler: A Life for Art's Sake. Yale University Press, 2014.
