= Louise Jopling =

English painter

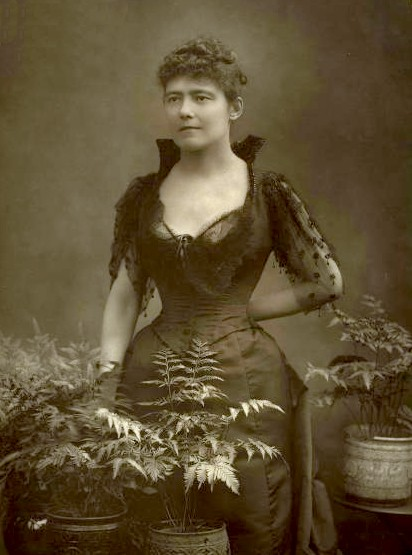
- Photograph of Louise Jopling by Herbert Rose Barraud
- Born: Louise Jane Goode; 16 November 1843; Manchester, United Kingdom
- Died: 19 November 1933 (aged 90); Chesham Bois, United Kingdom
- Known for: Painting
- Spouse(s): Frank Romer; Joseph Middleton Jopling; George W. Rowe
- Children: Percy Romer; Lindsay Millais Jopling

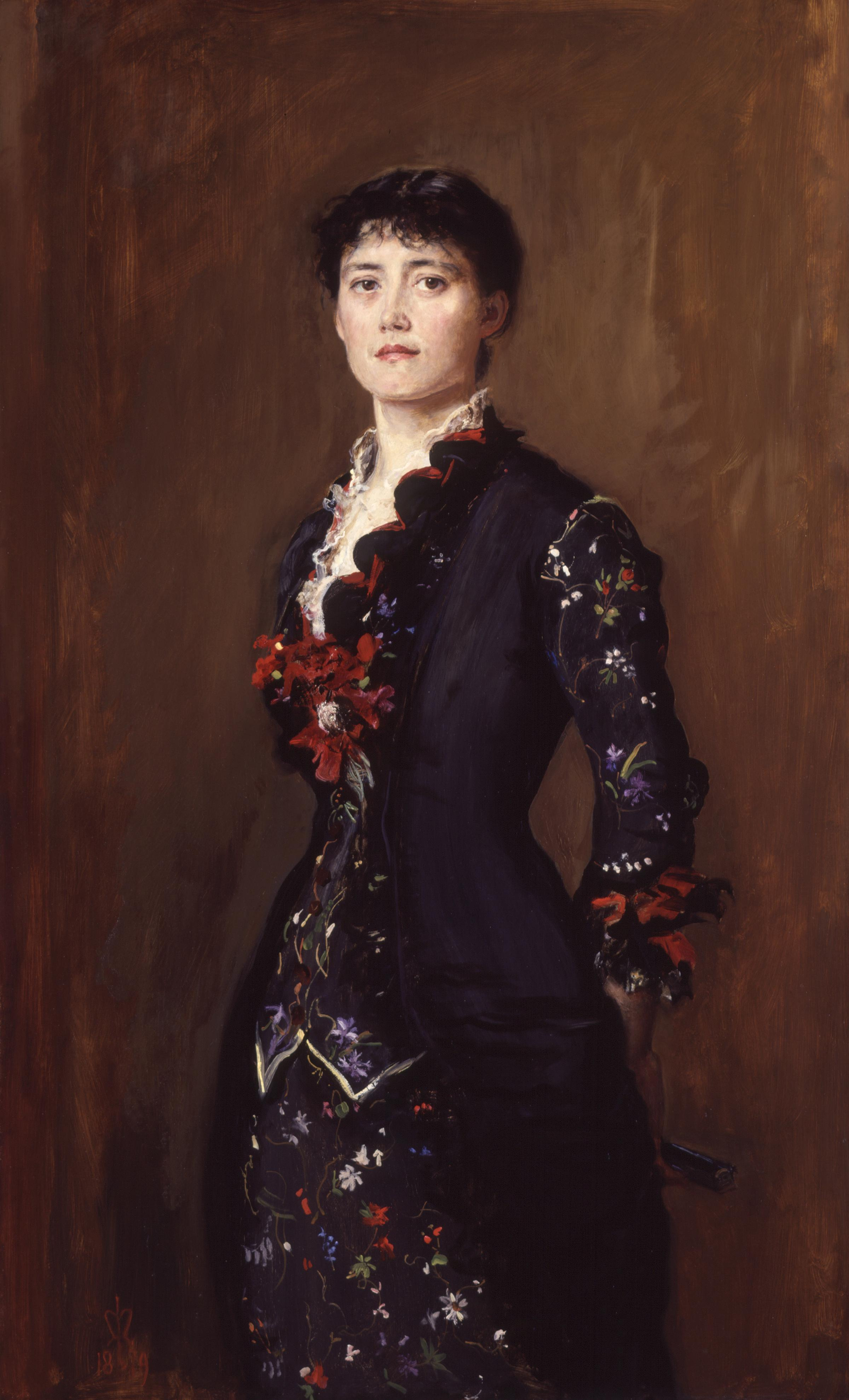
Portrait of Louise Jopling by John Everett Millais, 1879

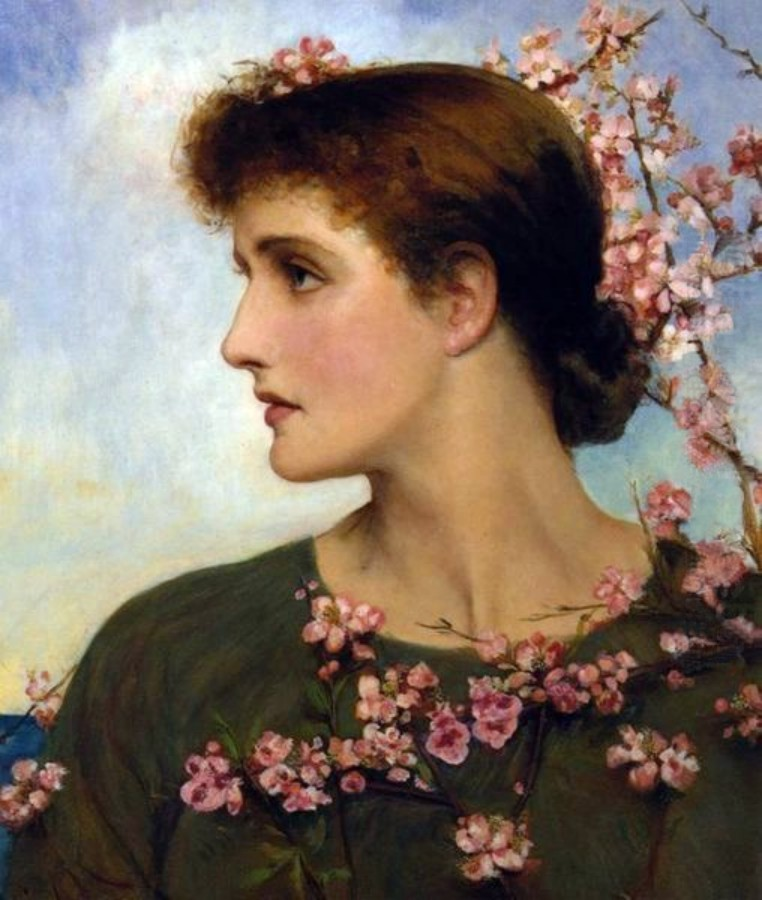
"Phyllis" by Louise Jopling

Louise Jane Jopling (née Goode, previously Romer and later Rowe) (Manchester 16 November 1843 – 19 November 1933) was an English painter of the Victorian era, and one of the most prominent women artists of her generation.

== Early life ==
Louise Jane Goode was born in Manchester, the fifth of the nine children of railway contractor Thomas Smith "T.S." Goode and his wife Frances. She was married at seventeen to civil servant Francis "Frank" Romer. The Baroness de Rothschild, a connection of Romer's, encouraged Louise to pursue and develop her art. In the later 1860s, she studied in Paris with Charles Joshua Chaplin and Alfred Stevens, and first exhibited her work at the Salon. She entered works into the Royal Academy shows, 1870–73 (as Louise Romer). After Romer's death in 1872, she married Vanity Fair artist Joseph Middleton Jopling in 1874, who was best man at Whistler's wedding to Beatrix Godwin. Of the children from her first marriage only one son, Percy Romer, survived childhood. She had another son, Lindsay Millais Jopling, by her second marriage; the child was named after his two godfathers Sir Coutts Lindsay, founder of the Grosvenor Gallery, and John Everett Millais.

Jopling achieved fair success in her career: her painting Five O'Clock Tea was sold for £400 in 1874. Her Five Sisters of York was shown at the Philadelphia Exposition in 1876, and her A Modern Cinderella at the Paris Exposition of 1878. Yet she was not immune to the gender discrimination of her time: in 1883 she sought a portrait commission for 150 guineas, but lost it to Sir John Everett Millais, who was paid 1000 guineas for the same project. Jopling exhibited her work at the Palace of Fine Arts and The Woman's Building at the 1893 World's Columbian Exposition in Chicago, Illinois.

She joined the Society of Women Artists (1880) and the Royal Society of Portrait Painters (1891); alongside Lucy Kemp-Welch she became one of the first women to be admitted to the Royal Society of British Artists (1901). During the years of her marriage with Jopling, she became the primary earner of the family. It is said that, "She found this responsibility weighty and stressful, necessitating constant production, regular sales and a continual search for commissions and clients. In 1879, despite her own illness and that of her son Percy, she produced eighteen works."

== Social life ==
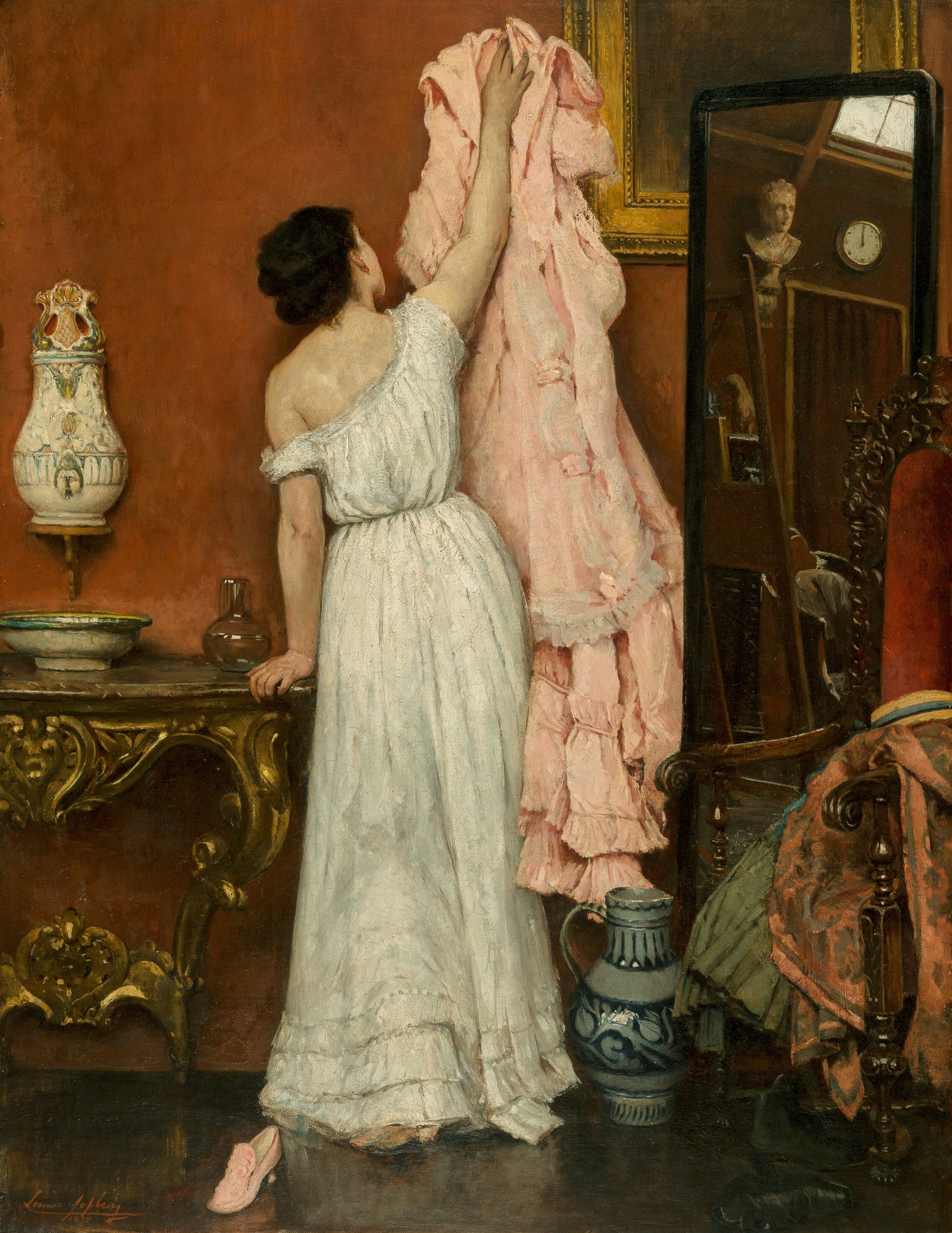
A Modern Cinderella, 1875

Jopling "painted portraits of titled sitters, wealthy financiers and actresses" and, to operate in this social milieu, she maintained a fashionable lifestyle, with a Chelsea studio at 28 Beaufort Street, designed by William Burges. She moved in a social circle that included James McNeill Whistler, Oscar Wilde, Kate Perugini (née Dickens) and Ellen Terry. Augustus Dubourg dedicated his 1892 play Angelica to her. In 1887 the society magazine The Lady’s World described her social circle,

One year we have her portrait, magnificently sketched by Millais, adorning the walls of the Grosvenor; next season she figures as the heroine of a ‘society’ novel from the pen of a popular writer. One week we see her salon drawn by Mr. Du Maurier in Punch, with sketches from the life of herself and her friends; the week after she appears under another name as the heroine of one of those quasi-malicious town and country tales which amuse the readers of a society paper… Over the mantelpiece hangs the portrait, by her old friend Sir John Millais, which made such a sensation at the Grosvenor a year or two ago…Here Mr. James Whistler and Mr. Oscar Wilde are always to be found, discussing the eternal problems of art; while Sir John Millais, Mr. Sargent and Mr. George Boughton are sworn allies of the subject of our sketch. The Ladies Archibald and Walter Campbell rarely miss a party.

It was at an 1883 party at the Joplings' house that Whistler had a famous exchange with Oscar Wilde. In response to a witticism of Whistler's, Wilde remarked, "How I wish I had said that." Whistler replied, "You will, Oscar, you will."

Like some other women painters (Kate Perugini and Marie Spartali Stillman are examples), Jopling also served as a model and subject for other artists. Both Millais and James Abbott McNeill Whistler painted portraits of her. Whistler praised Millais' picture as "a great work" and "a superb portrait."

== Later life ==
Joseph Jopling died in 1884 and Louise married lawyer George W. Rowe in 1887, continuing to use Jopling's name professionally. She established her own school of painting for women and, also in 1887, wrote several pieces on the subject of art teaching. She championed the right of female art students to work directly from live models as the Royal Academy only allowed its female students to observe male models "carefully draped" in 1893, and her friend Whistler distributed the prizes at her school.

Louise Jopling was a long-term supporter of the National Union of Women's Suffrage Societies, and active in feminist causes. She served as a vice-president of the Healthy and Artistic Dress Union, a short-lived organization promoting dress reform during the 1890s and early 1900s. She published a book of art instruction, and an autobiography, Twenty Years of My Life. She also wrote some poetry and journalism.
