= Walter Launt Palmer =

American painter

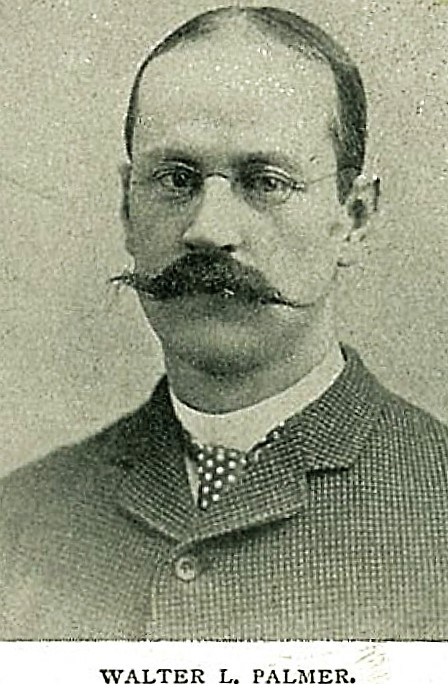
- Born: August 1, 1854; Albany, New York
- Died: April 16, 1932 (aged 77); Albany, New York
- Education: Frederic Edwin Church, Carolus-Duran
- Notable work: Winter landscape scenes
- Movement: American Impressionist
- Awards: Second Hallgarten Prize (1887); Member of the National Academy of Design (1887)

Walter Launt Palmer (August 1, 1854 – April 16, 1932) was an American Impressionist painter. Palmer's father Erastus Dow Palmer was a prominent sculptor, and the family residence was frequented by his father's friends, notably Frederic Edwin Church. Palmer began his formal artistic training under portrait painter Charles Loring Elliott, but it was Church, the period's premier landscape artist, who later tutored the young Palmer in landscape painting.

In 1873, Palmer made one of many trips abroad in order to work with Carolus-Duran. It was at this time that he met one of Carolus-Duran's other young students, John Singer Sargent. The artist continued to take frequent and lengthy trips to Europe, and acquired a growing interest in French Impressionism as well as an enduring attraction to Venetian subjects. When Palmer returned to the United States, he spent most of his time in Albany, where artists like William and James Hart, Homer Dodge Martin, and Edward Gay also painted. Here, Palmer began painting building interiors, his first significant series of work. He also spent some time working out of New York City at the Tenth Street Studio Building.

Palmer's most notable works are winter landscape scenes, a tradition he continued from the mid-1880s to the end of his life. For these accomplishments he has been called the "painter of the American winter." Exhibitions featuring Palmer's work have included Hawthorne Fine Art's A Perfect Solitude: The Art of Walter Launt Palmer (1854–1932) (December 12, 2006 – February 10, 2007) and the Albany Institute of History & Art's Walter Launt Palmer: Painting the Moment (March 28 - August 16, 2015).

== Exhibitions ==
Palmer's works were exhibited in group shows and solo exhibitions throughout his career. Many of his works are collectable and can be found in museums and private collections worldwide.

- Universelle Exposition, Paris, 1900
- Corcoran Gallery of Art, Washington, D.C., 1908, 1910, 1912
- Albright Art Gallery, Buffalo, 1906

== Prizes ==
- Second Hallgarten Prize for January, National Academy of Design, 1887.
- First Prize, Columbian World Fair, Chicago, 1893.
- Gold Medal for March Twilight, Philadelphia Art Club, 1894.
- Gold Medal for La Salute by Moonlight, Boston Art Club, 1895.
- W.T. Evans Prize, American Watercolor Society, 1895.
- Silver Medal, Pan-American Exposition, Buffalo, 1901.
- Silver Medal, St. Louis Exposition, 1904 (for watercolor).
- Bronze Medal for Across the Fields, St. Louis Exposition, 1904 .
- Silver Medal, Philadelphia Art Club, 1907.
- Butler Prize for Silent Dawn, Art Institute of Chicago, 1919.
- Elected into the National Academy of Design, 1887.

== Gallery ==
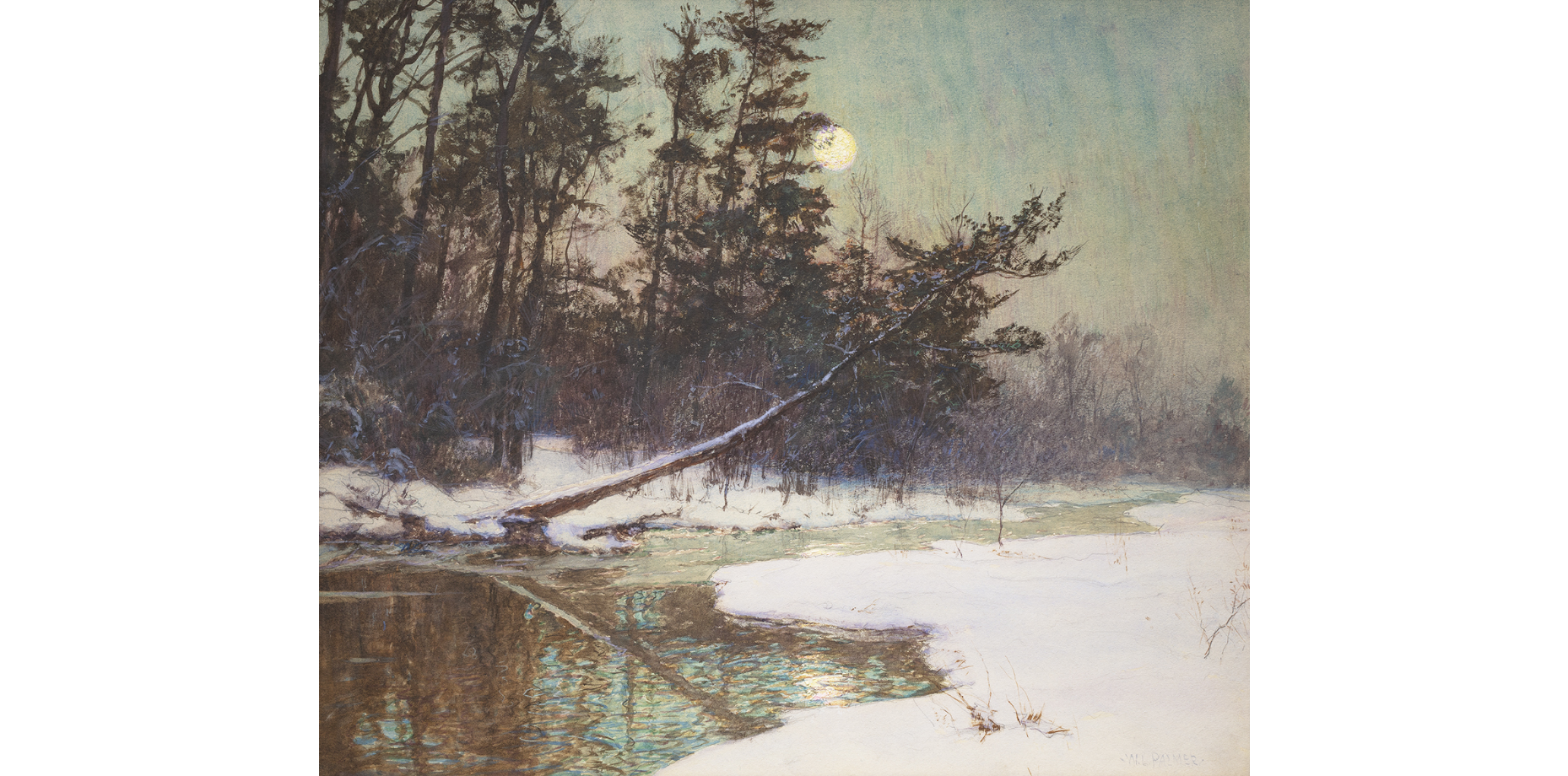
Moonrise Over a Snowy Landscape, late 19th Century watercolor, gouache, and crayon on paper laid down on board.

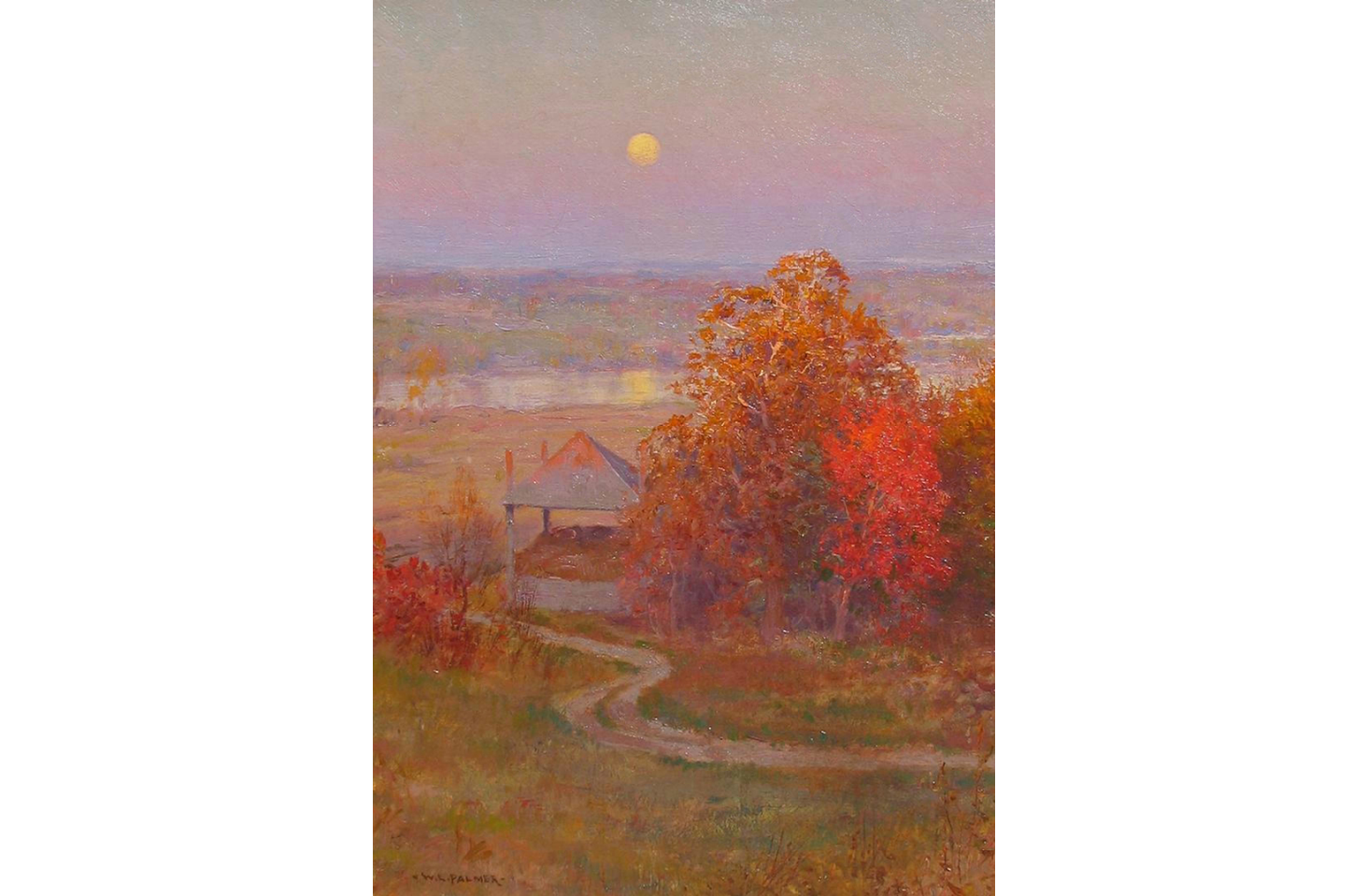
Autumn Moonrise, ca. 1910, Oil on canvas.
