= The Bunch of Lilacs =

Painting by James Tissot

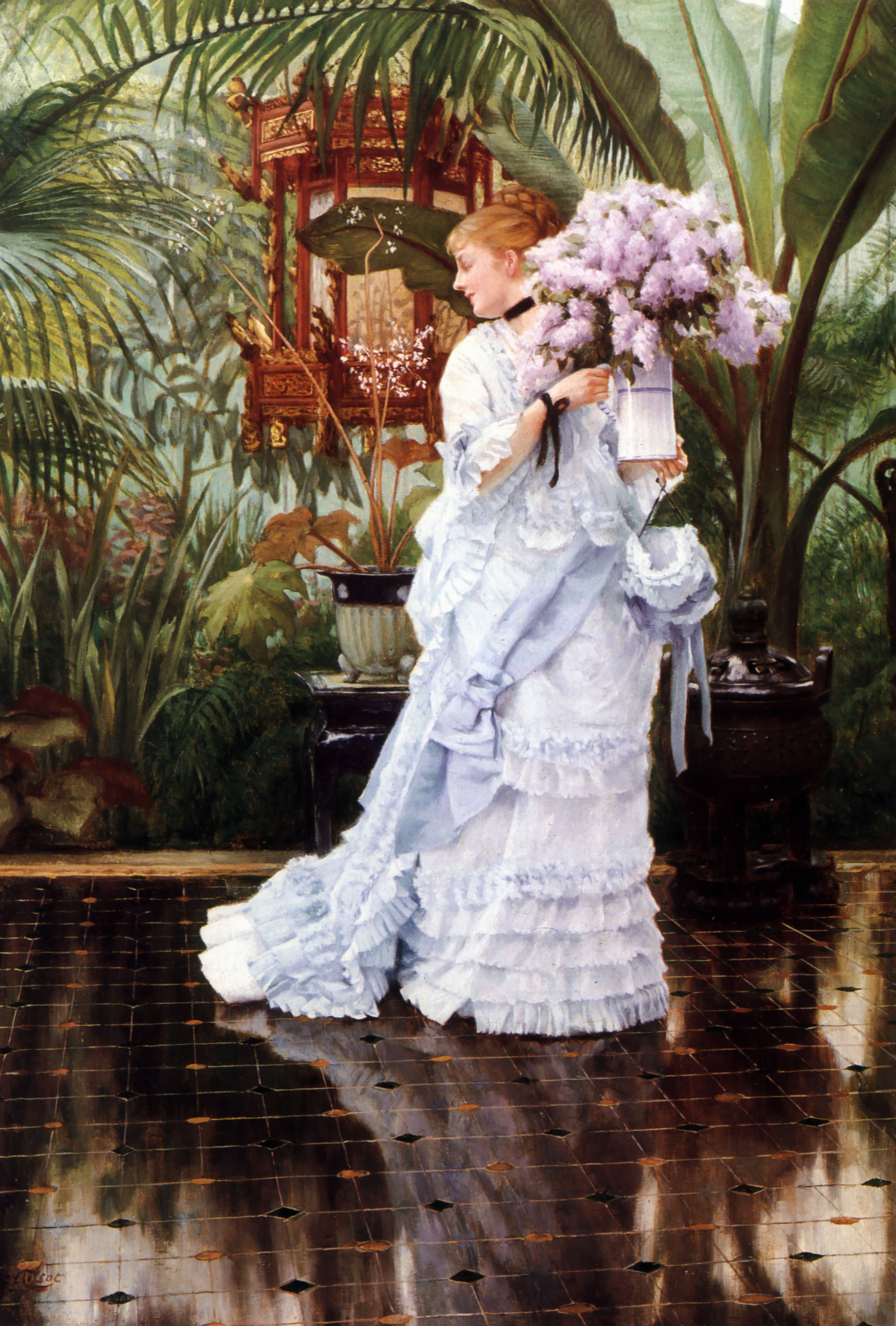
- Artist: James Tissot
- Year: 1875
- Type: Oil on canvas, genre painting
- Dimensions: 50.8 cm × 35.6 cm (20.0 in × 14.0 in)
- Location: Private collection

The Bunch of Lilacs is an oil painting on canvas by the French artist James Tissot, from 1875. It is held in a private collection.

It depicts a fashionably-dressed young woman, with a joyful expression, walking through a conservatory, carrying a vase filled with lilacs. Tissot produced the work during the decade he spent in England, featuring stylish images of Victorian era life. It was one of a number of pictures he produced set in greenhouses. The painting was displayed at the Royal Academy Exhibition of 1875 held at Burlington House in London, along with another of Tissot's works Hush!.

== Bibliography ==
- Ash, Russell. James Tissot. Pavilion, 1992.
- Marshall, Nancy Rose & Warner, Malcolm. James Tissot: Victorian Life, Modern Love. Yale University Press, 1999.
- Novakov, Anna. Imagined Utopias in the Built Environment: From London’s Vauxhall Garden to the Black Rock Desert. Cambridge Scholars Publishing, 2017.
- Wentworth, Michael. James Tissot. Clarendon Press, 1984.
