= Coutts Lindsay =

English painter

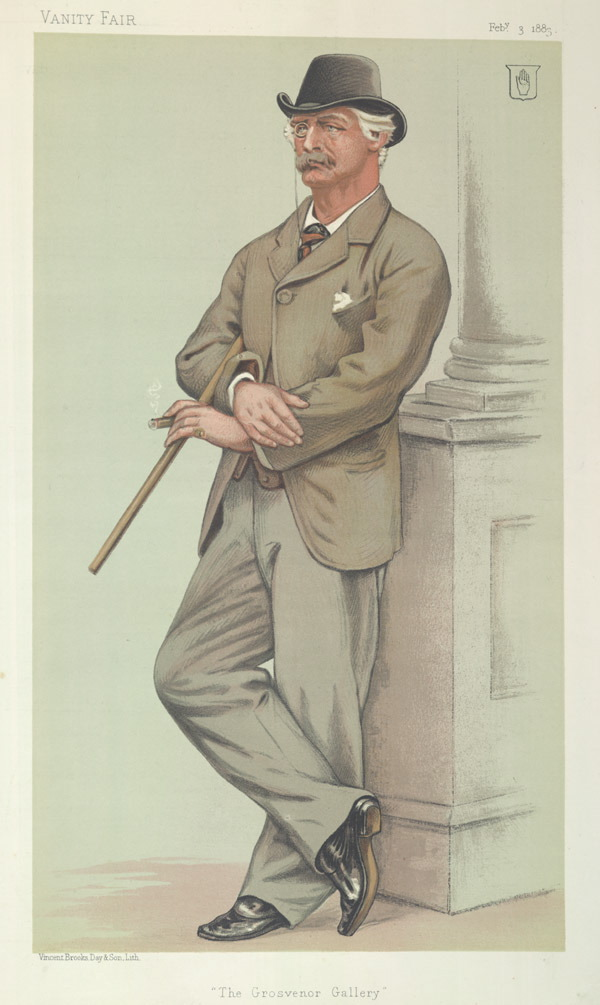
"The Grosvenor Gallery". Caricature by Joseph Middleton Jopling, published in Vanity Fair in 1883.

Sir Coutts Lindsay, 2nd Baronet (2 February 1824 – 7 May 1913 Kingston upon Thames), was a British artist and watercolourist.

== Life ==
Lindsay was the eldest son of Lieutenant-General Sir James Lindsay, son of the Hon. Robert Lindsay, second son of James Lindsay, 5th Earl of Balcarres. His mother was Anne, daughter of Sir Coutts Trotter, 1st Baronet, a principal partner in Coutt's Bank. Robert Loyd-Lindsay, 1st Baron Wantage, was his younger brother. In 1839 he succeeded by special remainder to his maternal grandfather's baronetcy. He then entered the army, commanding the 1st Regiment of the Italian Legion during the Crimean War before retiring from military life to devote himself to art. In the 1871 census, he describes himself as artist and dilettante. From 1862 to 1874 he exhibited many pictures, including various successful portraits. In 1879 he and his first wife, Lady Lindsay (of Balcarres), were both elected to membership of the Institute of Painters in Water Colours. His studio at 4-5 Cromwell Place was also used by Archibald Stuart-Wortley.

=== Grosvenor Gallery ===
He and his first wife founded the Grosvenor Gallery in 1877 as an alternative to the Royal Academy. It was devoted to exhibiting works by the Pre-Raphaelites (then held to be too stylistically advanced for the Royal Academy) and becoming the focus of the Aesthetic Movement from then until its closure in 1890. Its inaugural exhibition on 1 May 1877 included James Whistler's Nocturne in Black and Gold: The Falling Rocket, leading to the famous libel trial between Whistler and John Ruskin. Coutts was important to the careers of Coutts Lindsay's friends Whistler and George Frederic Watts in providing a sympathetic venue for the display of their work. In 1883, Lindsay pioneered the use of electric light in the gallery and by 1887, his operation was taken over by the London Electric Supply Corporation Limited.

However, the gallery declined after Lindsay separated from his first wife, and it closed in 1890. The premises were used by the Grosvenor Club before becoming the Aeolian Hall.

== Marriages ==
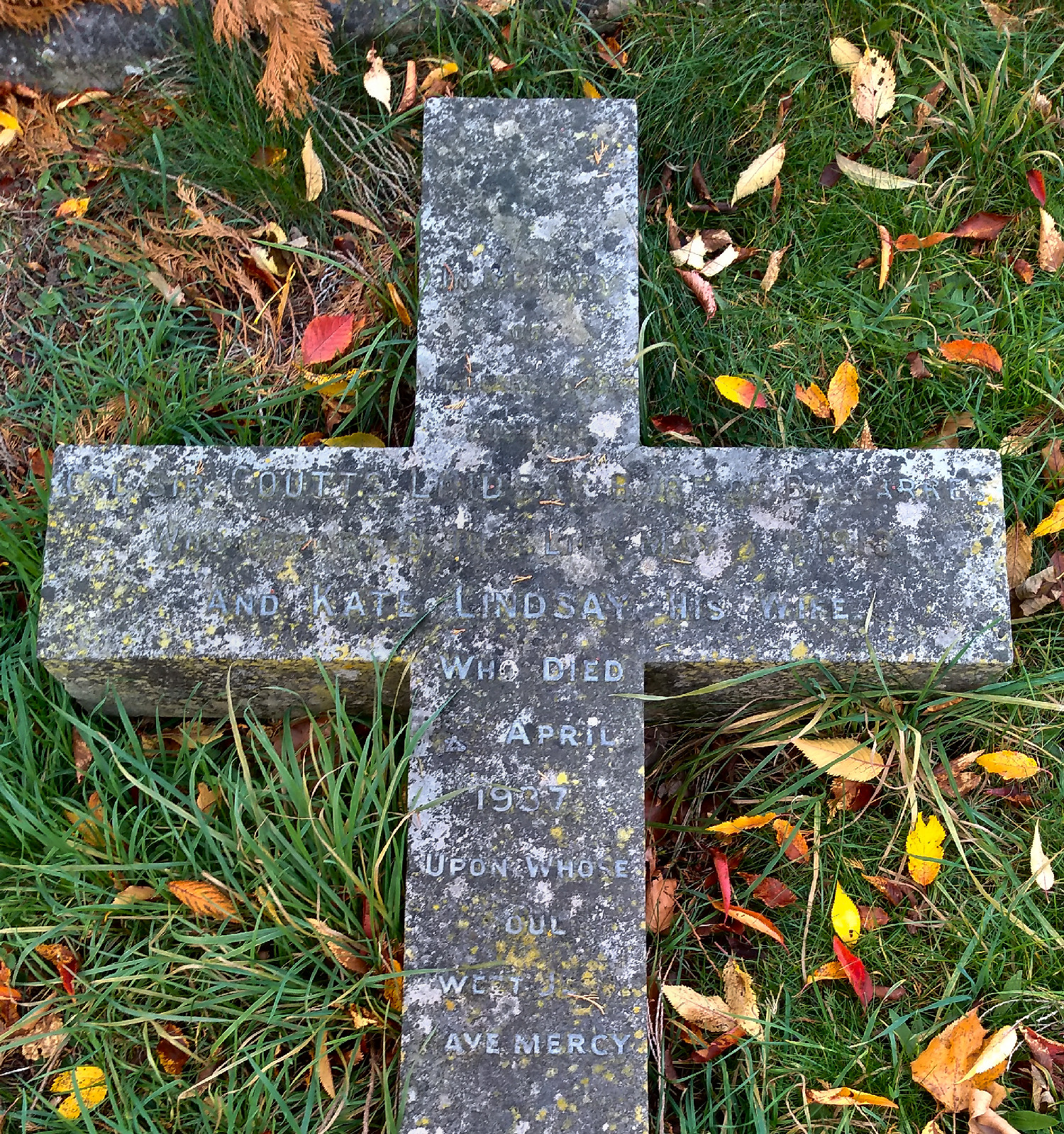
Memorial at St Andrew's Church, Ham

He first married in 1864 to the distinguished artist, novelist and poet Caroline Blanche Elizabeth Fitzroy (born 1844, died 10 August 1912, London), daughter of the Rt. Hon. Henry Fitzroy by his wife Hannah Mayer de Rothschild (daughter of Nathan Meyer Rothschild). Her portrait by Joseph Middleton Jopling is at the National Portrait Gallery, London. His daughter Harriet Euphemia Susan Lindsay married Thomas Selby Henrey, who was father of Robert Selby Henry, who was father of Bobby Henrey.

Lindsay's first marriage broke down after his founding of the Grosvenor Gallery, with Lady Lindsay taking control of it. In the 30 years before her death she then lived in London and Venice, gathering a circle of friends including Alma Tadema, GF Watts and Robert Browning and collecting a number of fine paintings (some of which she left to the National Gallery). She also published several volumes of poetry, including From a Venetian Balcony (1903) and Poems of Love and Death (1907).

They lived separately until her death in 1912; Lindsay's second marriage, in 1912, was to Kate Harriet Burfield (d. 1937). He is buried at St Andrew's Church, Ham.

== Works ==
=== Plays ===
- Alfred
- Edward the Black Prince
- Boadicea: A Tragedy, 1857

== Bibliography ==
- Walkley, Giles, Artists' houses in London 1764–1914, Aldershot, 1994

Casteras, Susan P., Colleen Denney, The Grosvenor Gallery: a Palace of Art in Victorian England, New Haven, 1996 The Annual Register 1913, p. 95

- Dictionary of National Biography, Oxford, on-line edition (accessed 2004).

Baronetage of the United Kingdom
Preceded by Coutts Trotter	Baronet (of West Ville); 1837–1913	Extinct
