= Erastus Dow Palmer =

American sculptor

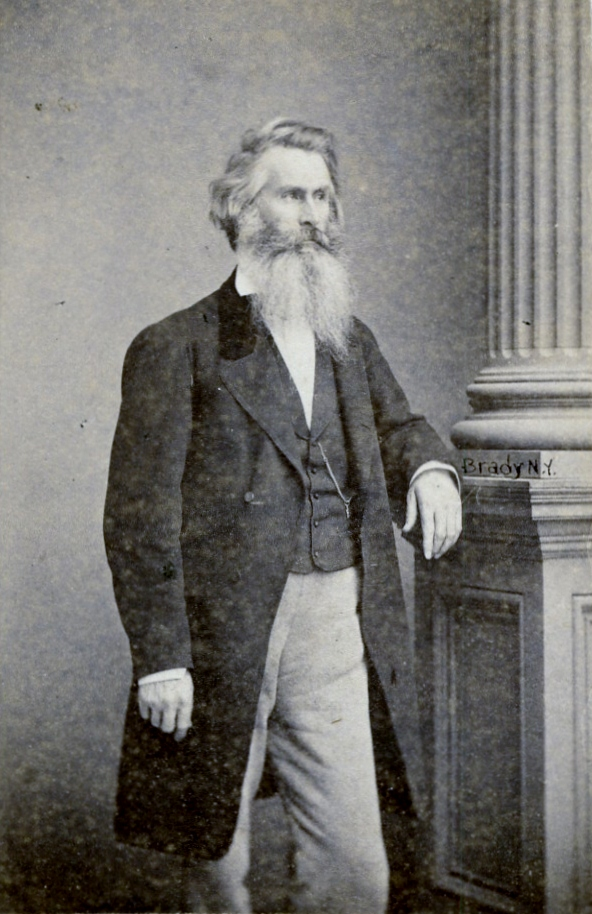
- Photograph of Palmer
- Born: Erastus Dow Palmer; April 2, 1817; Pompey, New York, U.S.
- Died: March 9, 1904 (aged 86); Albany, New York, U.S.
- Resting place: Albany Rural Cemetery
- Known for: Sculpture
- Children: Walter Launt Palmer

Erastus Dow Palmer (April 2, 1817 – March 9, 1904) was an American sculptor.

== Life ==
Palmer was born in Pompey, New York on April 2, 1817. He was the second of nine children. He showed early artistic promise, and pursued his father's trade of carpentry. Palmer married Matilda Alton in 1839 and had a son, but both mother and child died soon after; he remarried, to Mary Jean Seamans, in 1840, and settled in Utica, New York. In his leisure moments as a carpenter Palmer started by carving portraits in cameo, and earned the encouragement of Thomas R. Walker, a local art patron in Utica, who introduced him to prominent artists in New York City.

=== Sculpture ===
By 1849, Palmer had relocated to Albany with his family and had transitioned from cameo-cutting to large-scale sculpture. He worked in a primarily neoclassical style. Palmer mounted an exhibition of twelve of his sculptures, known as "the Palmer Marbles," at the National Academy of Design in 1856, aiding his rise to prominence. His major works include The White Captive (1858) in the permanent collection of the Metropolitan Museum of Art, New York, Peace in Bondage (1863), Angel at the Sepulchre (1865), in Albany, New York, a bronze statue of Chancellor Robert R. Livingston (1874), in Statuary Hall, Capitol, Washington, D.C., and many portrait busts. Palmer died at his home in Albany on March 9, 1904, and is buried in Albany Rural Cemetery.

Palmer admired the work of William Cullen Bryant, Asher B. Durand, and Frederic Edwin Church. Palmer was a friend of Church, and his work is represented in the collection at Olana, Church's home in Hudson, New York. The Albany Institute of History & Art also has significant holdings of Palmer's sculpture.

Palmer's son, Walter Launt Palmer (1854–1932), was also an artist best known for his paintings of winter scenes.

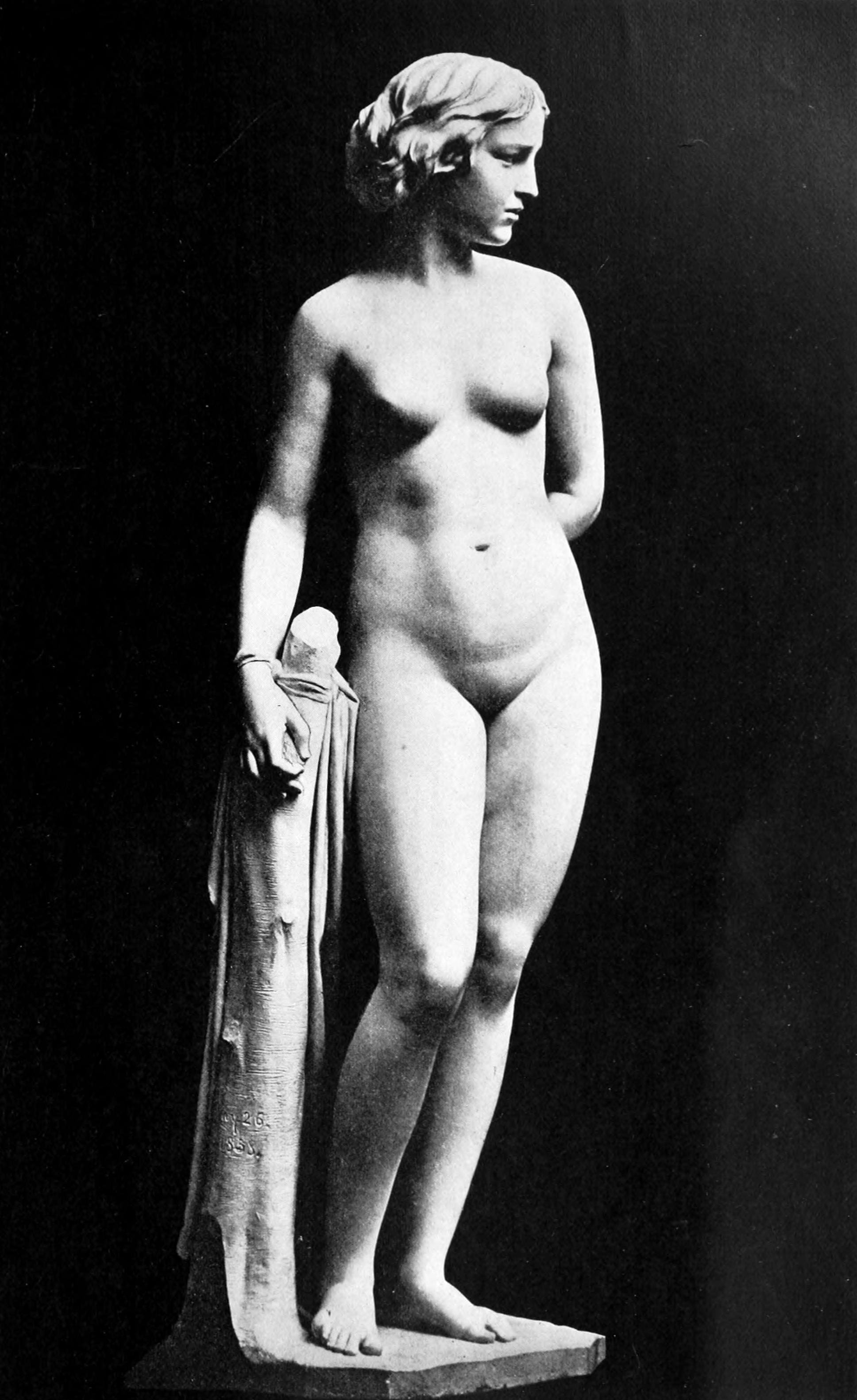
White Captive, Metropolitan Museum

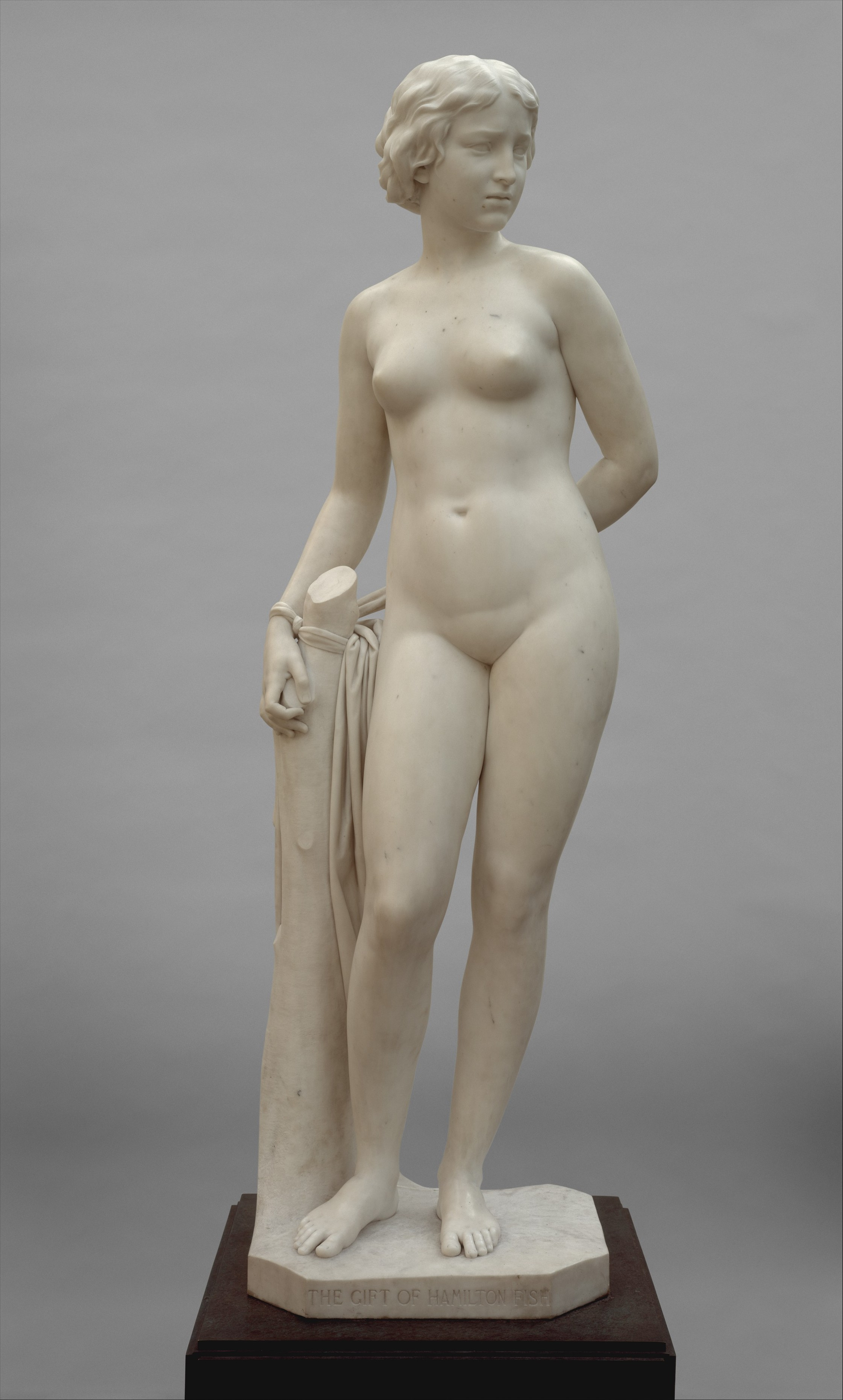
The White Captive by Erastus Dow Palmer, carved 1858-59, Metropolitan Museum of Art.

== See also ==
- Hiram Powers

== Sources ==
- Lessing, Lauren Keach (2006). Presiding Divinities: Ideal Sculpture in Nineteenth-Century American Domestic Interiors. Ph.D. dissertation: Indiana University.
