= Alexandros Christofis =

Greek painter

Alexandros Christofis Αλέξανδρος Χριστόφης
- Born: 1882; Piraeus, Greece
- Died: 1953; Piraeus, Greece
- Occupation: painter

Alexandros Christofis or Alexandros Hristofis (Greek: Αλέξανδρος Χριστόφης, 1882-1953) was a Greek painter.

He was born in Piraeus in 1882. He studied at the Athens School of Fine Arts and graduated with honors under the guidance of Nikiforos Lytras. He then went to Naples, Italy, where he continued his studies at the Institute of Fine Arts there. From his return to Greece until his death, he exhibited his paintings in solo and group exhibitions.

From 1925, he served as a professor at the Technical Teacher Training School. In 1937, he participated in the movement of academic painters alongside artists such as Apostolos Geralis and Spyridon Vikatos, and from 1945 until his death, he was a member of the artistic group of 17.

== Style ==
Christofis' style is considered academically rigorous but with a strong personal tone. His work mainly depicts scenes from everyday life, whether in the countryside or the city, as well as the lives of Greek sailors in the port of Piraeus. His paintings are housed in collections and institutions in Greece and Germany.
