= A Modern Cinderella (painting) =

Painting by Louise Jopling

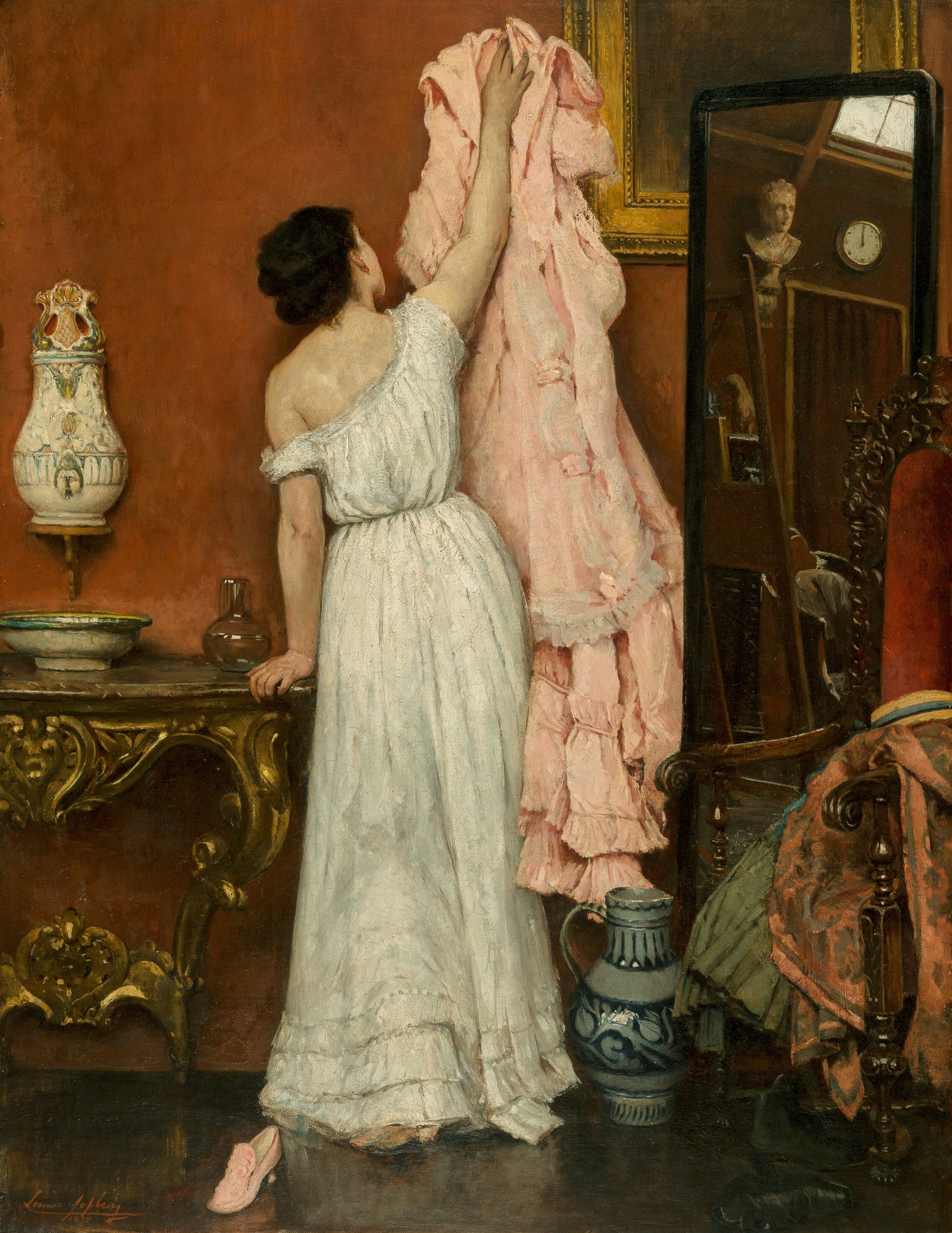
- Artist: Louise Jopling
- Year: 1875
- Type: Oil on canvas, genre painting
- Dimensions: 91.4 cm × 70.8 cm (36.0 in × 27.9 in)
- Location: Private collection

A Modern Cinderella is a 1875 oil painting by the British artist Louise Jopling. It depicts a artist's model changing out of the fine clothes she has worn while posing for a painting, suggesting that her situation is that of a modern Cinderella.

The painting was displayed at the Royal Academy Exhibition of 1875 held at Burlington House in London. It also featured at art section of | the Exposition Universelle of 1878 in Paris. The picture was displayed at the Now You See Us exhibition at the Tate Britain in 2024.

== Bibliography ==
- Barber, Tabitha (ed.) Now You See Us: Women Artists in Britain, 1520-1920. Tate Britain, 2024.
- Harris, Elree I. & Scott, Shirley R. A Gallery of Her Own: An Annotated Bibliography of Women in Victorian Painting. Taylor & Francis, 2013.
- Montfort, Patriciade. Louise Jopling: A Biographical and Cultural Study of the Modern Woman Artist in Victorian Britain. Taylor & Francis, 2017.
