= Nocturne in Black and Gold – The Falling Rocket =

1875 painting by James Abbott McNeil Whistler

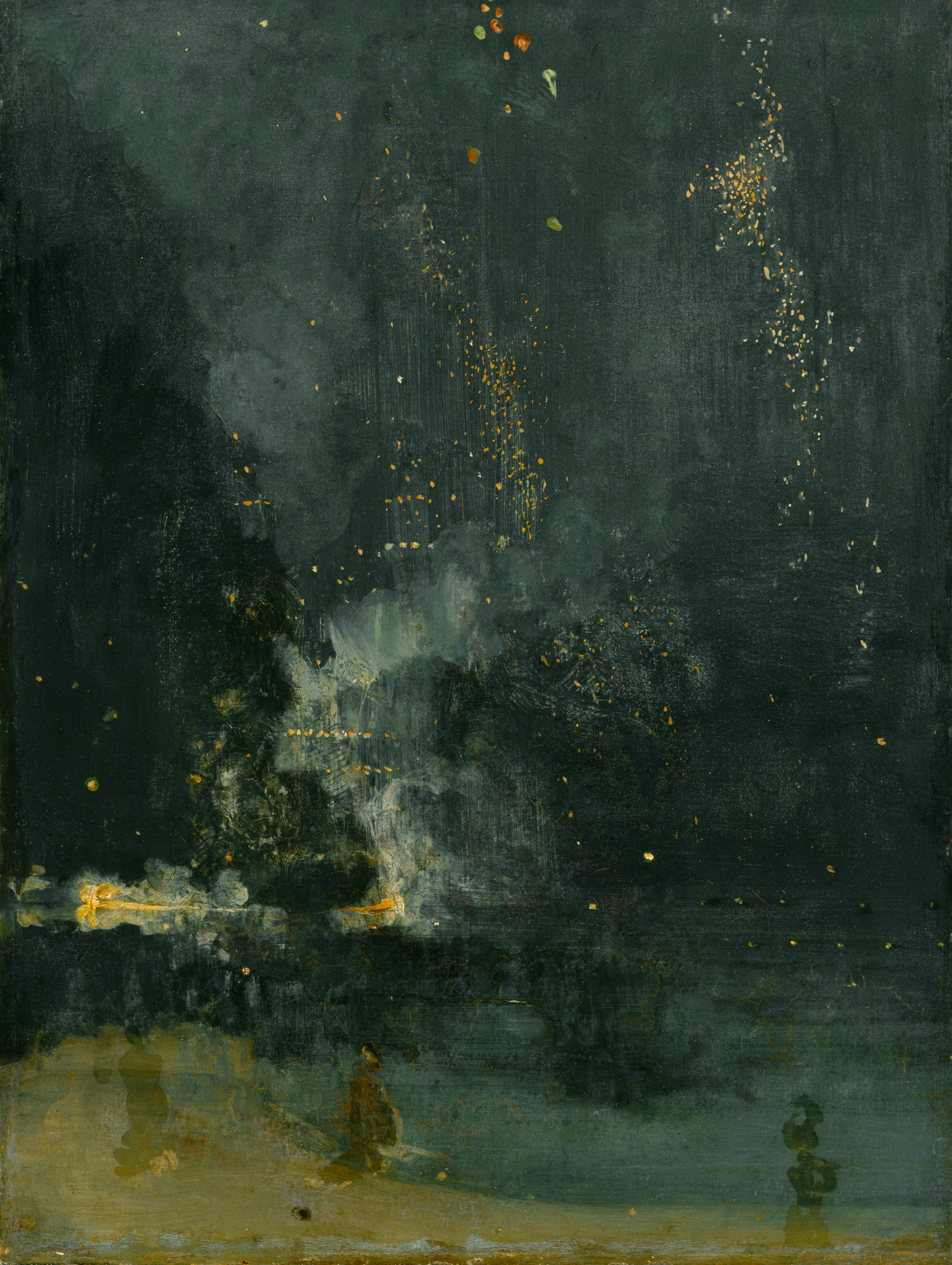
- Artist: James McNeill Whistler
- Year: 1875
- Medium: Oil on panel
- Dimensions: 60.3 cm × 46.7 cm (23.7 in × 18.4 in)
- Location: Detroit Institute of Arts, Detroit

Nocturne in Black and Gold – The Falling Rocket is a c. 1875 painting by James McNeill Whistler held in the Detroit Institute of Arts. The painting exemplified the art for art's sake movement – a concept formulated by Pierre Jules Théophile Gautier and Charles Baudelaire.

First shown at the Grosvenor Gallery Exhibition of 1877 in London, it is one of two works (the other being Nocturne in Black and Gold – The Firewheel) inspired by the Cremorne Gardens, a celebrated pleasure resort in London. One of his many works from his series of Nocturnes, it is the last of the London Nocturnes and is now widely acknowledged to be the high point of Whistler's middle period. Whistler's depiction of the industrial city park in The Falling Rocket includes a fireworks display in the foggy night sky. Nocturne in Black and Gold – The Falling Rocket is most famously known as the painting behind the lawsuit brought by Whistler against the art critic John Ruskin.

The painting was featured in the 1980 BBC Two series 100 Great Paintings.

== Composition ==
Nocturne in Black and Gold – The Falling Rocket is fundamentally composed of bleak tones, with three main colors: blue, green, and yellow. Restricted in its use of colors, the piece develops a muted yet harmonious composition.The billowing smoke gives the viewer a clear distinction between the water and the sky, where the separation blurs into a cohesive and somber space. It is this large avalanche of fog that represents the rocket of the title. Dabs of yellow enliven the artwork as exploding fireworks in the misty air. The figures watching are almost transparent, their shapes general and simplistic.

To the right, the artist signed his name in a manner that was clearly influenced by Japanese prints, with thick, straight brushstrokes that appear to imitate Japanese characters. Influenced by Japanese artists like Utagawa Hiroshige, Whistler spent years perfecting his splatter technique. Eventually he possessed the ability to make an object or person with what appeared to be nothing more than a single flick of paint. Although Whistler's critics denounced his technique as reckless or lacking artistic merit, it is notable that Whistler spent much of his time with meticulous details, often going so far as to view his work through mirrors to ensure that no deficiencies were overlooked.

== Concept and theory ==
The Falling Rocket retains a certain degree of color-laden luminosity that provokes spatial ambiguity set against a structure of line and form. Nocturnes were a series of paintings which, through painterly style, were evocative of differing night time scenes. The artist insisted that they were not pictures but rather scenes or moments. Working against contemporary inclinations for narrative (indicative of the heavy consumption of literature), Whistler can be seen arguing for painting's essential difference from literature within this work, as color and tone trounce hints of narrative or moral allusion. Whistler's focus was on coloristic effects as a means of creating a particular sensation. More than that, a Nocturne is concerned with its depiction of space, seeking a particular sense of void that seems to arise only in the night time.

As part of the Art for Art's Sake movement, the artwork seeks to provide complex emotions that go beyond the technicalities of the imagery. Whistler believed that certain experiences were often best expressed by nuance and implication. These compositions were not designed to avoid the truth of a scene, but instead served as a means of reaching deeper, more hidden truths. His artistic endeavours no longer concerned themselves with physical accuracy, seeking only to capture the essence of an intangible, personal and intimate moment. Whistler has been quoted as saying "If the man who paints only the tree, or flower, or other surface he sees before him were an artist, the king of artists would be the photographer. It is for the artist to do something beyond this." In essence, The Falling Rocket is the synthesis of a fireworks scene in London, and so by no means does it aim to look like it. Like his other Nocturnes, the painting is meant to be seen as an arrangement, set to invoke particular sensations for the audience.

== Controversy ==
Affronted by The Falling Rocket, John Ruskin accused Whistler of "flinging a pot of paint in the public's face" in the Fors Clavigera. As a leading art critic of the Victorian era, Ruskin's harsh critique of The Falling Rocket caused an uproar among owners of other Whistler works. Rapidly, it became shameful to have a Whistler piece, pushing the artist into greater financial difficulties.

With his pride, finances, and the significance of his Nocturne at stake, Whistler sued Ruskin for libel in defense. In court, he asked the jury to not view it as a traditional painting, but instead as an artistic arrangement. In his explanation, he insisted that the painting was a representation of the fireworks from the Cremorne Gardens. During the trial, Sir John Holker asked, "Not a view of the Cremorne?" to which Whistler was quoted as saying, "If it were a view of Cremorne, it would certainly bring about nothing but disappointment on the part of the beholders." His case was hurt when The Falling Rocket was accidentally presented to trial upside down. His explanation of the composition proved fruitless before the judge. The Ruskin vs. Whistler trial, which took place on November 25 and 26, 1878, was disastrous for Whistler, who won only a farthing. After all the court costs, he had no choice but to declare bankruptcy. Whistler was forced to pawn, sell, and mortgage everything he could get his hands on. Whistler included a transcript of the case in his 1890 book The Gentle Art of Making Enemies.

John Ruskin was not aware of the effort and theory that had gone into Nocturne in Black and Gold when he accused The Falling Rocket of being a public insult. Ruskin had berated Whistler's paintings long before the event leading up to the trial. Four years earlier, he had denounced Whistler's art as "absolute rubbish." It is speculated that Ruskin was envious of Whistler's close relationship with Charles Augustus Howell, who often aided Whistler financially – especially after the court case. It is also said that the artist's lack of homage offended Ruskin. Henry James also spoke out against Ruskin, remarking that Ruskin had begun to overstep his bounds as an art critic, becoming tyrannical in his diction – so much so that to see him brought to court over his offensive words was perceived as a delight. It has been suggested John Ruskin suffered from CADASIL syndrome and the visual disturbances this condition caused him might have been a factor in his irritation at this particular painting.

== See also ==
- List of paintings by James McNeill Whistler

== Bibliography ==
- Hawkins, Arthur (2023). Art on Trial: Whistler, Ruskin, and the Fall of a Rocket. Amazon Digital Services LLC. 40 pages.
- Murphy, Paul Thomas (2023). Falling Rocket: James Whistler, John Ruskin, and the Battle for Modern Art. New York: Pegasus Books, Ltd. ISBN 978-1-63936-491-6.
- Prideaux, Tom (1970). The World of Whistler, 1834-1903. New York: Time-Life Books.
