= Hush! (painting) =

Painting by James Tissot

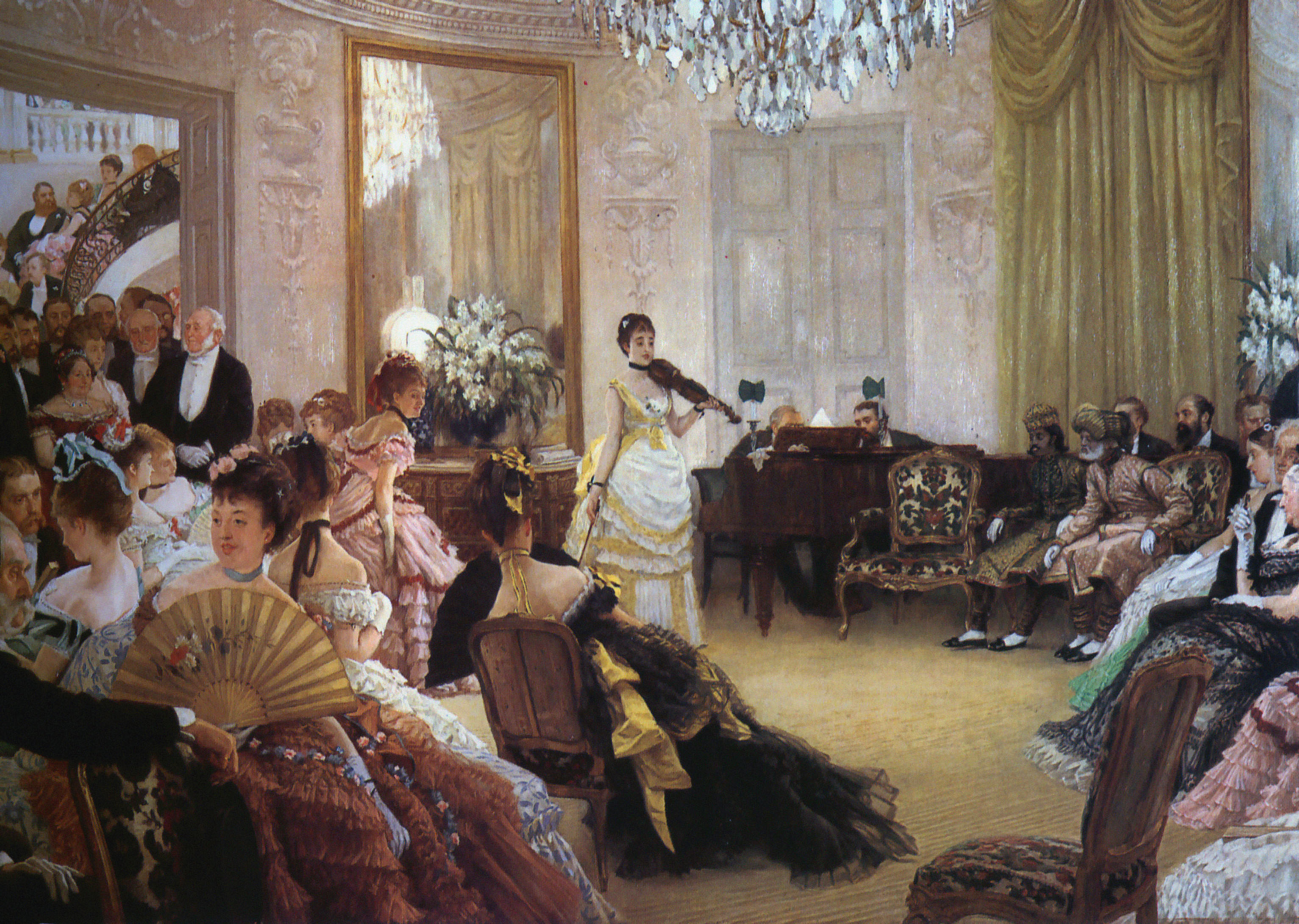
- Artist: James Tissot
- Year: 1875
- Type: Oil on canvas, genre painting
- Dimensions: 73.7 cm × 112.2 cm (29.0 in × 44.2 in)
- Location: Manchester Art Gallery, Manchester

Hush! is an oil painting on canvas by the French artist James Tissot, from 1875.

== History and description ==
A genre painting it depicts a musical evening held at a salon in the fashionable London suburb of Kensington. Tissot's painting draws on the polite social conventions of the Victorian era as those in a drawing room politely listening as young woman is about to play the violin accompanied by a piano. Amongst the figures gathered in the doorway are Tissot's fellow artists Giuseppe De Nittis and Ferdinand Heilbuth.

It was one of Tissot's greatest successes and was bought for 1,200 guineas by the art dealers Agnews. The painting was displayed at the Royal Academy Exhibition of 1875 at Burlington House in London. It is now in the collection of Manchester Art Gallery having been purchased in 1933.

== Bibliography ==
- Ash, Russell. James Tissot. Pavilion, 1992.
- Marshall, Nancy Rose & Warner, Malcolm. James Tissot: Victorian Life, Modern Love. Yale University Press, 1999.
