= Grosvenor Gallery =

Art gallery in London, England (1877–1890)

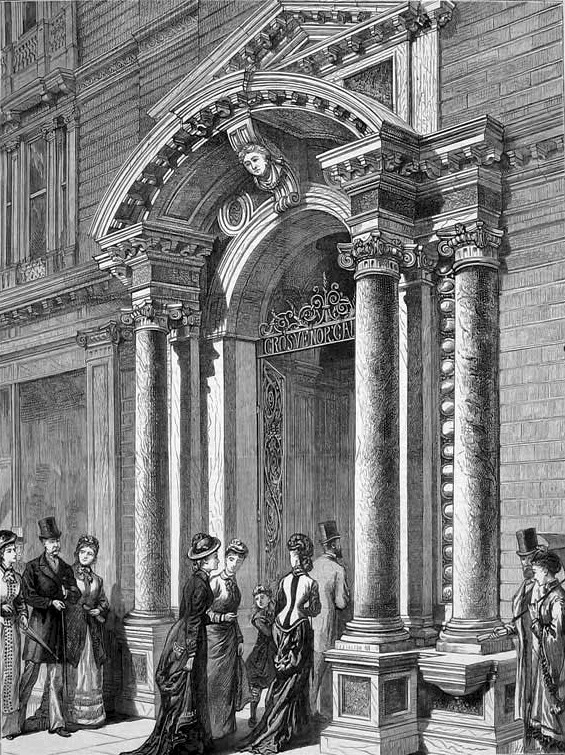
Main entrance to the Grosvenor Gallery – wood-engraving published in The Graphic, 19 May 1877

The Grosvenor Gallery was an art gallery in London founded in 1877 by Sir Coutts Lindsay and his wife Blanche. Its first directors were J. Comyns Carr and Charles Hallé. The gallery proved crucial to the aesthetic movement because it provided a home for those artists whose approaches were not welcomed by the more classical and conservative Royal Academy, such as Edward Burne-Jones and Walter Crane.

== History ==
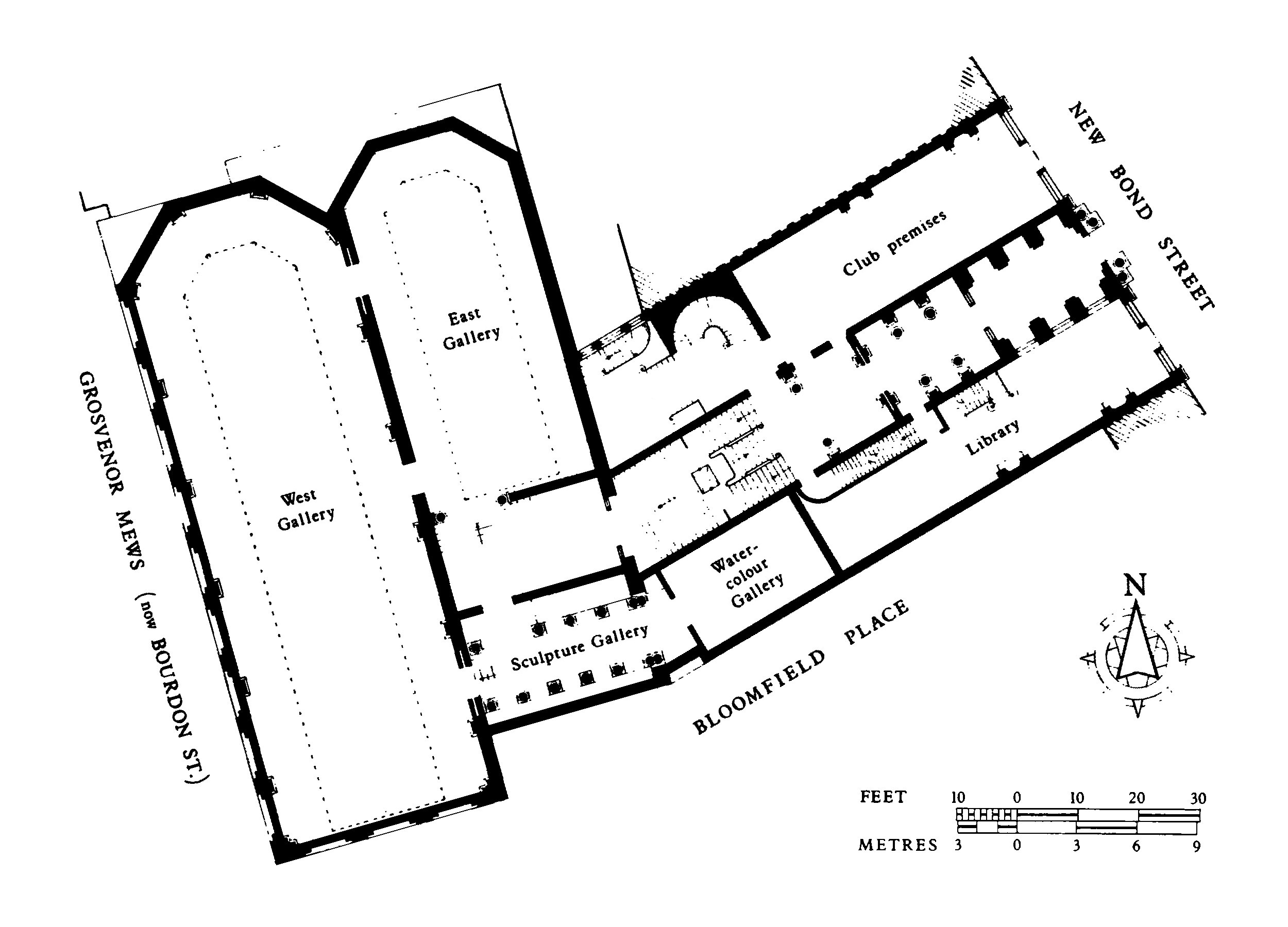
Grosvenor Gallery floor plan, 1899

The gallery was founded in Bond Street, London, in 1877 by Sir Coutts Lindsay and his wife Blanche. They engaged J. Comyns Carr and Charles Hallé as co-directors. Lindsay and his wife were well-born and well-connected, and both were amateur artists. Blanche was born a Rothschild, and it was her money which made the whole enterprise possible.

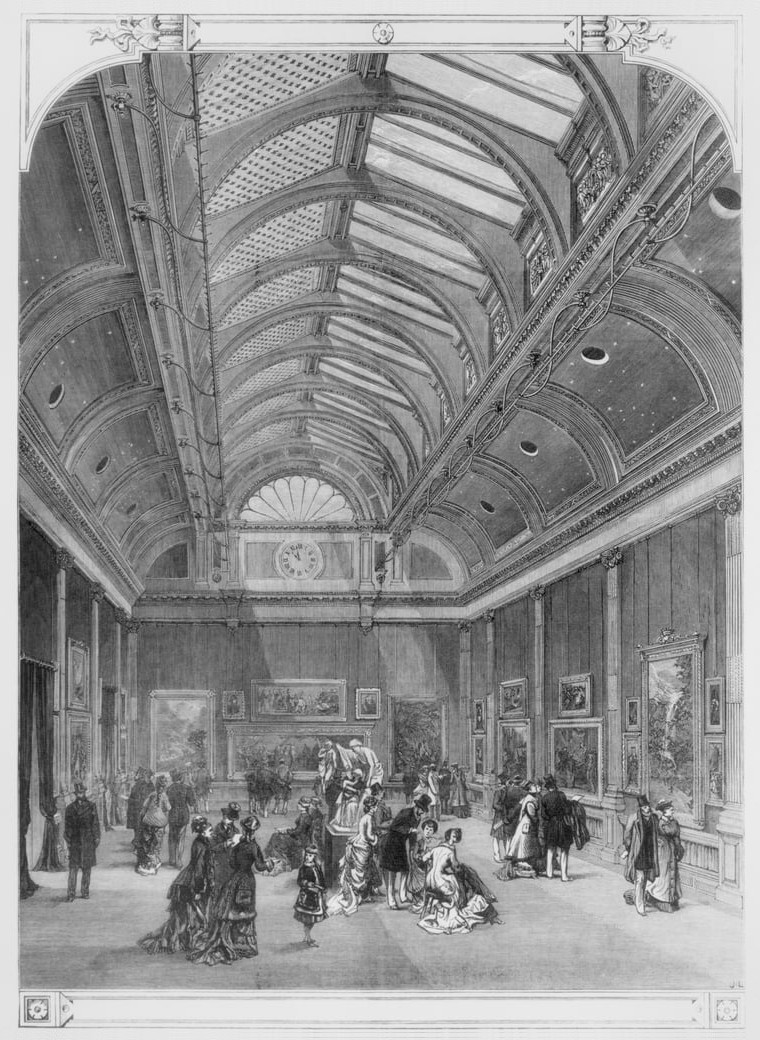
West Gallery of the Grosvenor – wood-engraving published in The Illustrated London News, 5 May 1877

The Grosvenor displayed work by artists from outside the British mainstream, including Edward Burne-Jones, Walter Crane and other members of the Pre-Raphaelite Brotherhood. But it also featured work by others that were widely shown elsewhere, including the Royal Academy, such as Lawrence Alma-Tadema, Edward John Poynter and James Tissot. For the inaugural Grosvenor Gallery Exhibition of 1877 John Ruskin visited the gallery to see work by Burne-Jones. An exhibition of paintings by James McNeill Whistler was also on display. Ruskin's savage review of Whistler's work led to a famous libel case, brought by the artist against the critic. Whistler won a farthing in damages. The case made the gallery famous as the home of the aesthetic movement, as satirised in Gilbert and Sullivan's Patience, which includes the line, "greenery-yallery, Grosvenor Gallery". The enterprising art critic Henry Blackburn issued illustrated guides to the annual exhibitions under the title Grosvenor Notes (1877‍–‍1882).

In 1888, after a disagreement with Lindsay, Comyns Carr and Hallé resigned from the gallery to found the rival New Gallery, capturing Burne-Jones and many of the Grosvenor Gallery's other artists. The break-up of his marriage, financial constraints and personal conflicts forced Lindsay out of the gallery, which was taken over by his estranged wife.

== Revivals ==
After its closure in 1890, the Grosvenor Gallery name was twice revived by unrelated ventures.

In October 1912, P. & D. Colnaghi & Co. and Knoedler opened a new Grosvenor Gallery at 51a New Bond Street, appointing the American-born artist and critic Francis Howard, who worked for Knoedler, as the managing director. With six rooms, the Gallery was planned to be one of the largest and finest in London. There was an appeal to raise funds to purchase the lease from the Colnaghis, but in January 1920 the Daily Mirror announced that the gallery was to be closed due to problems with funding. The gallery was reopened in February 1921 under the sole proprietorship of the Colnaghis, with an exhibition of living artists. However, it finally closed in 1924, with the Colnaghis stating that the problem was not so much finance, even though the gallery did not pay its way, but the difficulty of finding 1,000 new works of an adequate quality every year.

In October 1960, the American art collector, dealer, and author Eric Estorick opened a new Grosvenor Gallery at 15 Davies Street with a display of modern sculpture. The gallery was still operating in 2026.

== Generating station ==
Upon returning from the Paris Exhibition of 1882, the Earl of Crawford recommended that Lindsay install electric lighting in the gallery. In 1883, two Marshall engines, each belted to a Siemens alternator, were installed in a yard behind the gallery. The installation was a success, and neighbours began requesting a supply. Lindsay, Crawford and Lord Wantage then set up the Sir Coutts Lindsay Co. Ltd., and in 1885 constructed the Grosvenor Power Station. This was constructed underneath the gallery and had a capacity of 1,000 kilowatts. The station supplied an area reaching as far north as Regent's Park, the River Thames to the south, Knightsbridge to the west and the High Court of Justice to the east, at 2,250 volts using overhead cable distribution. However the system caused a lot of trouble, so much so that Sebastian Ziani de Ferranti gave advice as to how to resolve it in 1885; by January 1886 Ferranti was Chief Engineer and within a few months reworked the system to include a Hick, Hargreaves Corliss engine and two alternators to his own design as replacements for the Siemens equipment. A fire broke out on 15 November 1890, causing an entire cessation of the lighting for a period of three months. The plant was subsequently relocated to Deptford, and the station was made a substation supplied from Deptford Power Station.

== See also ==
- Grosvenor Gallery Library

== Sources and further reading ==
- Denney, Colleen (2000). At the Temple of Art: the Grosvenor Gallery, 1877–1890. Madison, NJ: Fairleigh Dickinson University Press. ISBN 0-8386-3850-3.
- Hannah, Leslie (1979). Electricity Before Nationalisation, A Study in the Development of the Electricity Supply Industry in Britain to 1948. London & Basingstoke: Macmillan Publishers for the Electricity Council. ISBN 0-8018-2145-2.
- Lambourne, Lionel (1996). The Aesthetic Movement. London: Phaidon Press. ISBN 0-7148-3000-3.
- Snodin, Michael; Styles, John (2001). Design & The Decorative Arts, Britain 1500–1900. London: V&A Publications. ISBN 1-85177-338-X.
