= Royal Academy Exhibition of 1877 =

1877 art exhibition in London

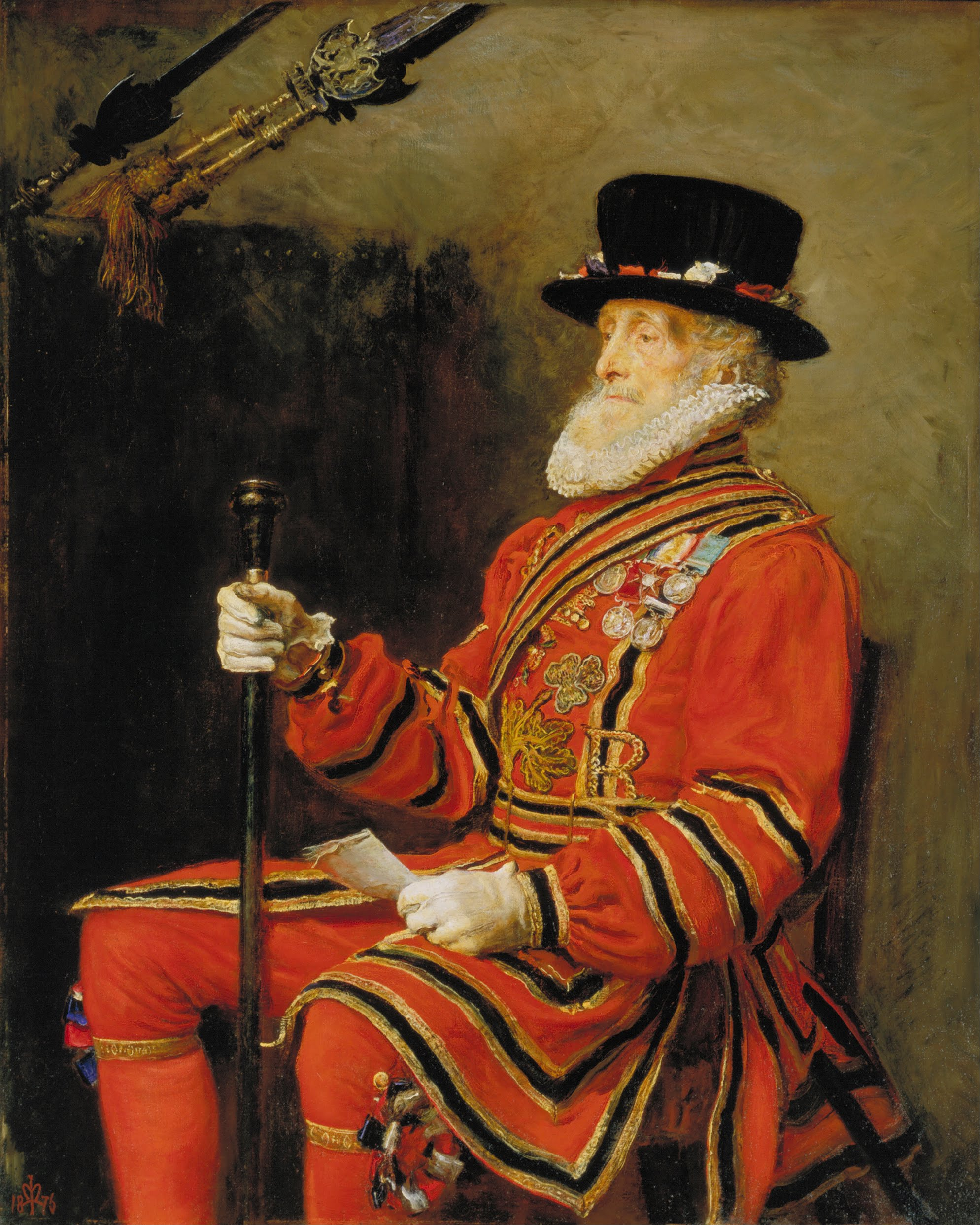
The Yeoman of the Guard by John Everett Millais

The Royal Academy Exhibition of 1877 was the hundred and ninth annual Summer Exhibition staged by the British Royal Academy of Arts. It was held at Burlington House in London from 7 May to 6 August and attracting over 300,000 visitors. It featured submissions from many of the leading artists and architects of the Victorian era, but came at a time when the Academy was facing a challenge from new art exhibitions such as the rival Grosvenor Gallery in Bond Street.

Edwin Long's Orientalist painting An Egyptian Feast was one of the most discussed and popular works on display. Another work that attracted particular attention was the sculpture An Athlete Wrestling with a Python by Frederic Leighton, better known as a painter who would succeed Francis Grant as President of the Royal Academy the following year.

John Everett Millais displayed The Yeoman of the Guard featuring a portrait of a veteran Beefeater. The Dutch artist Lawrence Alma-Tadema exhibited The Seasons, a series of four paintings depicting the seasons. George Dunlop Leslie showed The Lass of Richmond Hill, which he had recently presented as his diploma work on election to the Royal Academy. Edward Matthew Ward displayed the history paintings William III at Windsor and The Last Interview Between Napoleon and Queen Louisa of Prussia at Tilsit, a scene from the Napoleonic Wars. The French artist Henri Félix Emmanuel Philippoteaux displayed The Battle of Alma, inspired by the Crimean War.

== Gallery ==
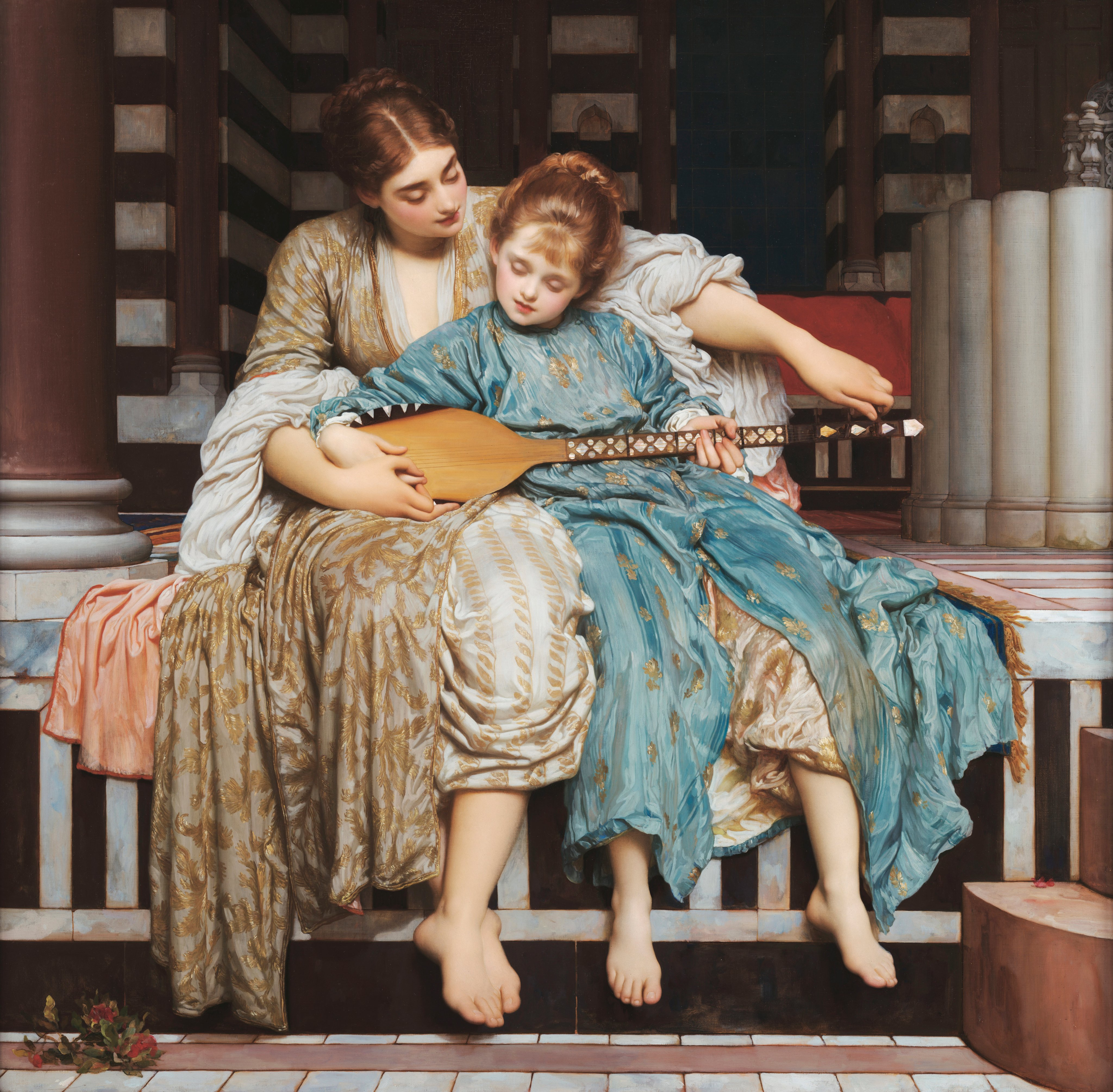
The Music Lesson by Frederic Leighton

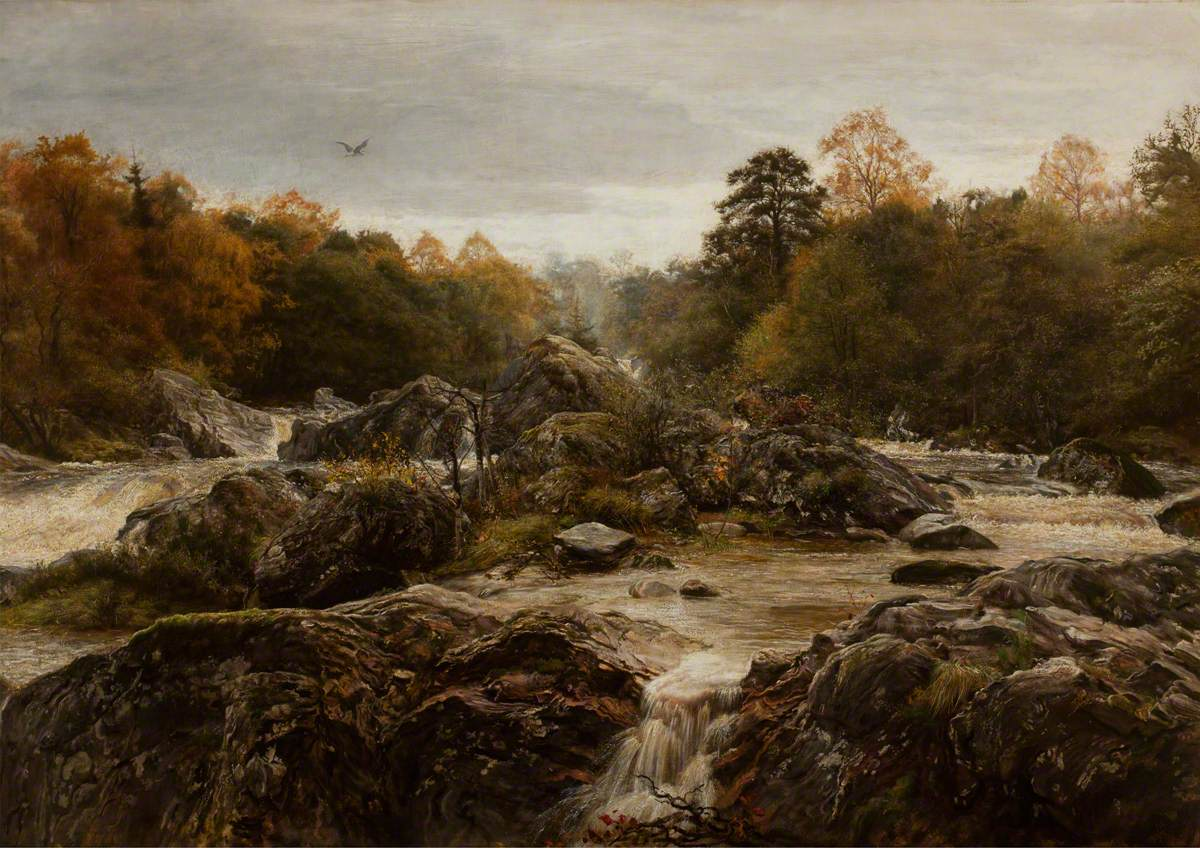
The Sound of Many Waters by John Everett Millais

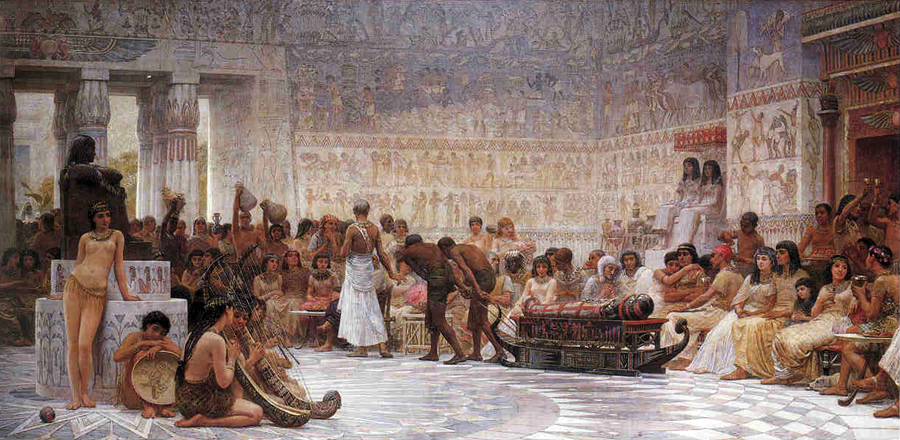
An Egyptian Feast by Edwin Long

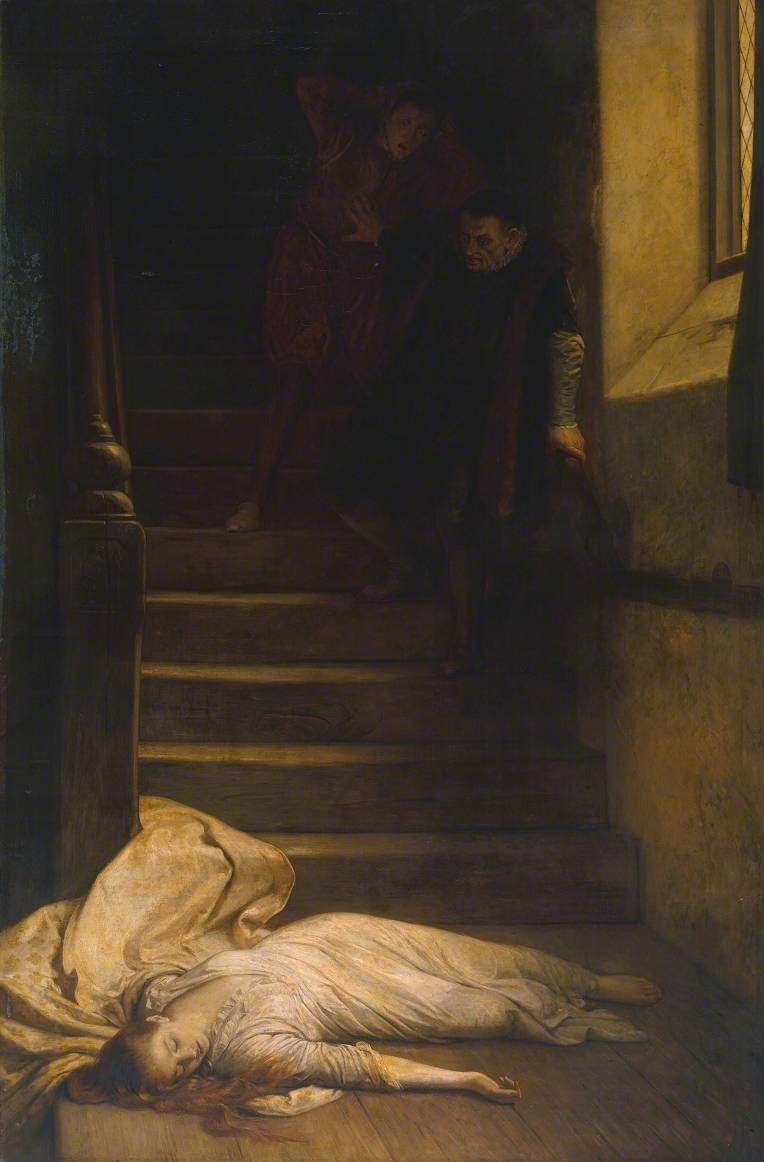
Amy Robsart by William Frederick Yeames

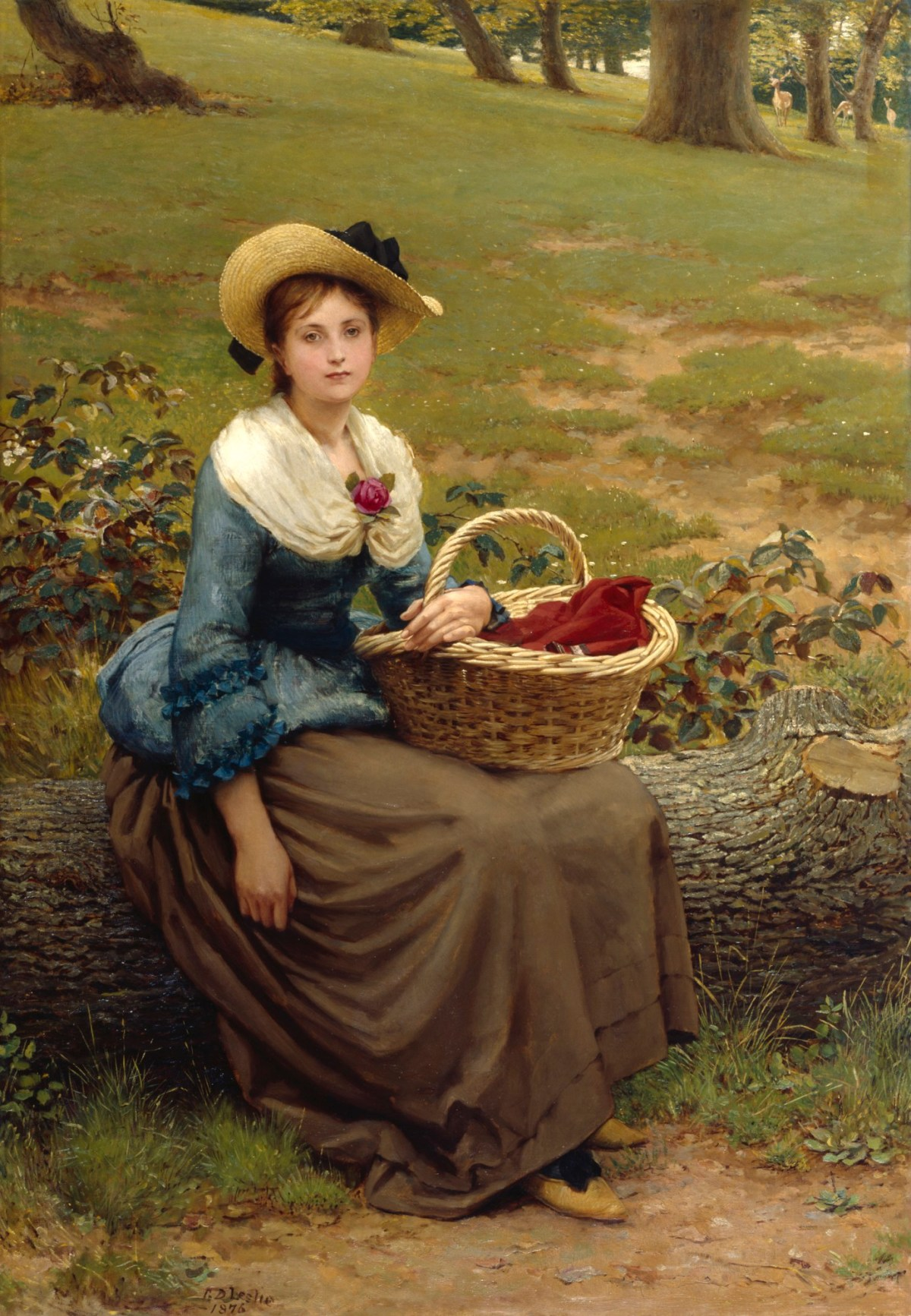
The Lass of Richmond Hill by George Dunlop Leslie

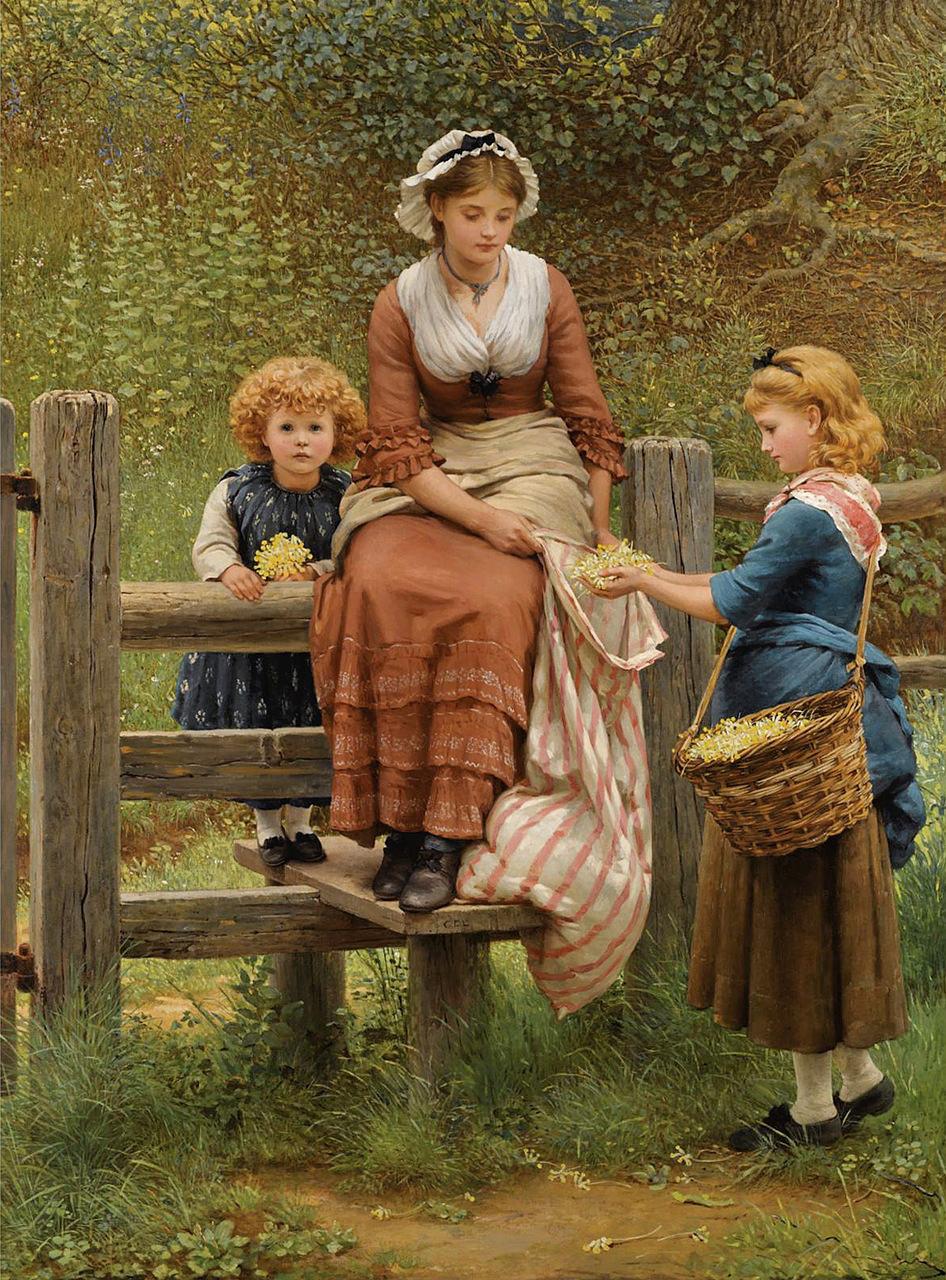
Cowslips by George Dunlop Leslie

The Hop Picker by Charles Edward Perugini

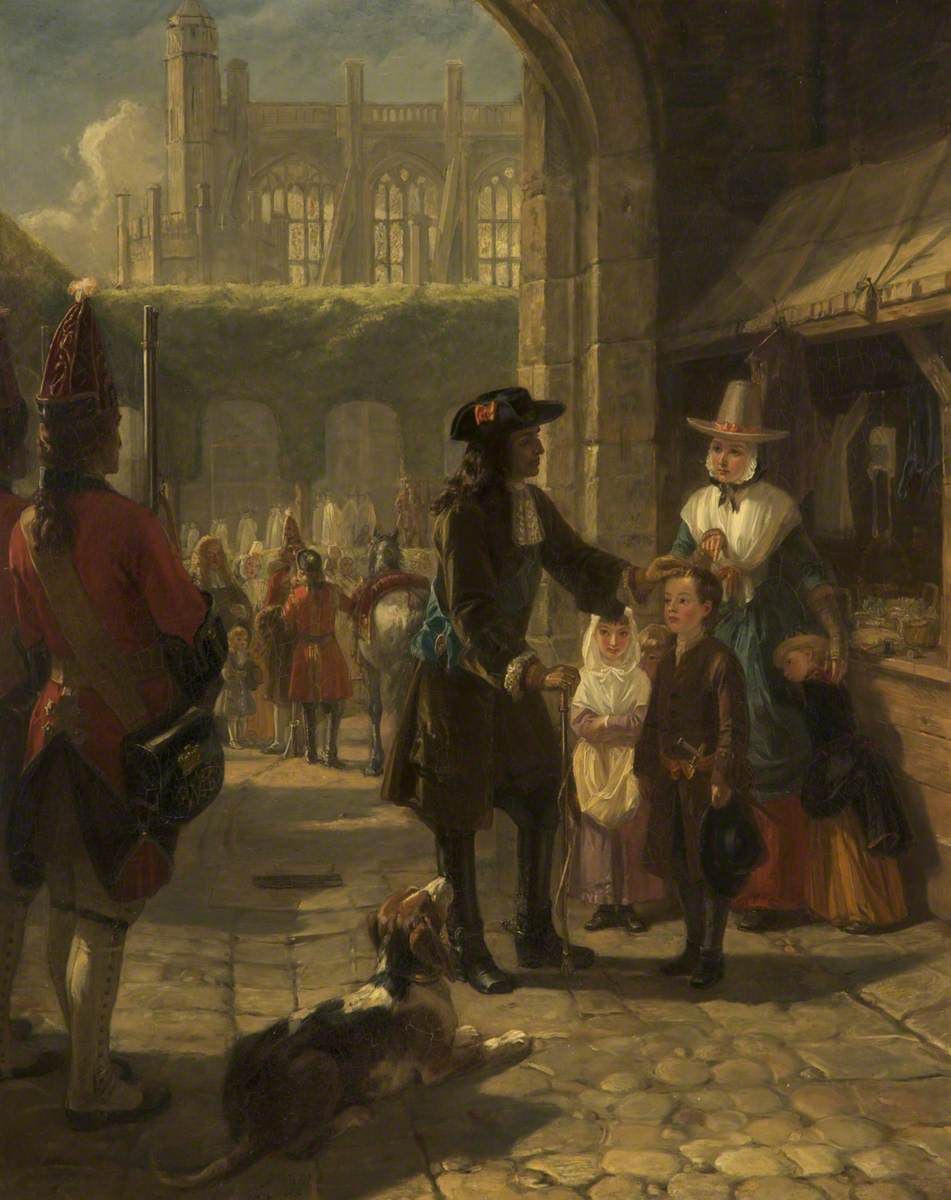
William III at Windsor by Edward Matthew Ward

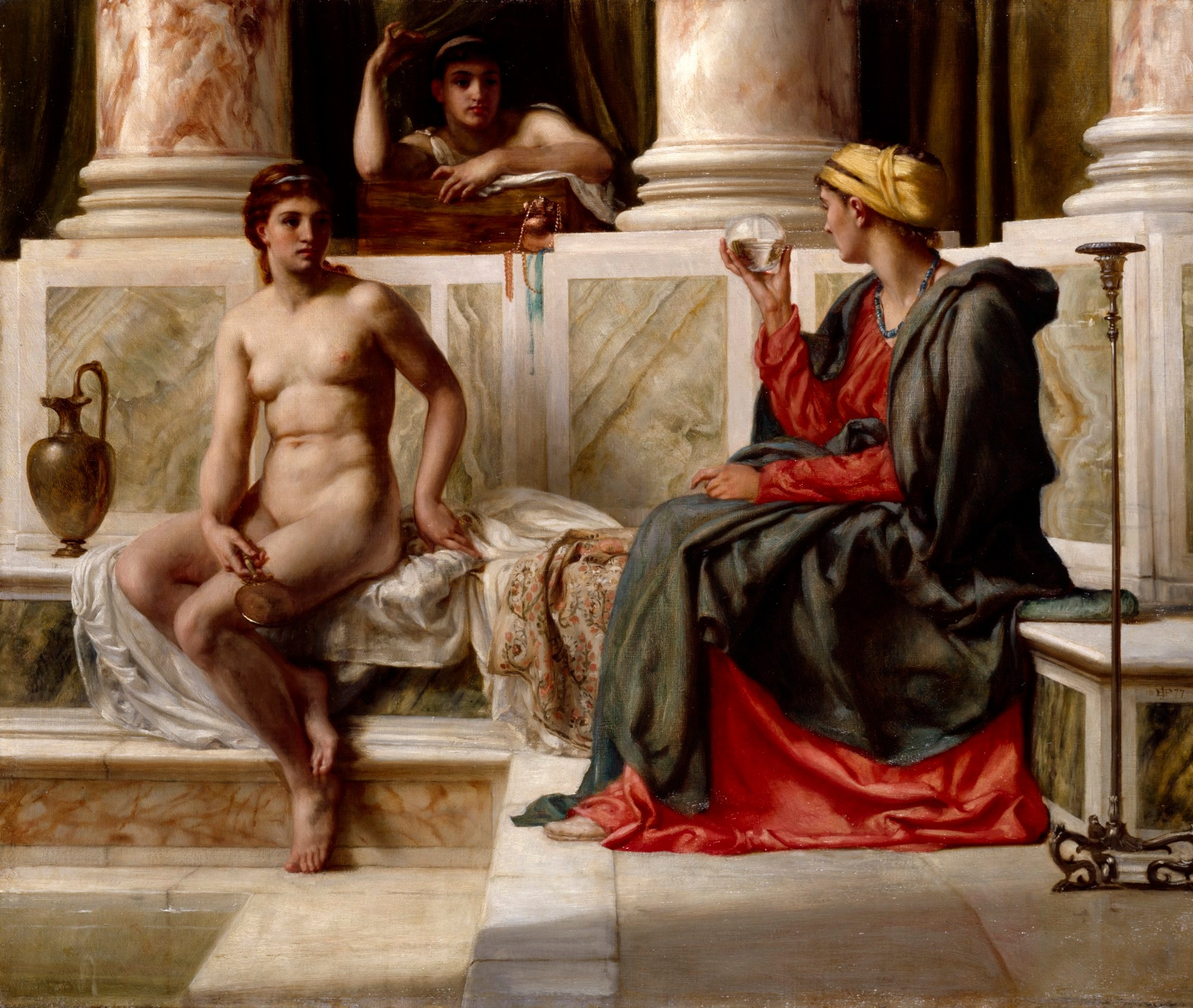
The Fortune Teller by Edward Poynter

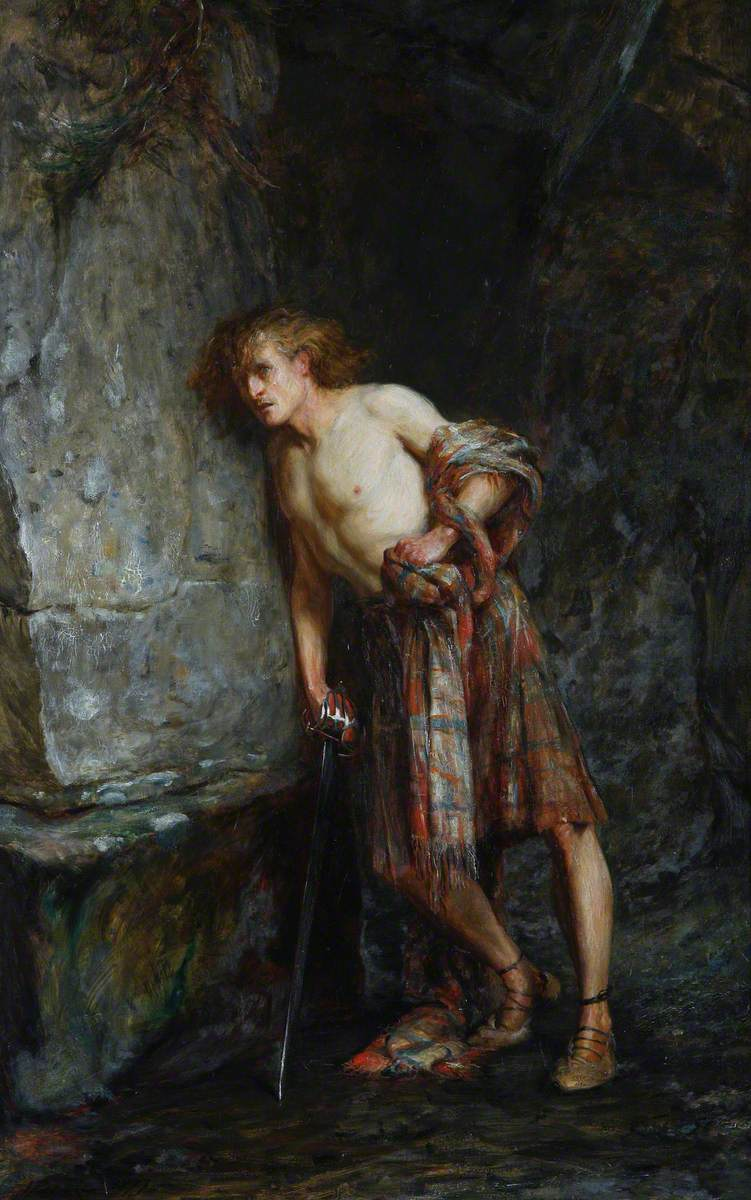
Hunted Down by John Pettie

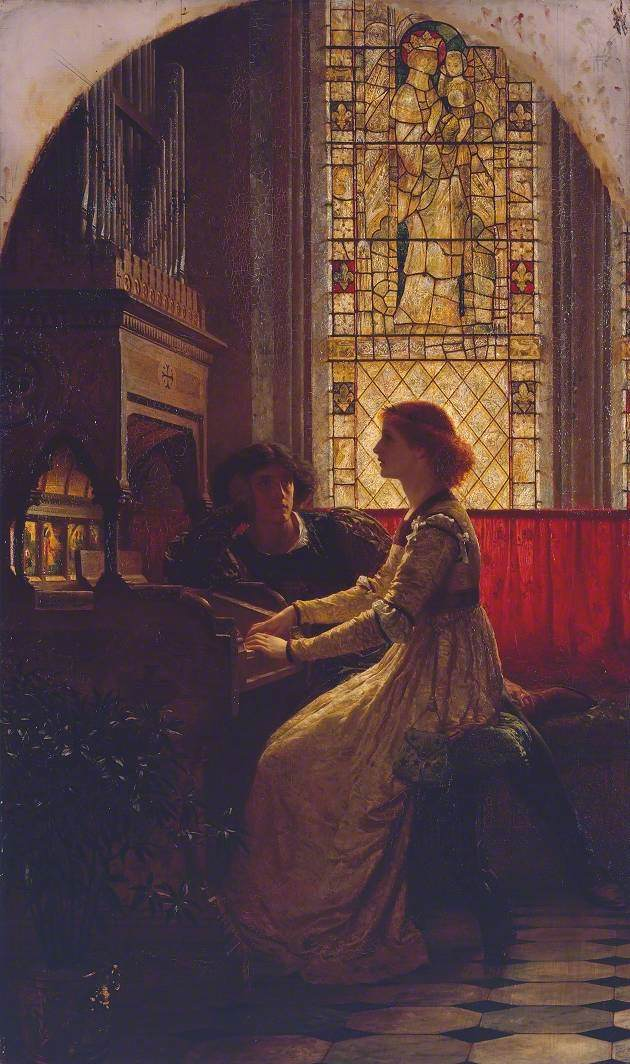
Harmony by Frank Bernard Dicksee

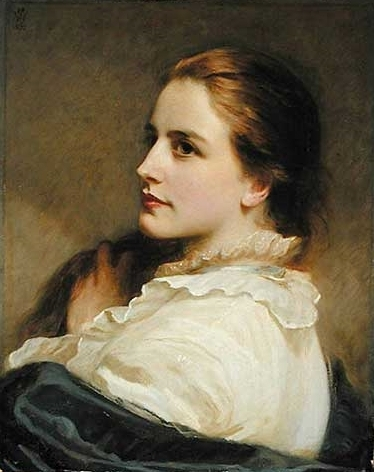
Alice by Henry Tanworth Wells

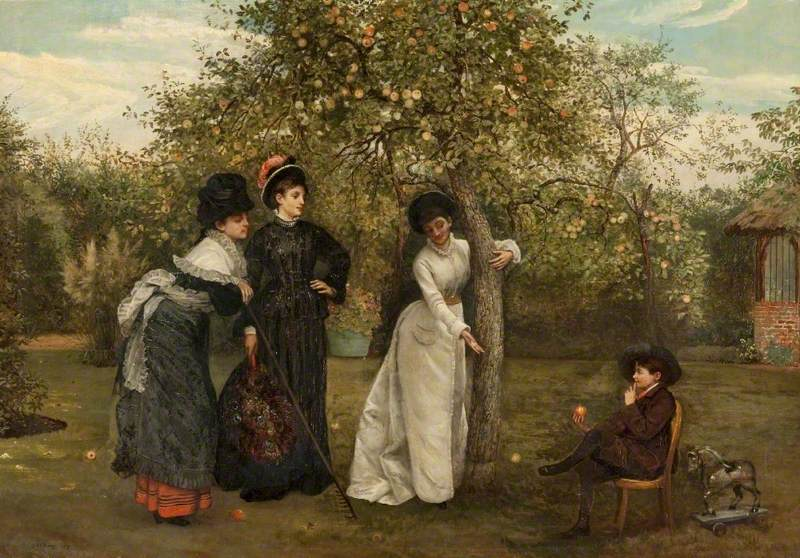
The Judgment of Paris by George Adolphus Storey

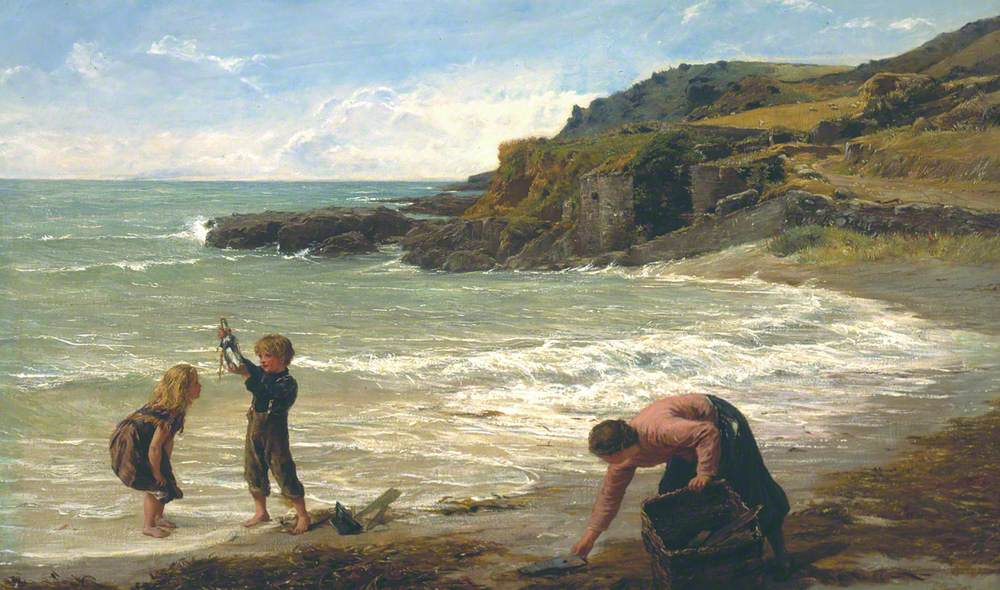
Word From the Missing by James Clarke Hook

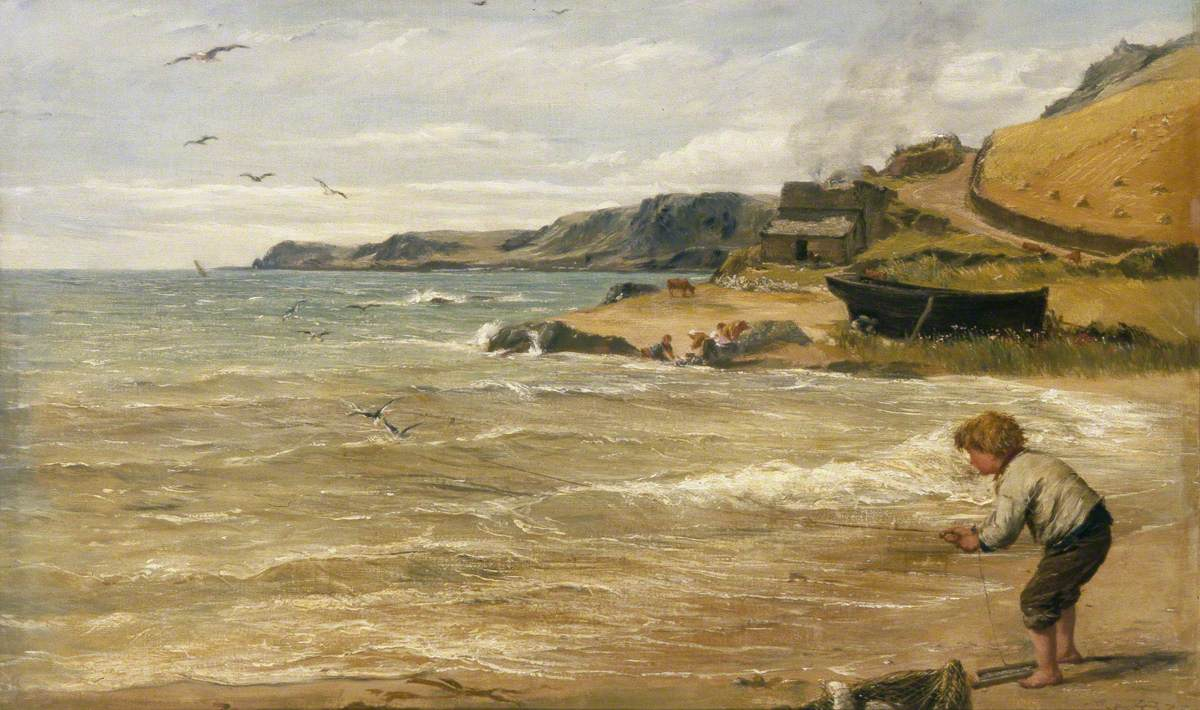
The Gull Catcher by James Clarke Hook

The Home of the Red Deer by Richard Ansdell

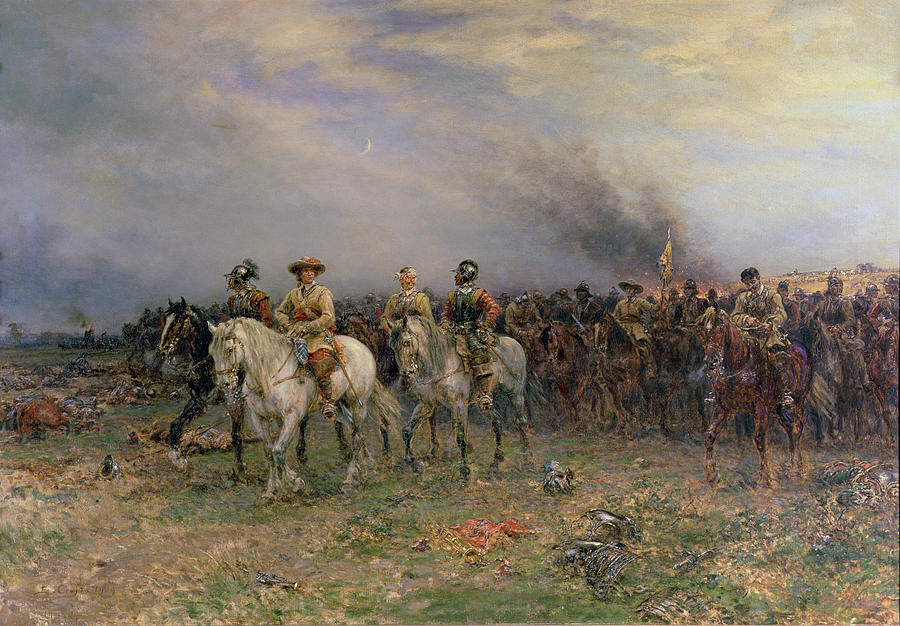
Cromwell at Marston Moor by Ernest Crofts

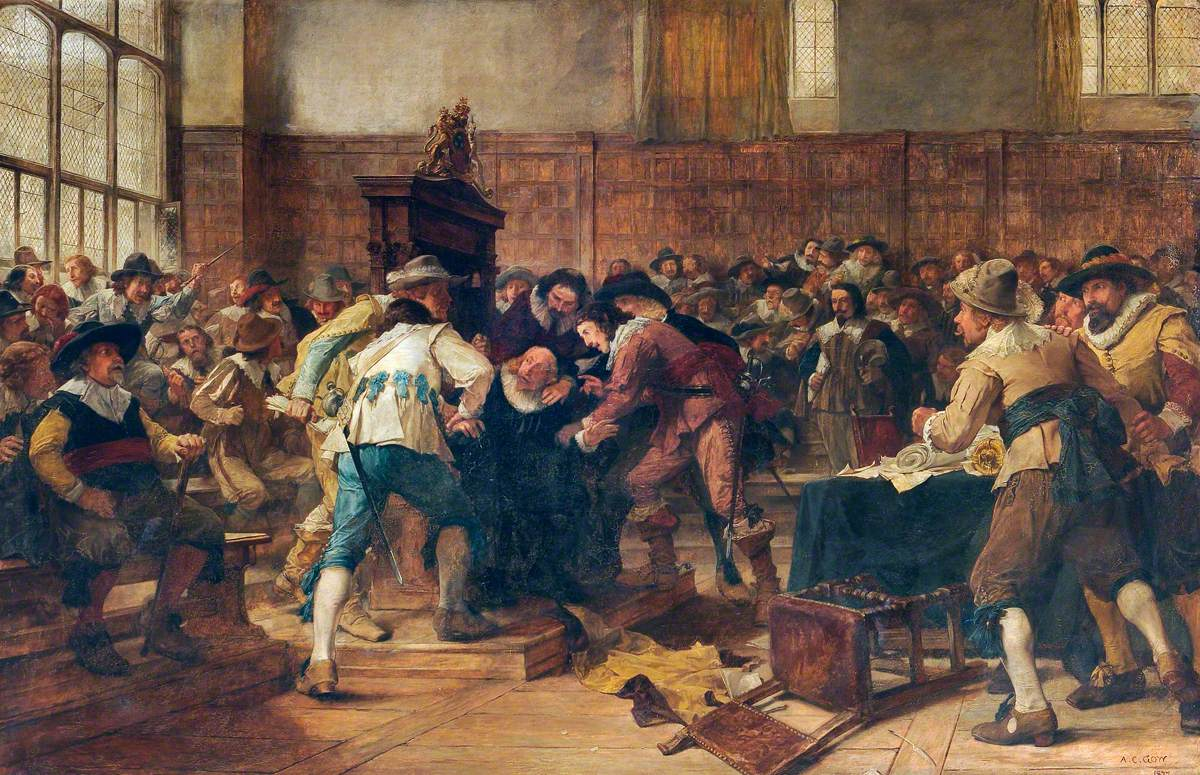
The Tumult in the House of Commons, 1629 by Andrew Carrick Gow

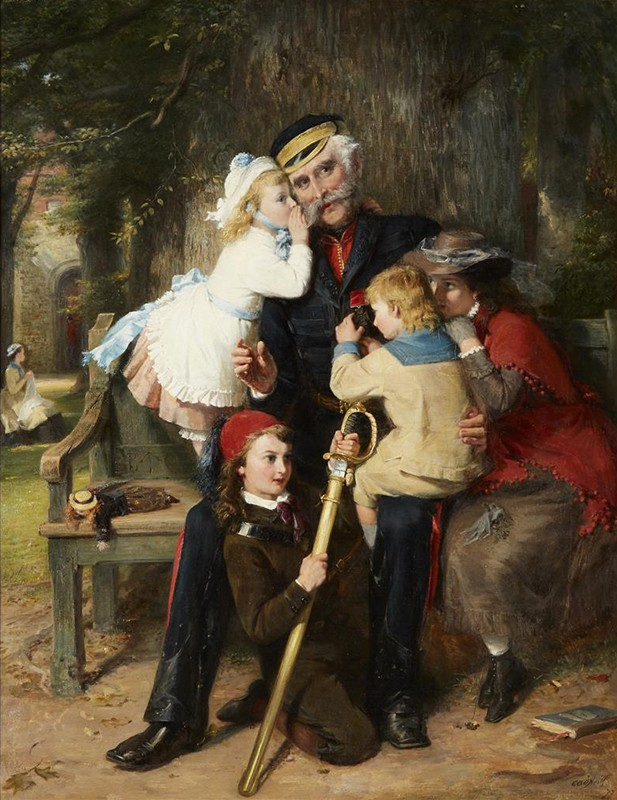
The Father of the Regiment by George Bernard O'Neill

Home They Brought Her Warrior Dead by Philip Hermogenes Calderon

Silkworms by Eyre Crowe

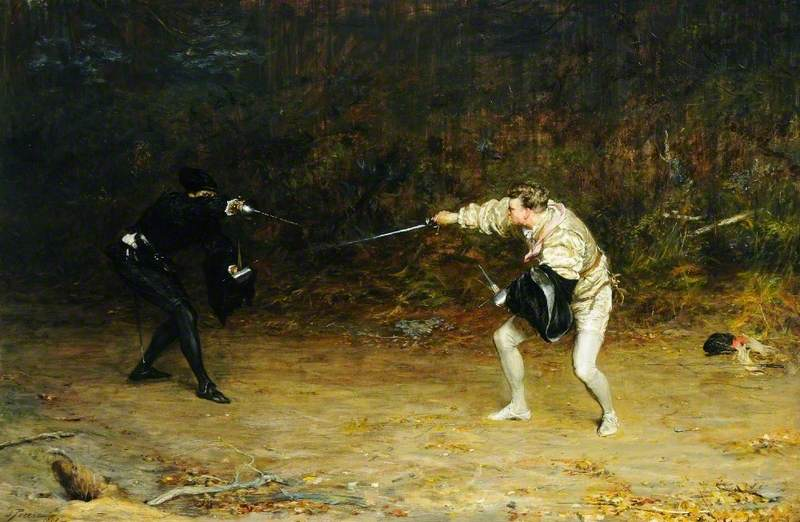
To the Death by John Pettie

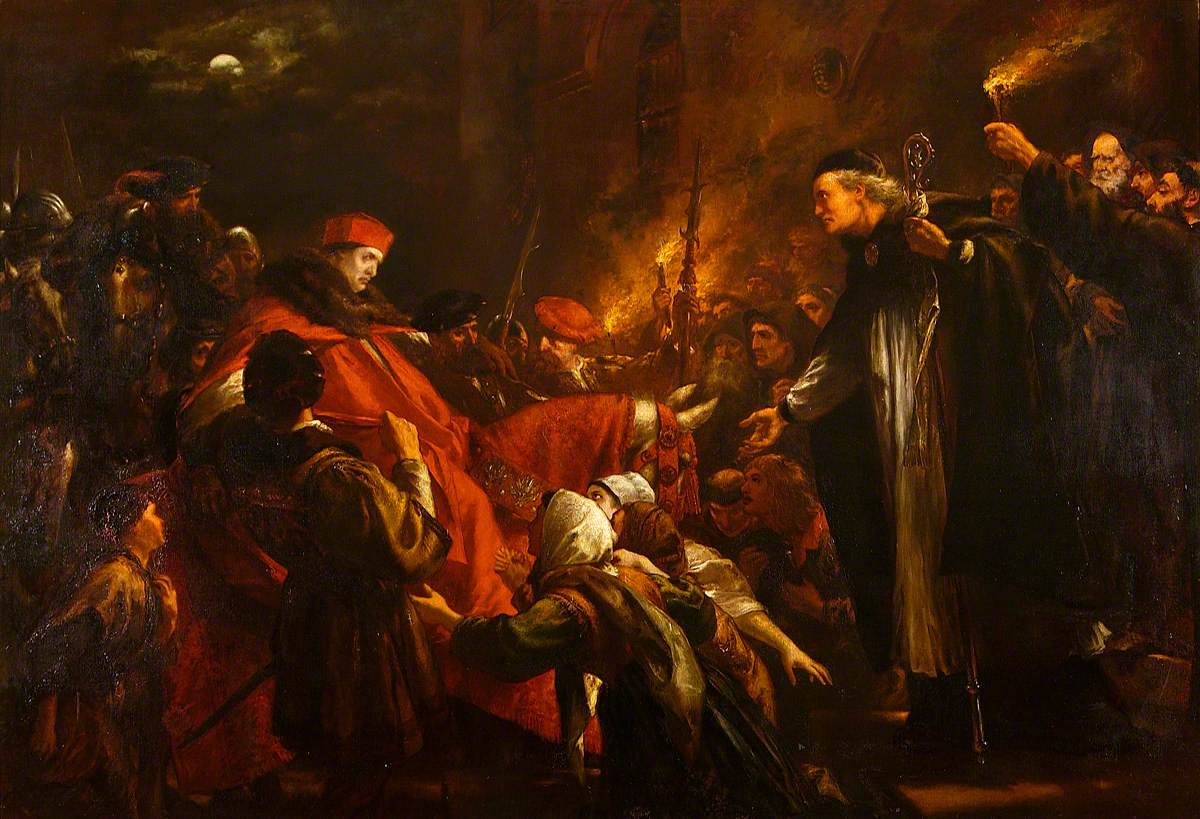
Cardinal Wolsey at Leicester Abbey by John Gilbert

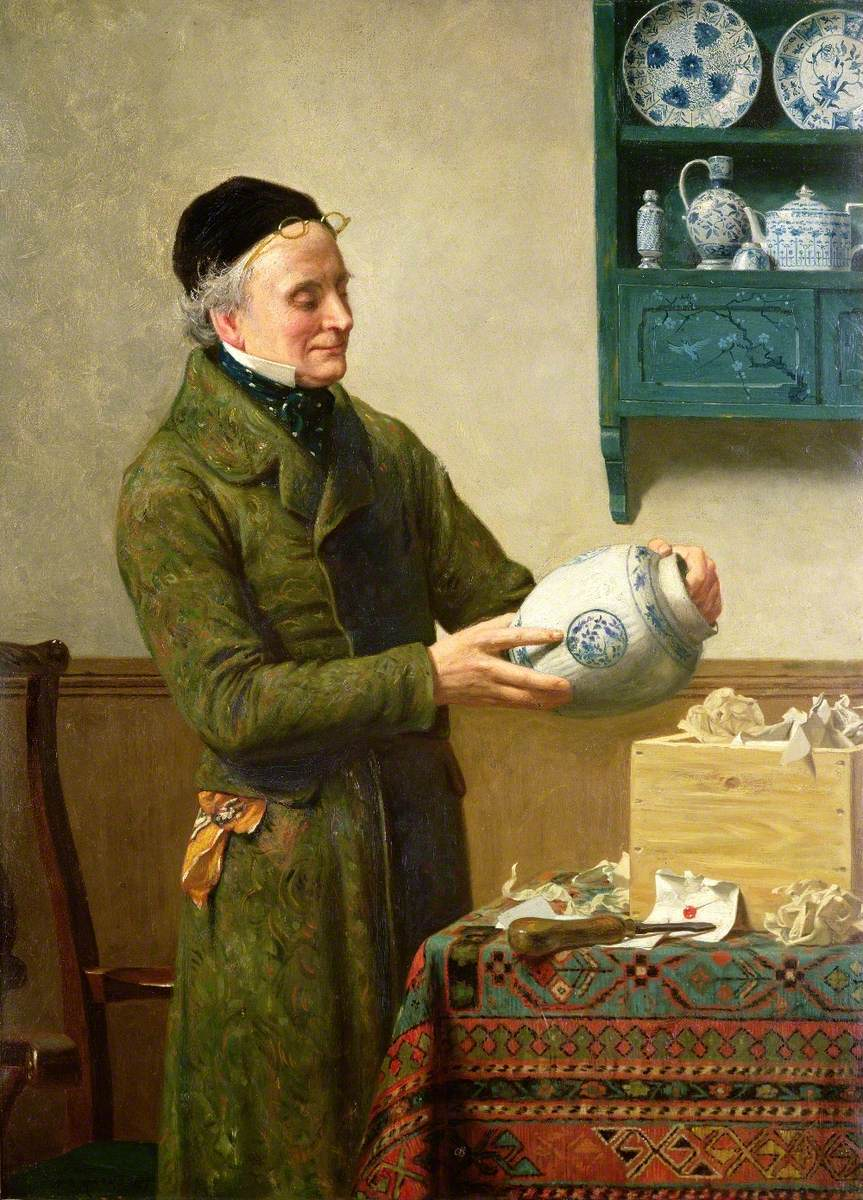
A Bit of Blue by Henry Stacy Marks

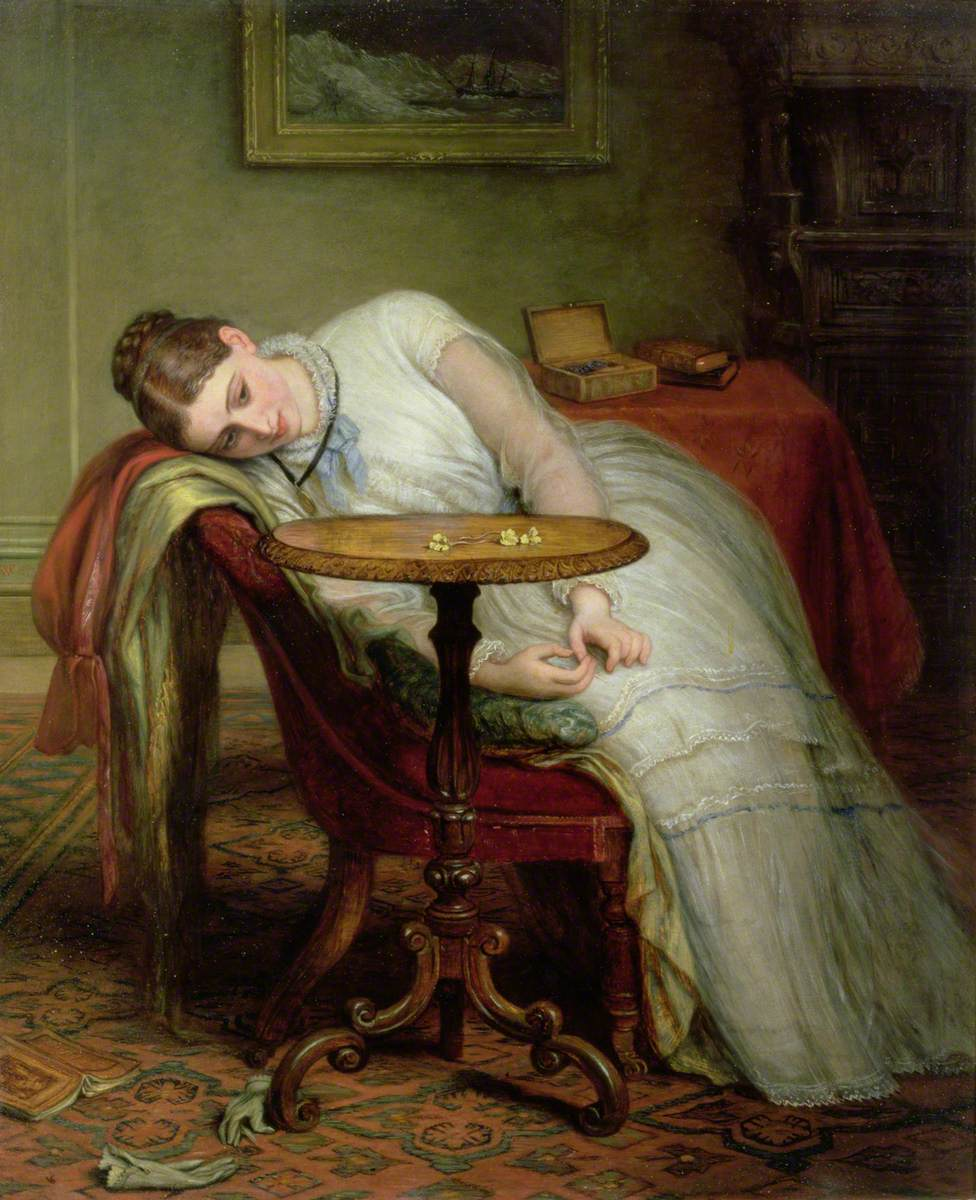
Hope Deferred by Charles West Cope

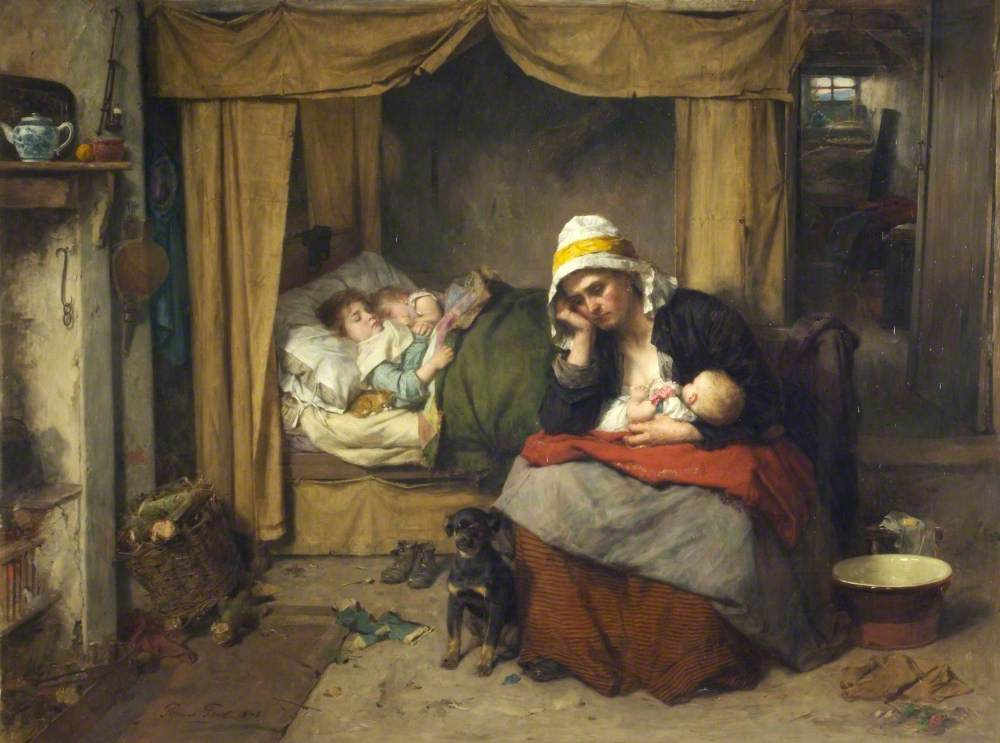
In Time of War by Thomas Faed

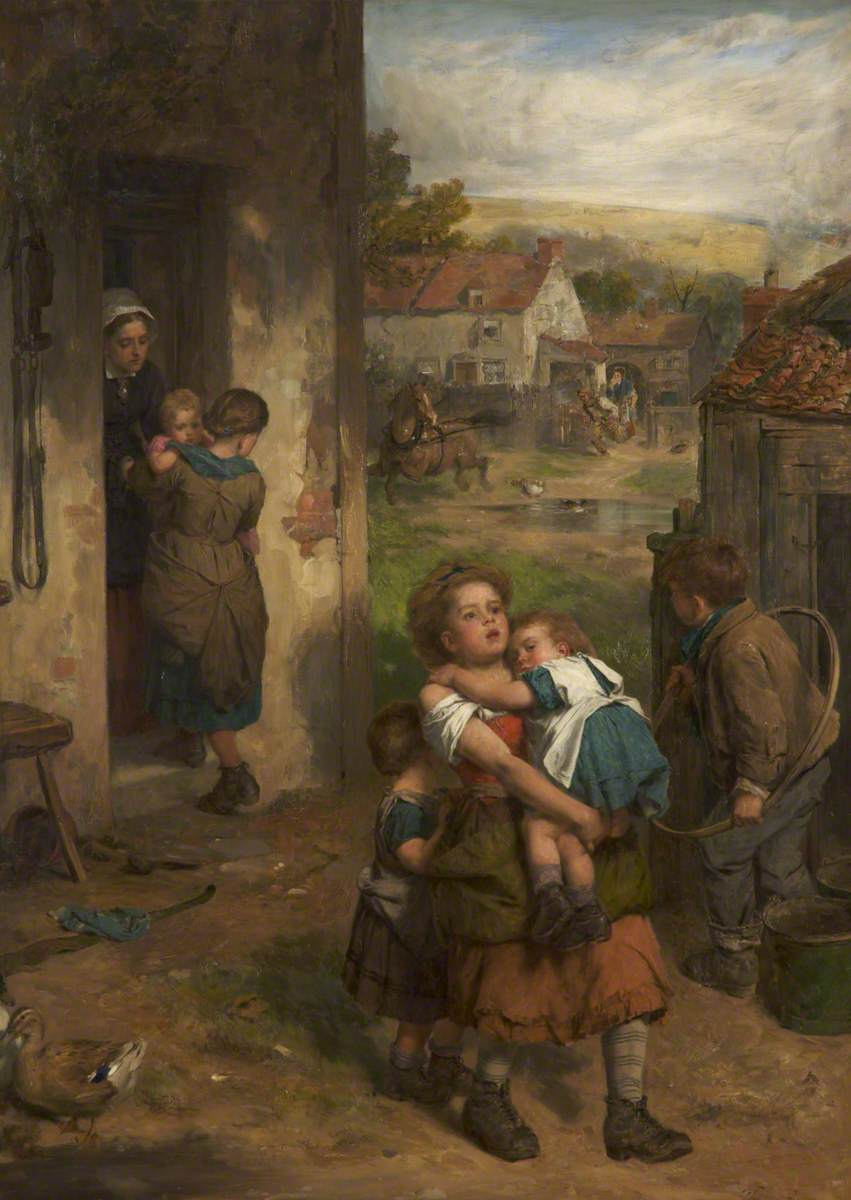
A Runaway Horse by Thomas Faed

The Dove by George Frederic Watts

Critics on Costume, Fashions Change by John Callcott Horsley

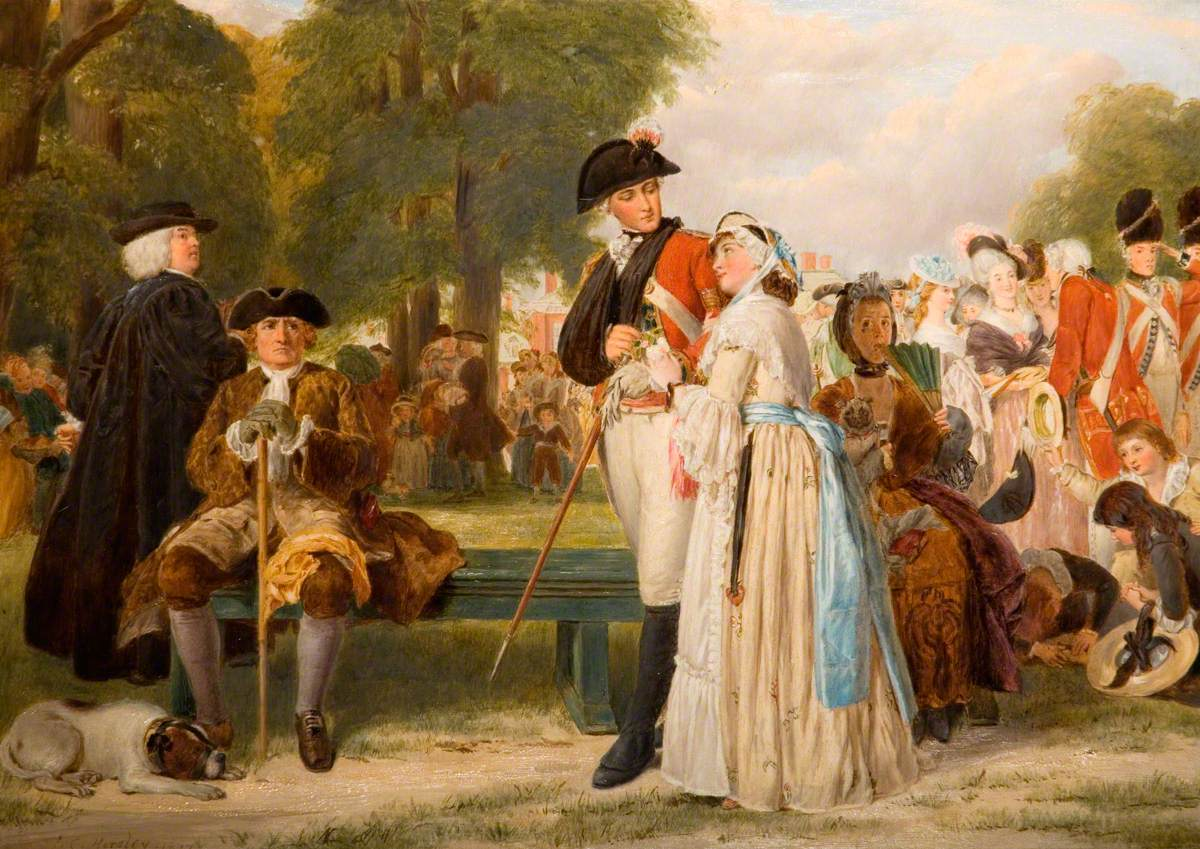
The World Forgetting, By the World Forgot by John Callcott Horsley

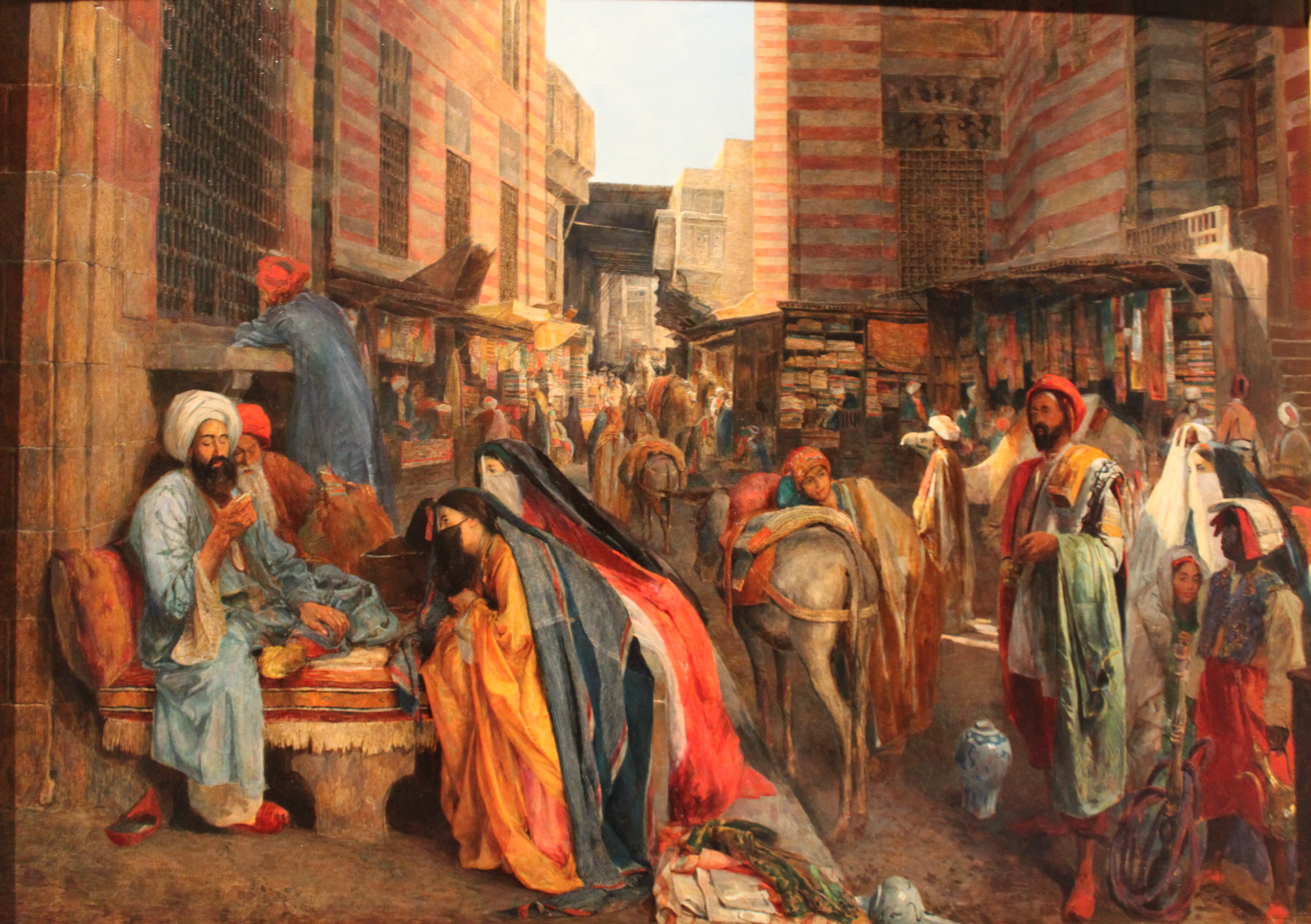
The Street and Mosque Al Ghouri in Cairo by John Frederick Lewis

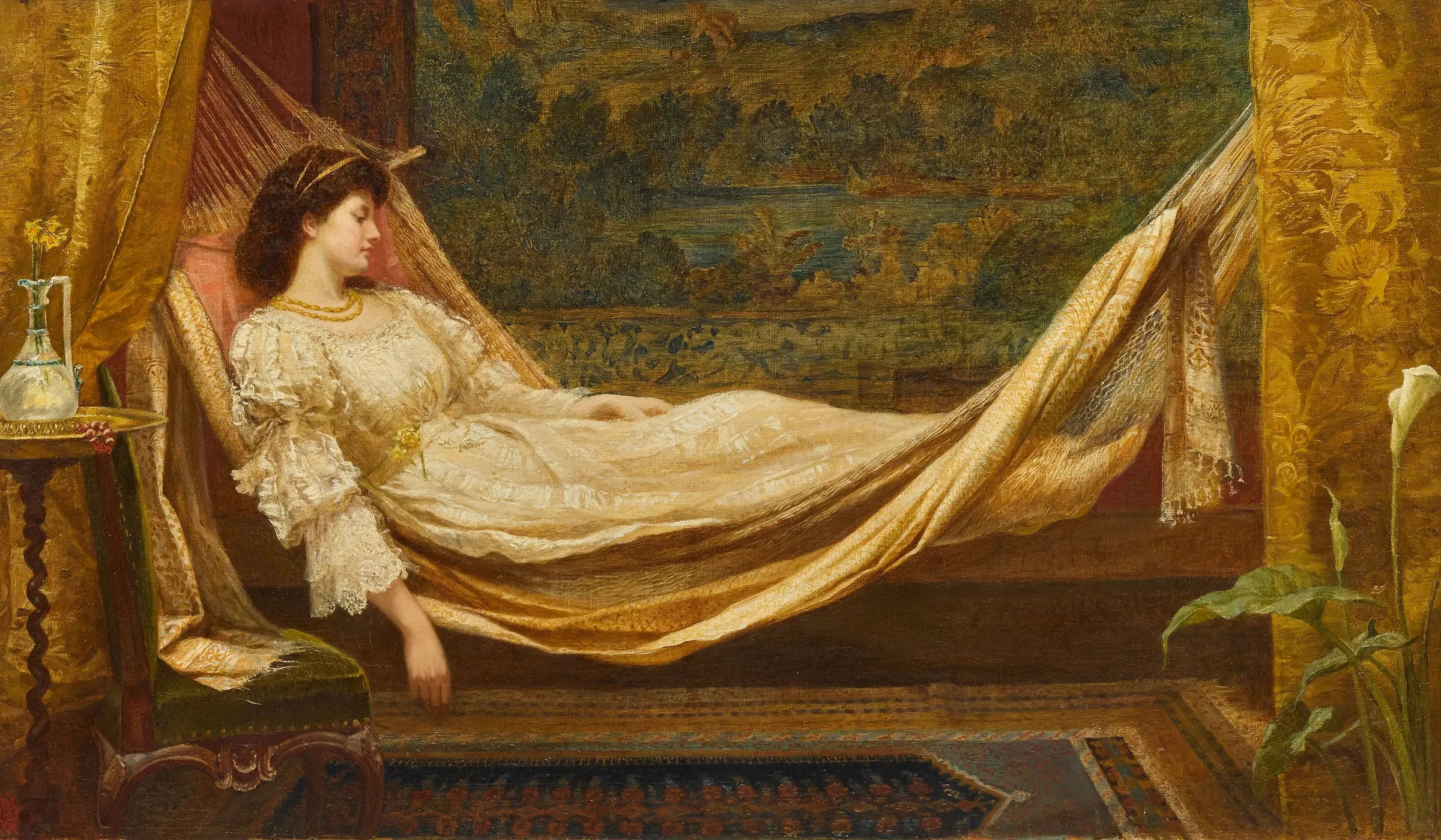
A Golden Daydream (1877) by Emily Mary Osborn

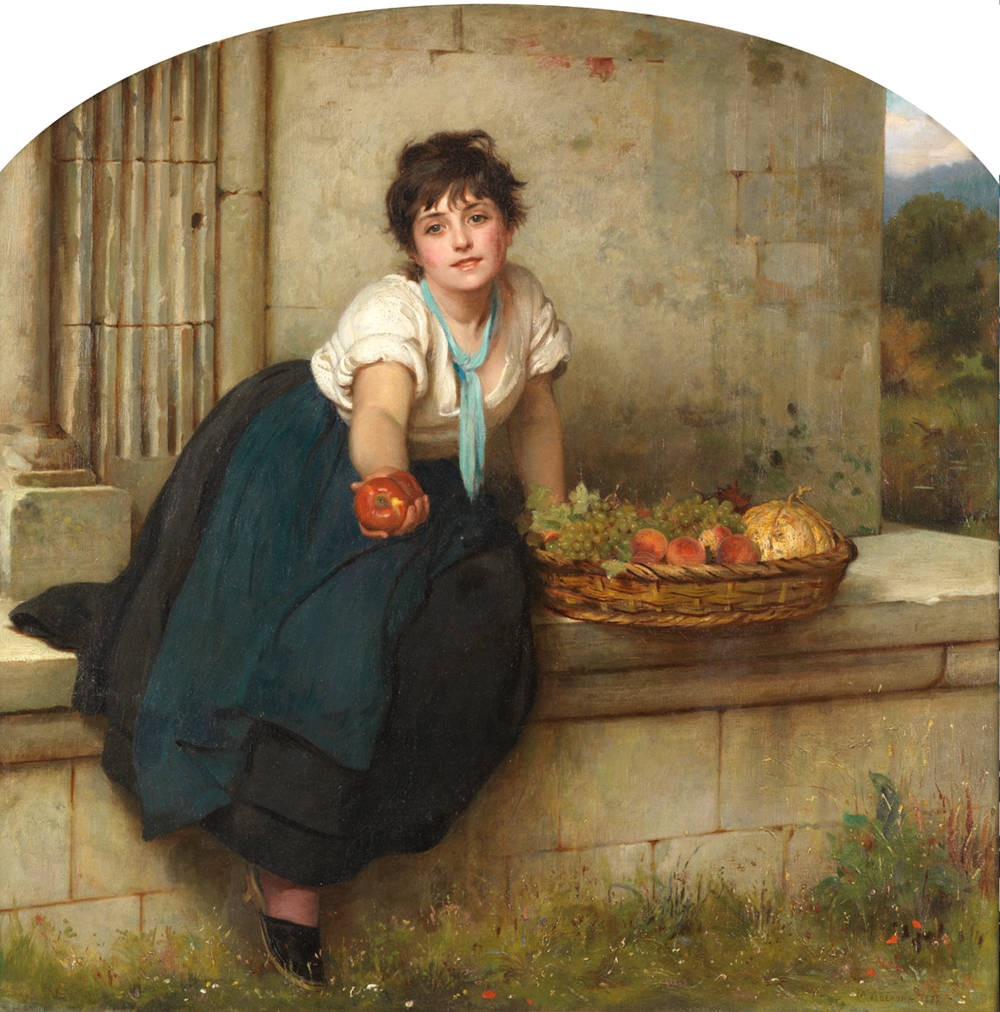
The Fruit Seller by Philip Hermogenes Calderon

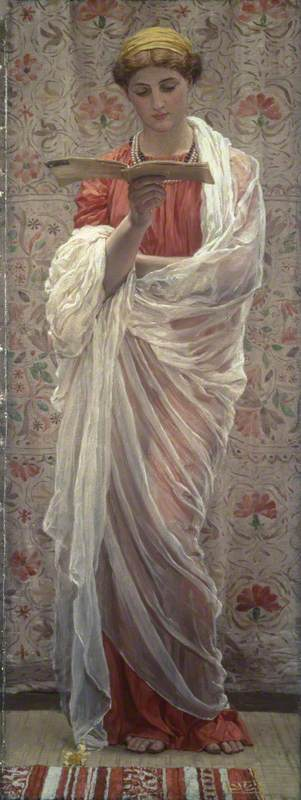
A Reader by Albert Joseph Moore

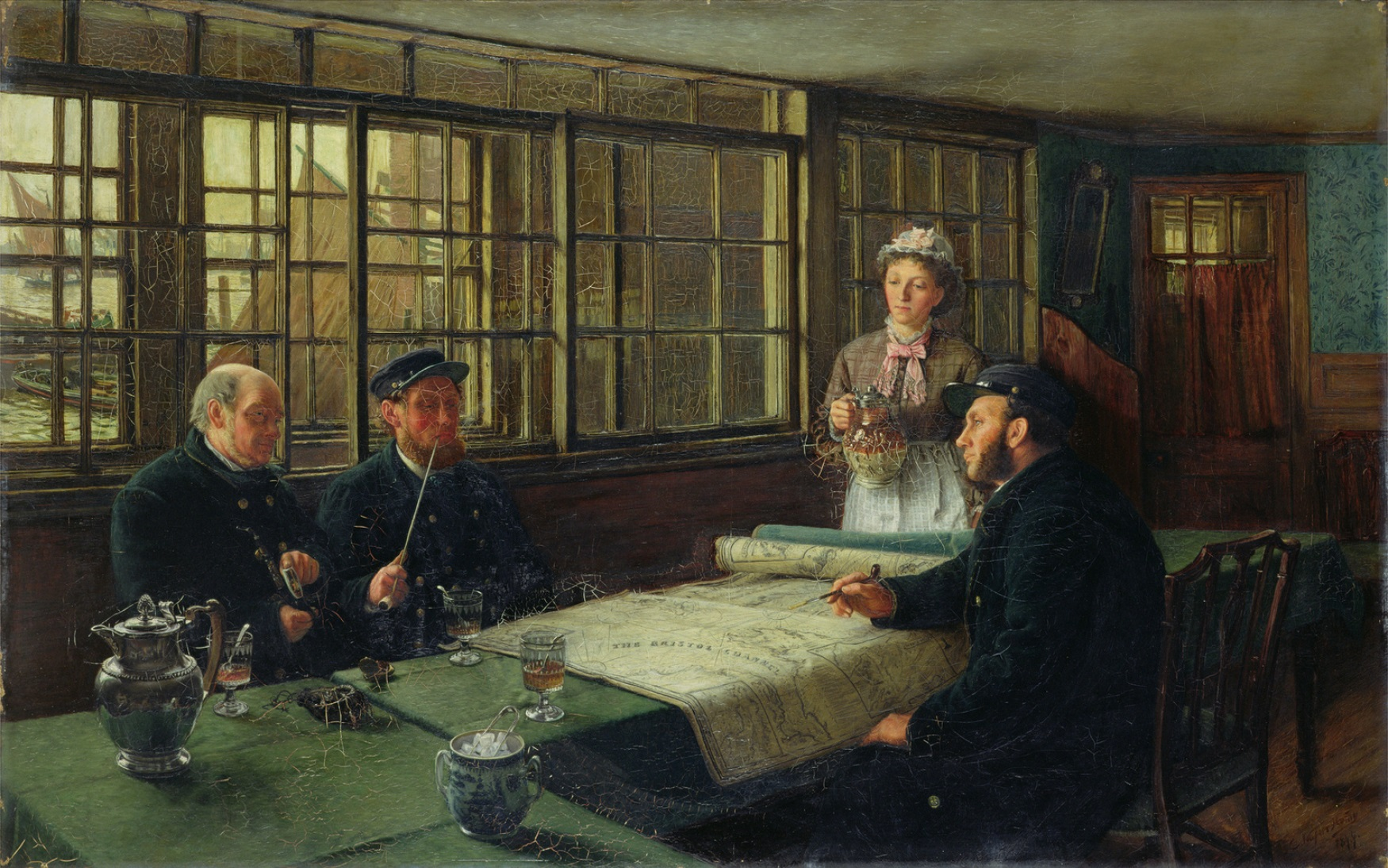
A Nautical Argument by Charles Napier Hemy

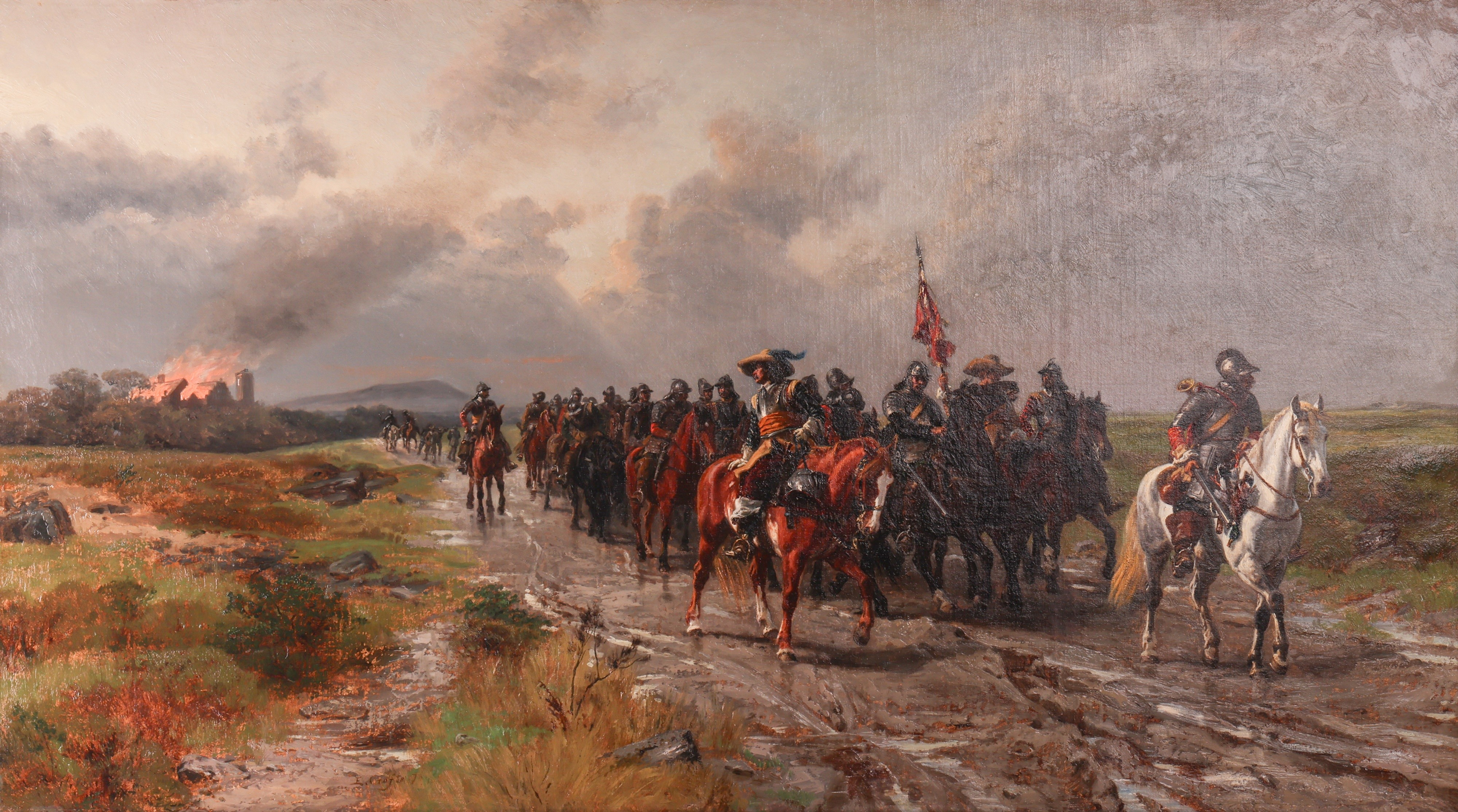
Ironsides Returning from Sacking a Cavalier's House by Ernest Crofts

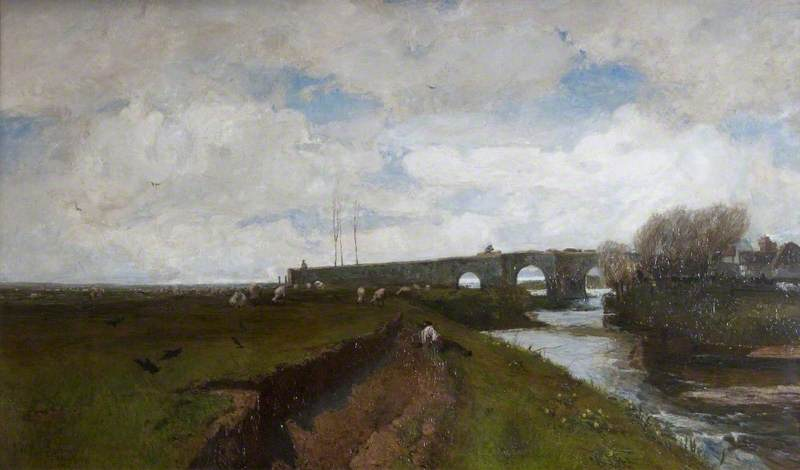
On the Medway, Breezy March by John Buxton Knight

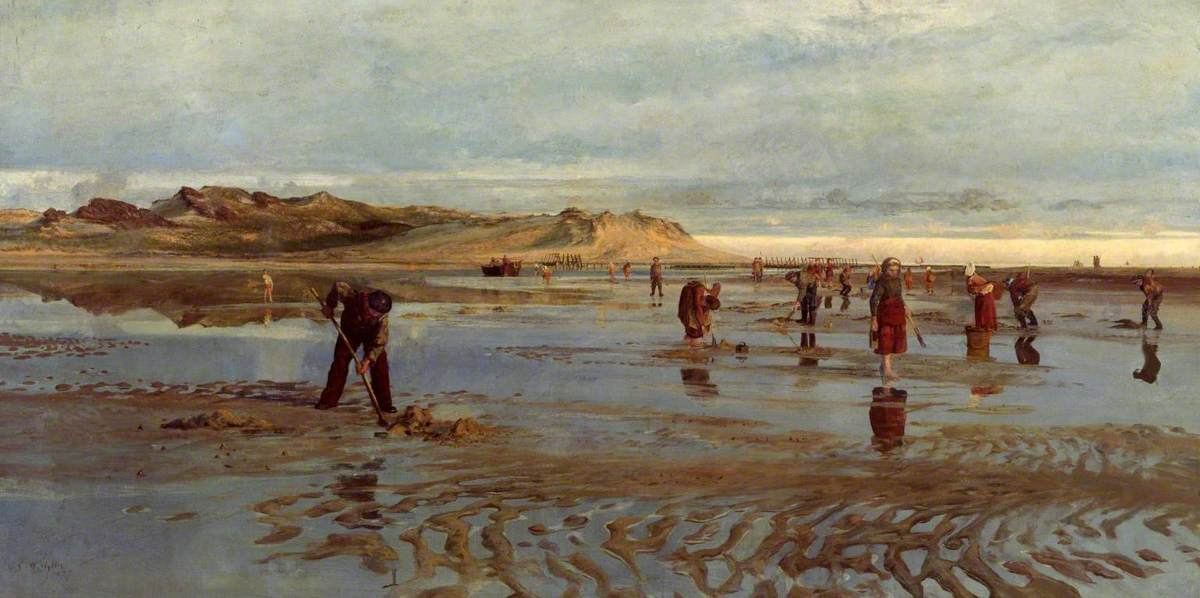
Digging for Bait by Charles William Wyllie

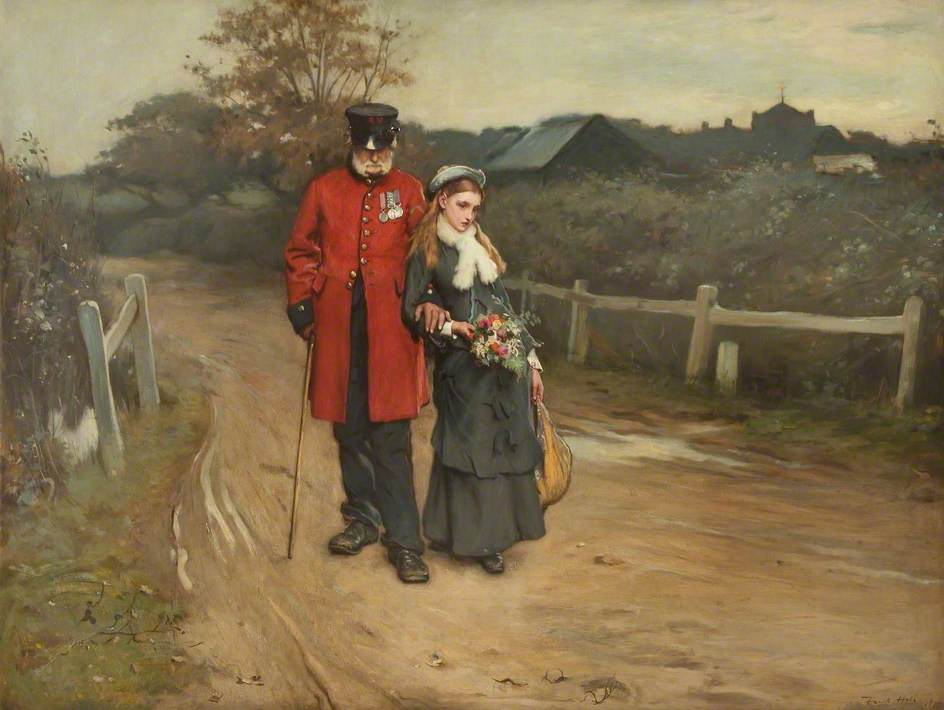
Going Home by Frank Holl

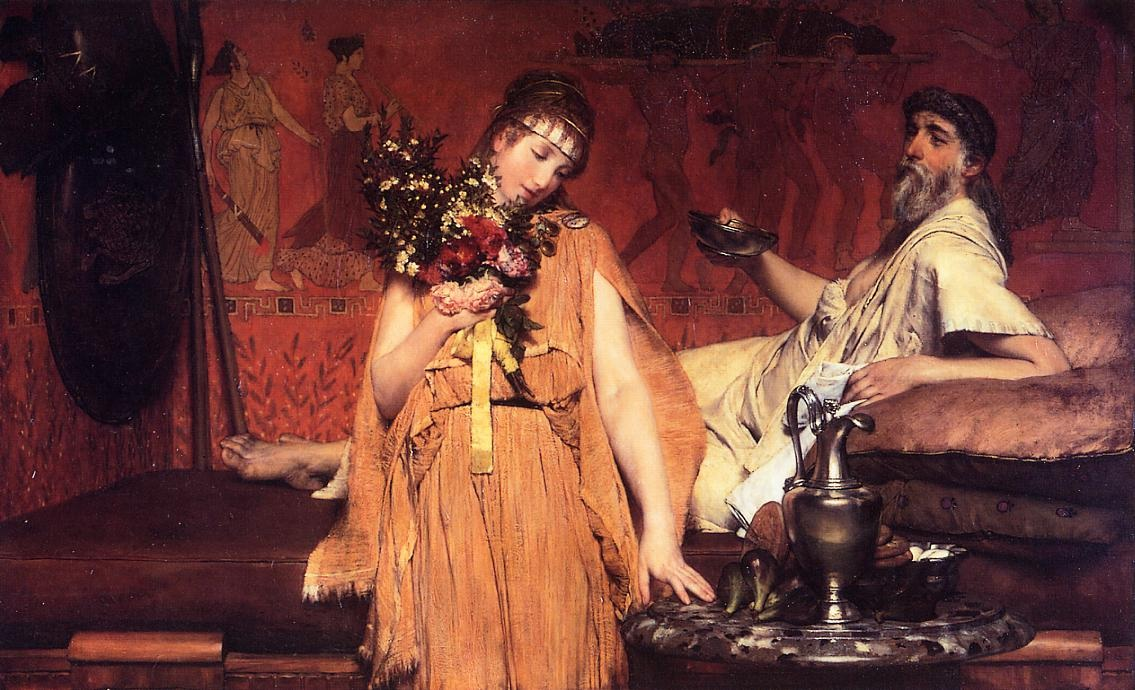
Between Hope and Fear by Lawrence Alma-Tadema

Sir Joshua Reynolds Visiting Goldsmith in His Study by John Faed

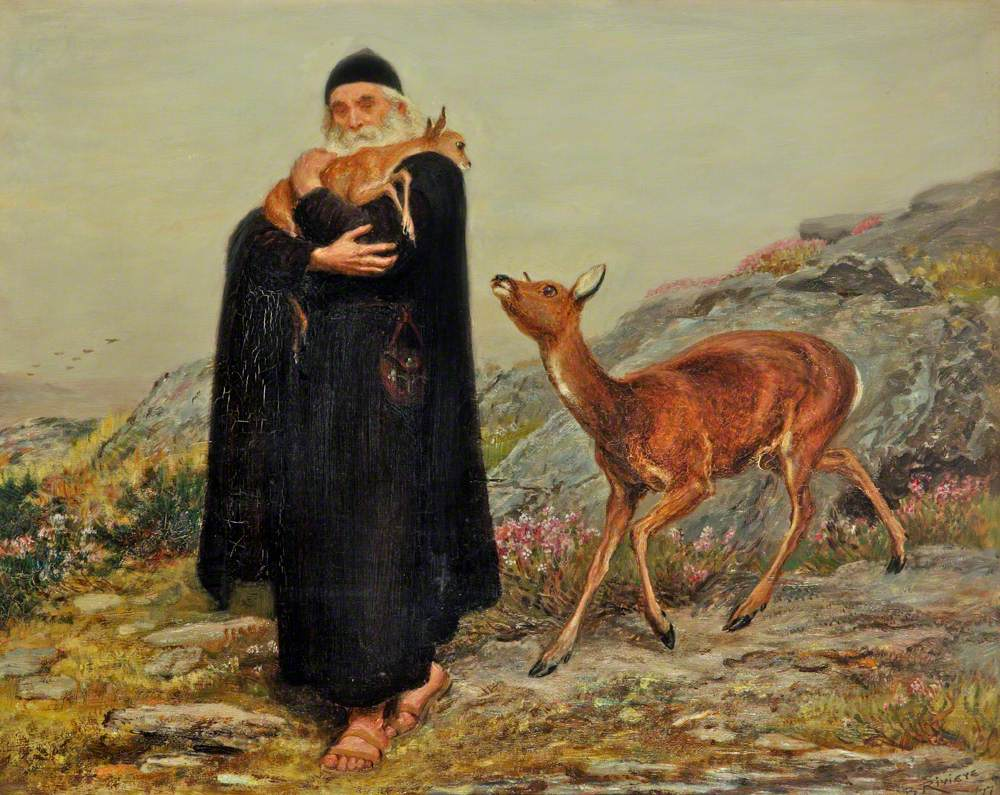
A Legend of Saint Patrick by Briton Riviere

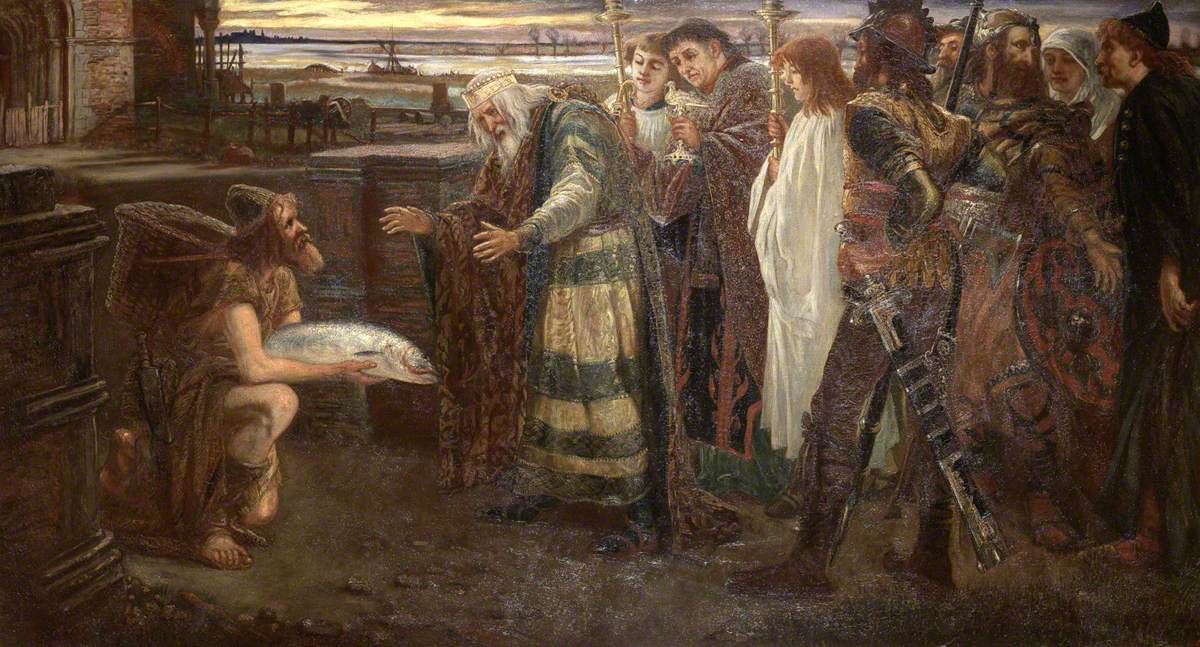
Edric the Fisherman Presents a Fish as a Token from Saint Peter on the Consecration of Westminster Abbey by Andrew Benjamin Donaldson

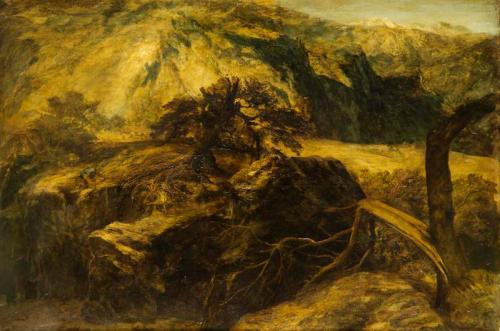
The Dragon's Cavern by Paul Falconer Poole

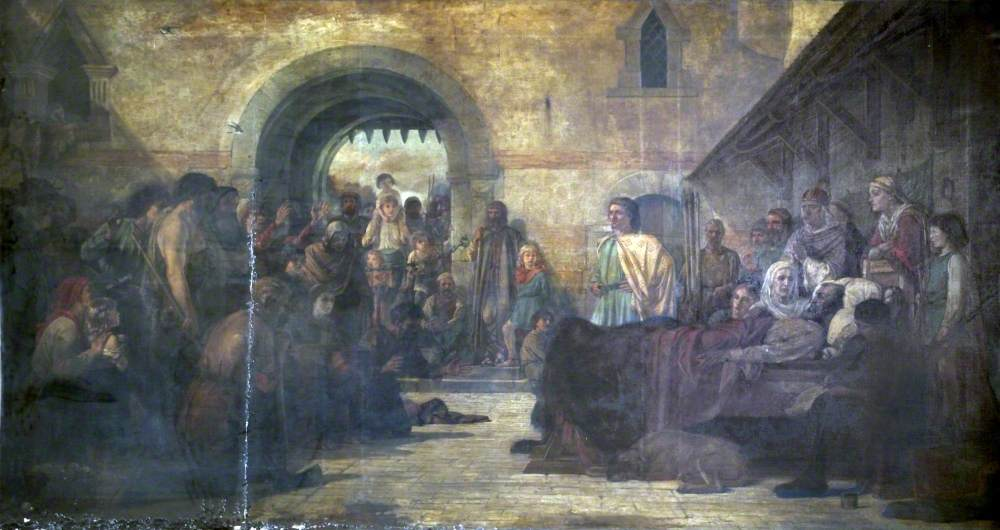
Serf Emancipation by Edward Armitage

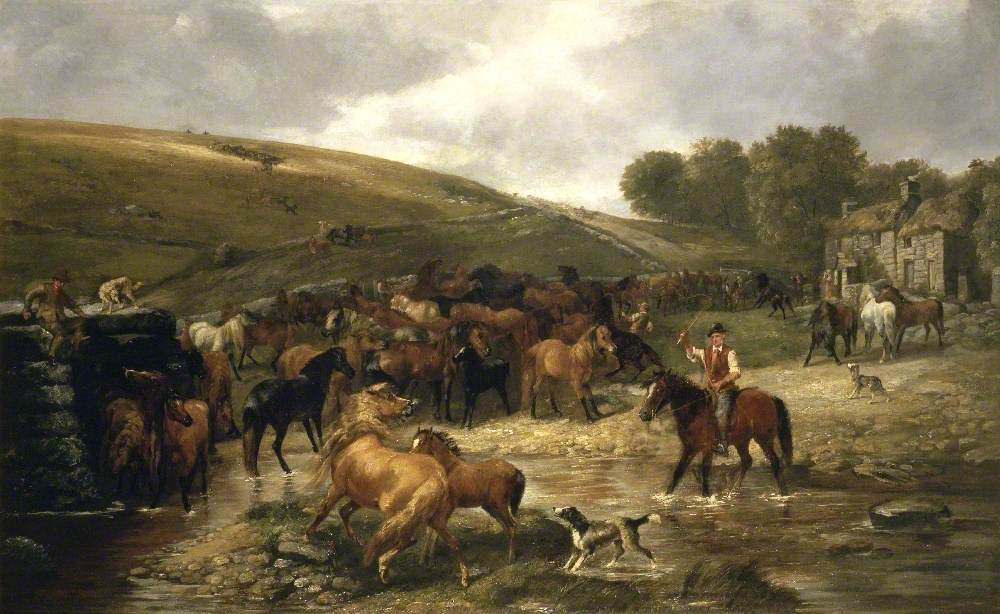
Dartmoor Drift by Arthur James Stark

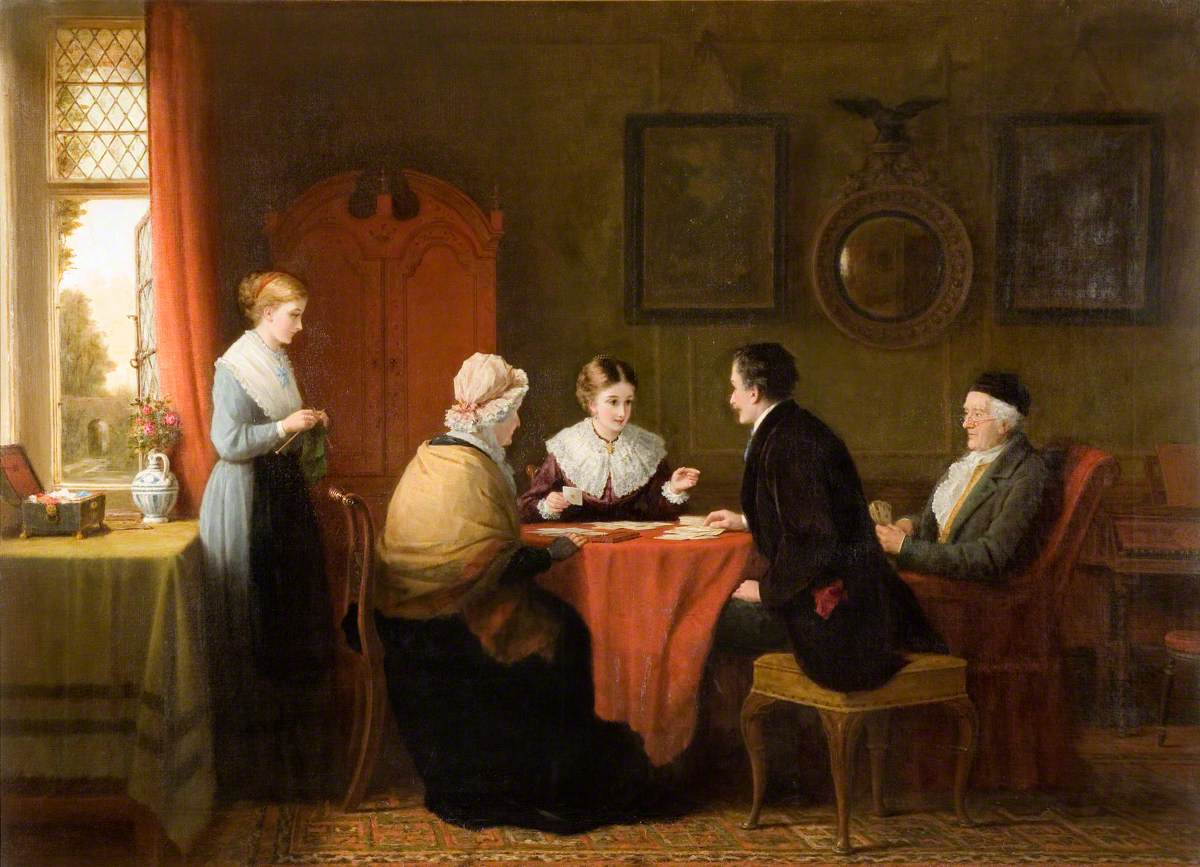
The Misdeal by Frederick Daniel Hardy

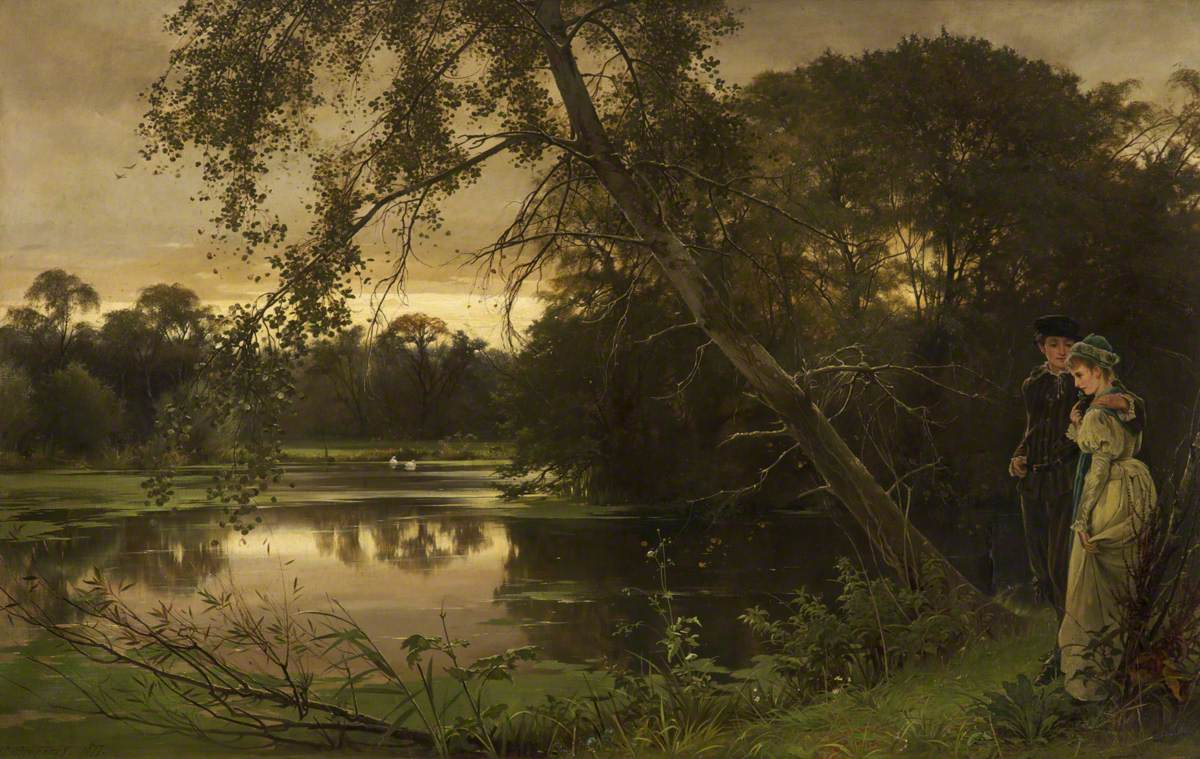
Still Waters Run Deep by Edward Henry Fahey

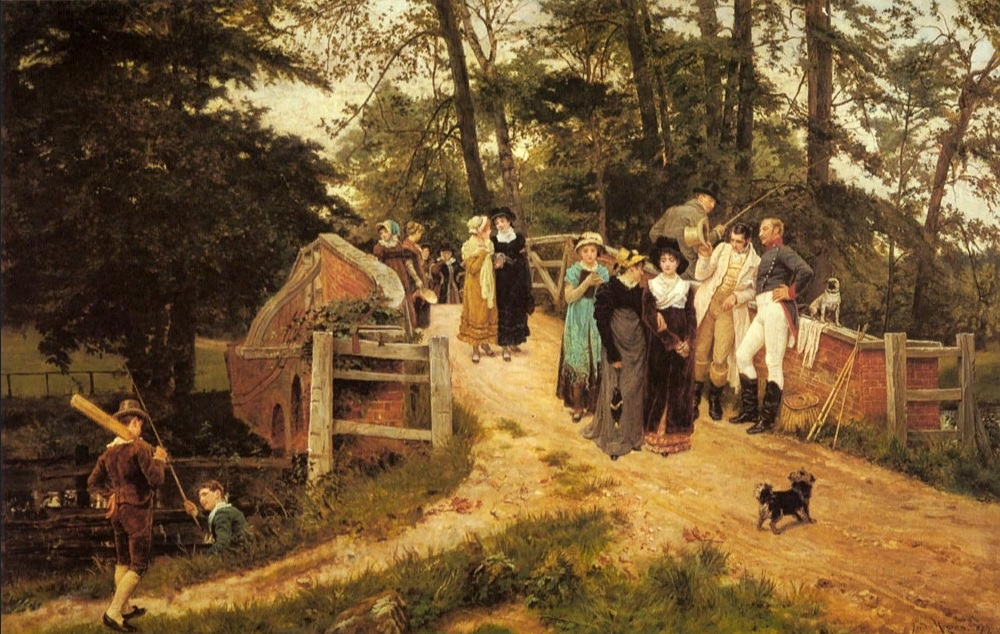
The School Belles by Frederick Morgan

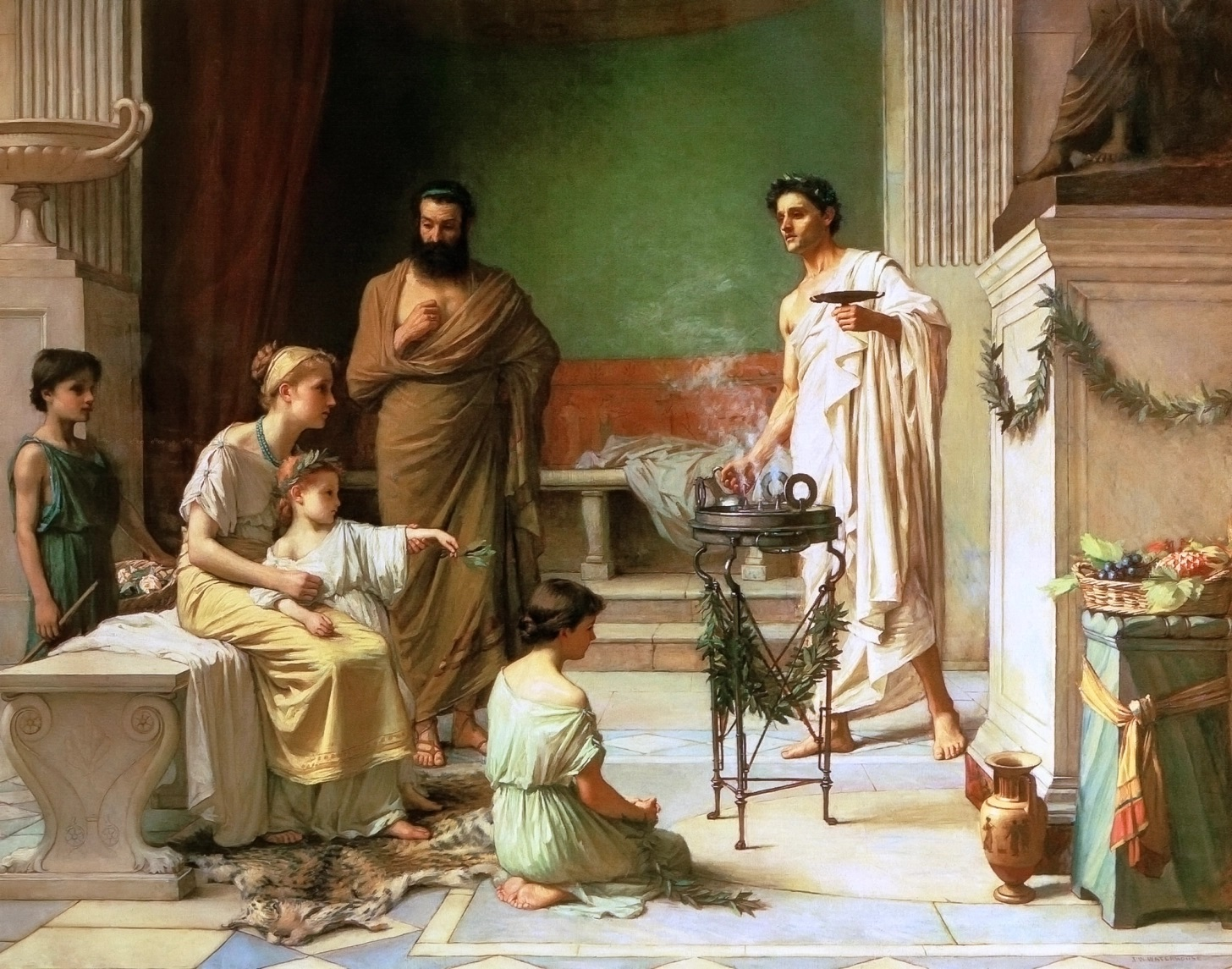
A Sick Child brought into the Temple of Aesculapius by John William Waterhouse

Captain Absolute's Introduction to Lydia Languish by William Maw Egley

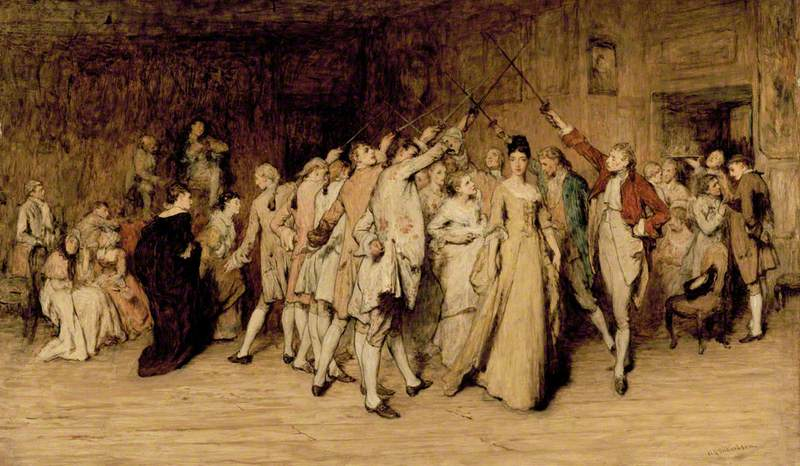
The Queen of the Swords, oil sketch by William Quiller Orchardson

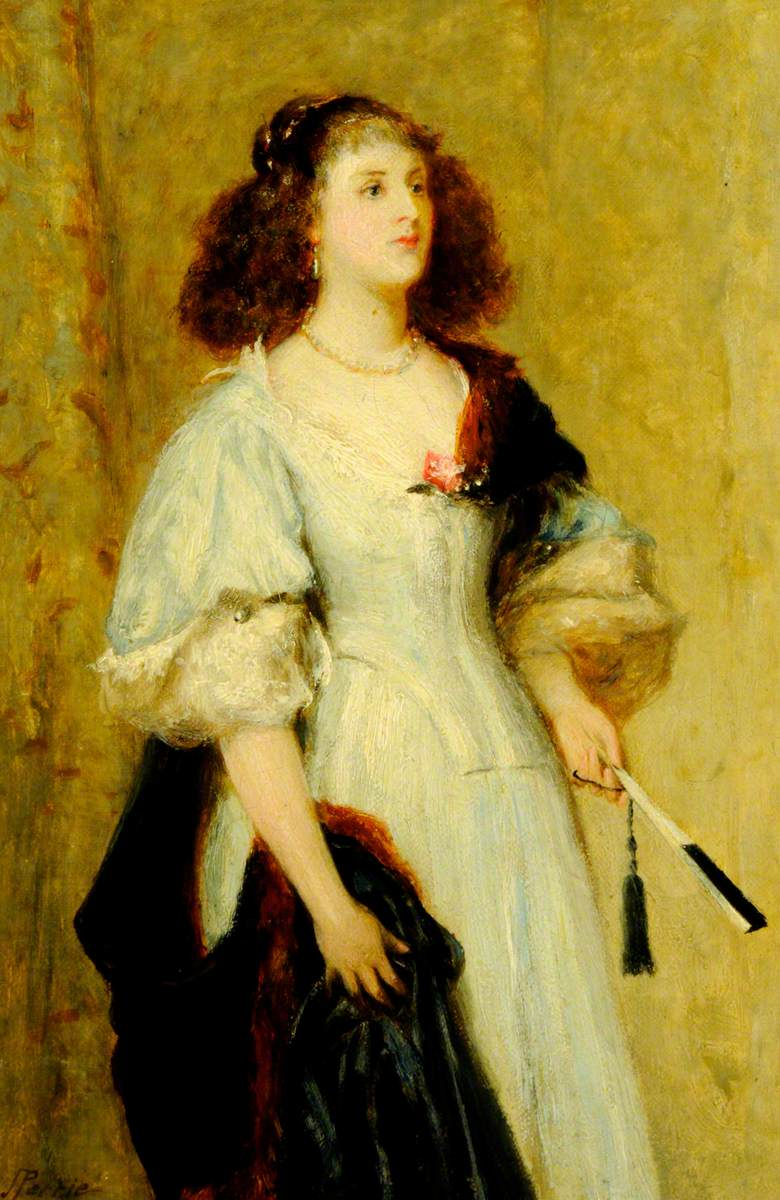
A Lady of the Seventeenth Century by John Pettie

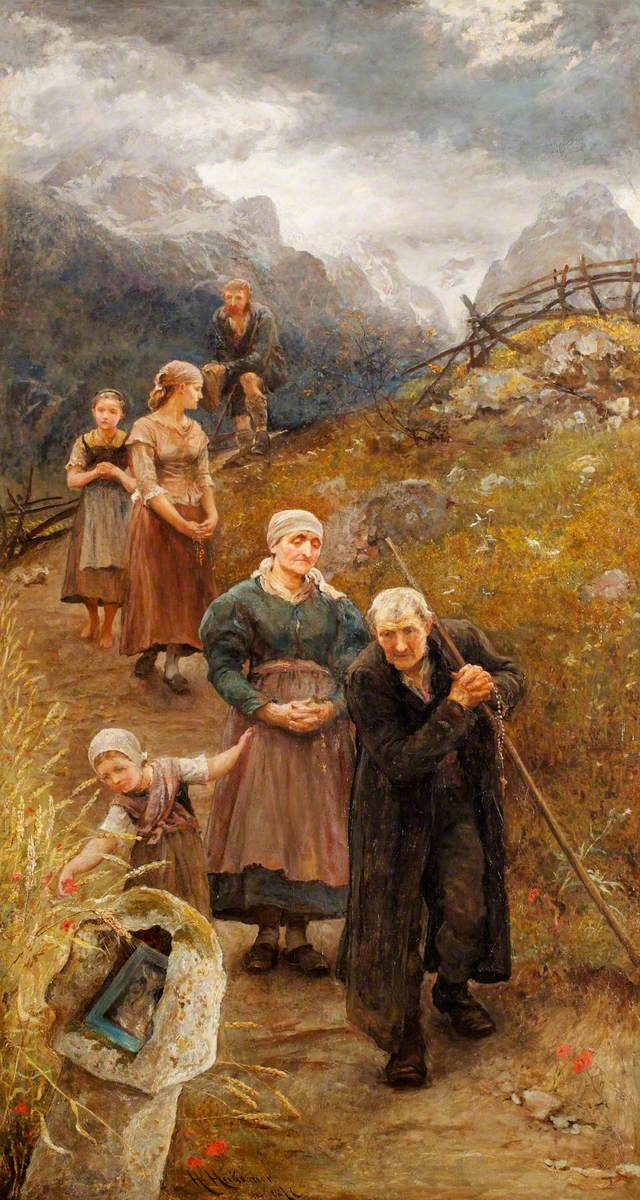
Der Bittgang by Hubert von Herkomer

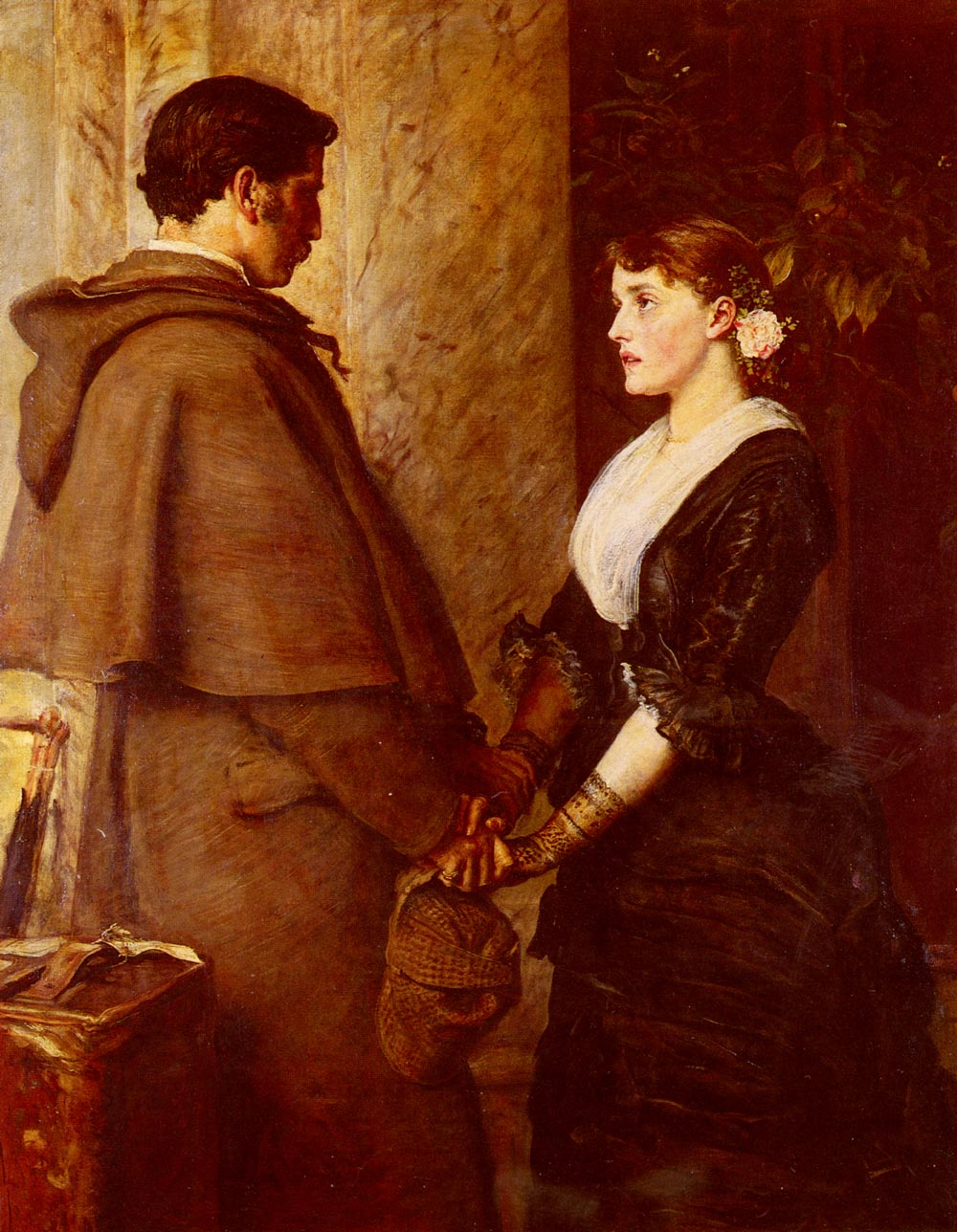
Yes by John Everett Millais

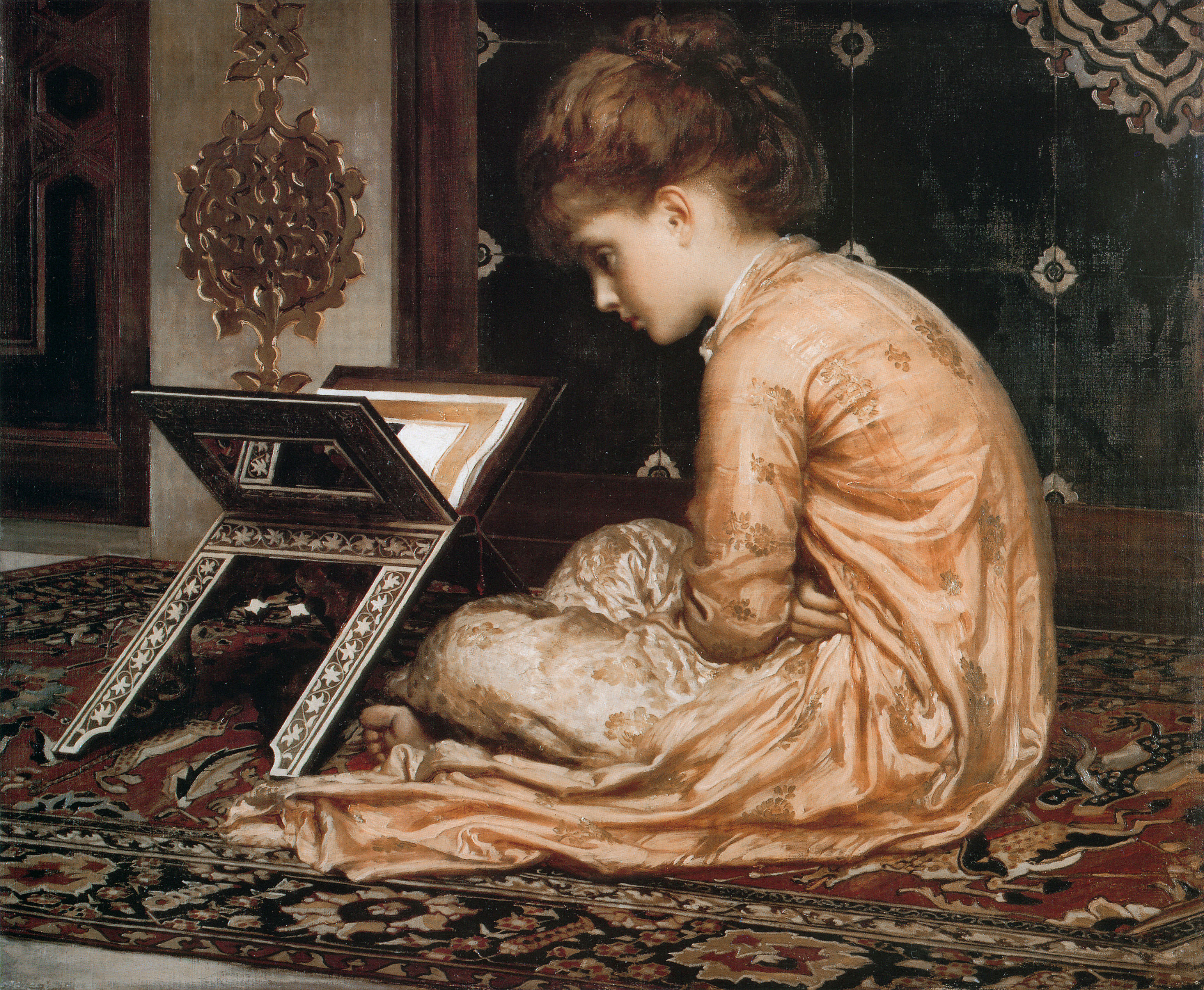
Study at a Reading Desk by Frederic Leighton

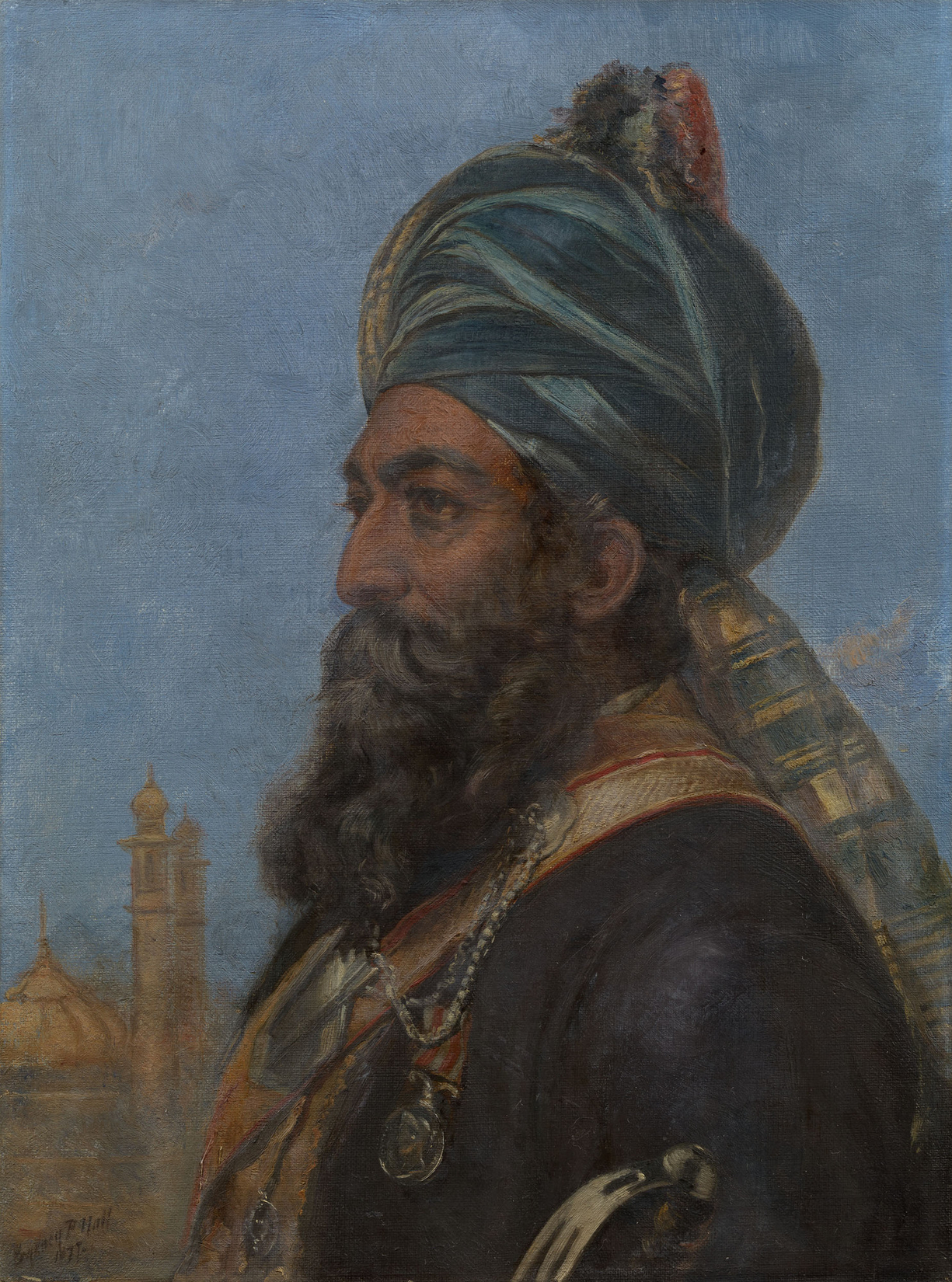
Portrait of Risaldar Muhammed Afzul Khan by Sydney Prior Hall

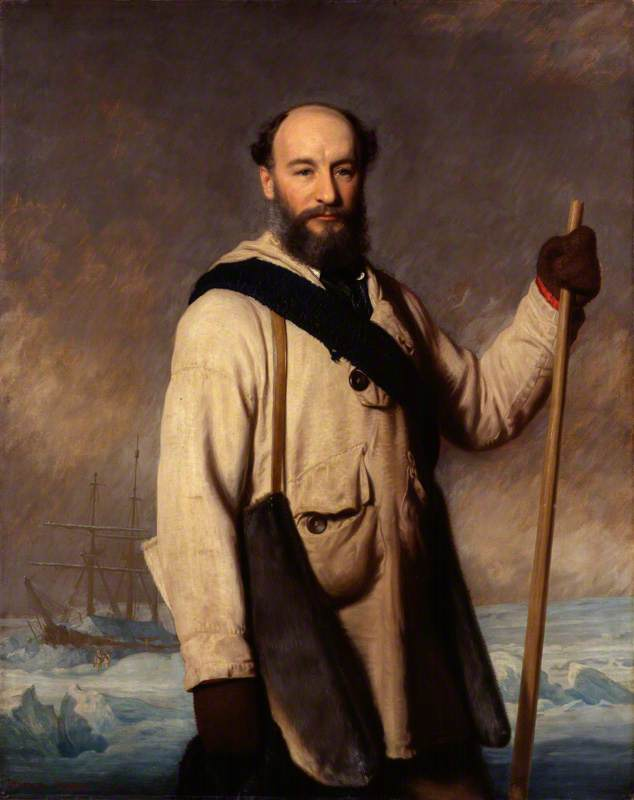
Portrait of George Nares by Stephen Pearce

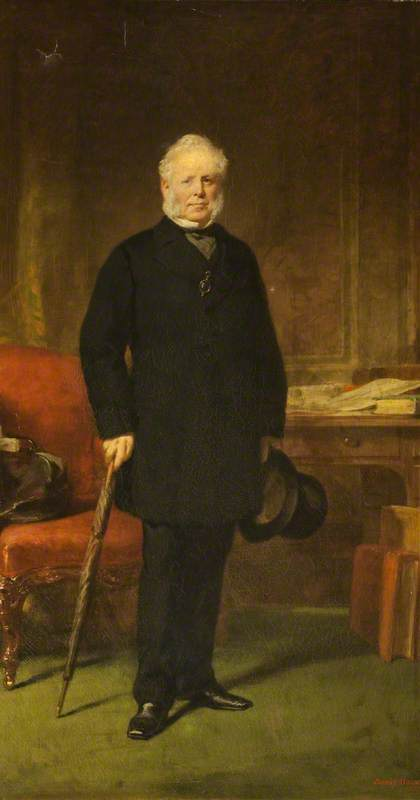
Portrait of John Shepherd Birley by Daniel Macnee

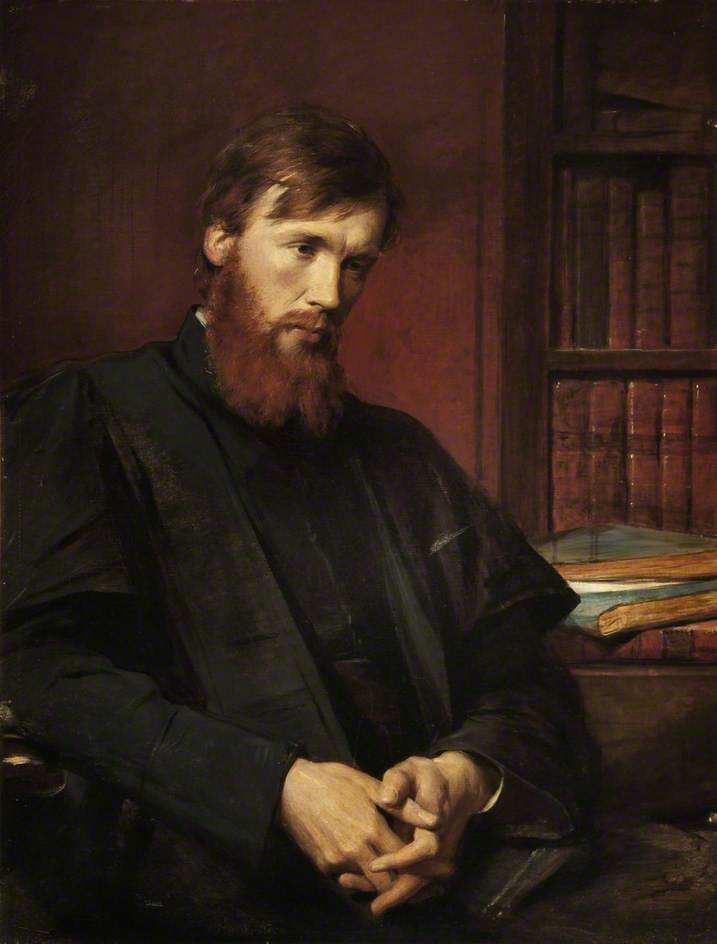
Portrait of Edward Stuart Talbot by George Richmond

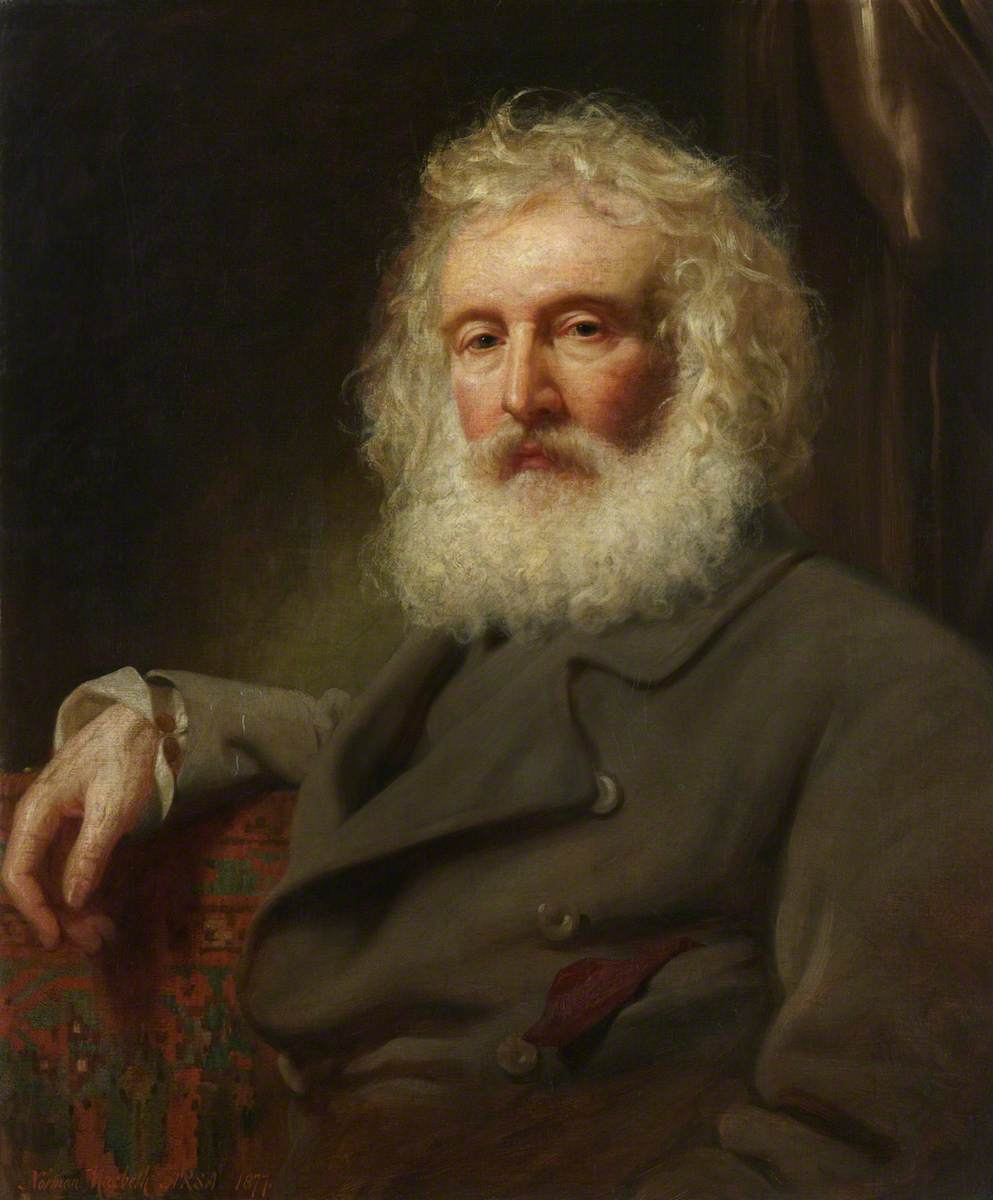
Portrait of John Steell by Norman Macbeth

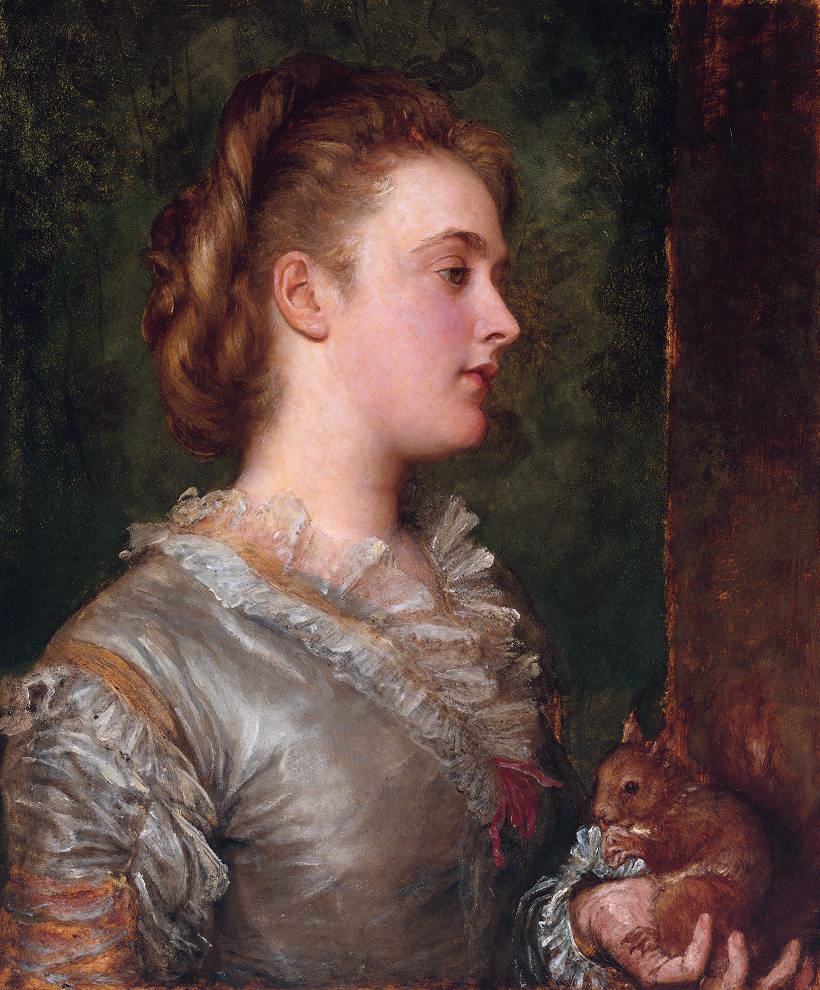
Portrait of Dorothy Tennant by George Frederic Watts

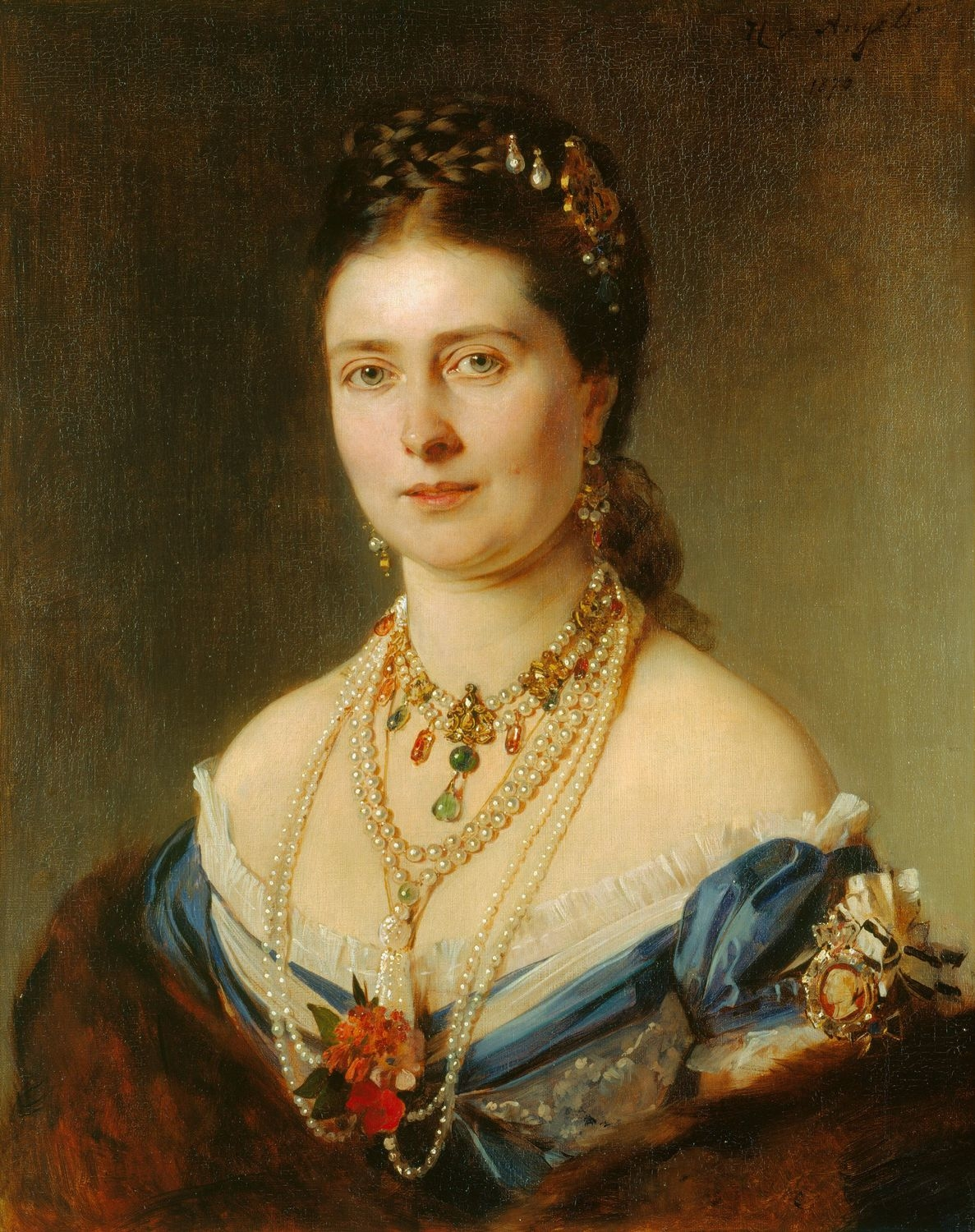
Portrait of Victoria, Princess Royal by Heinrich von Angeli

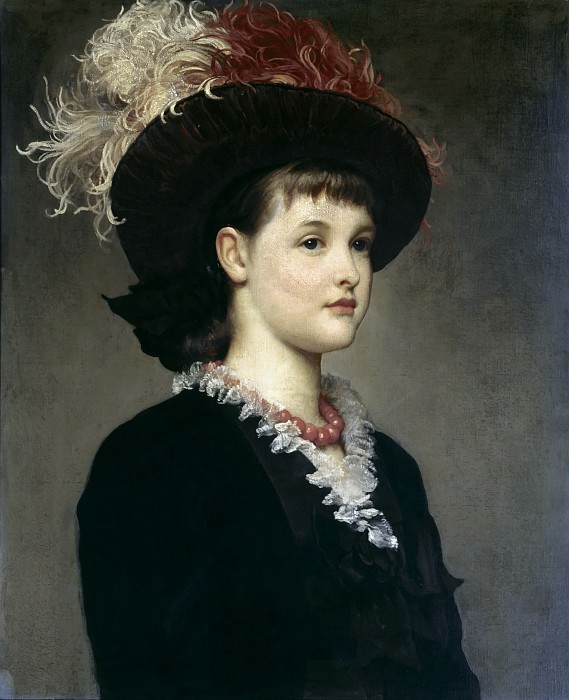
Miss Mabel Mills by Frederic Leighton

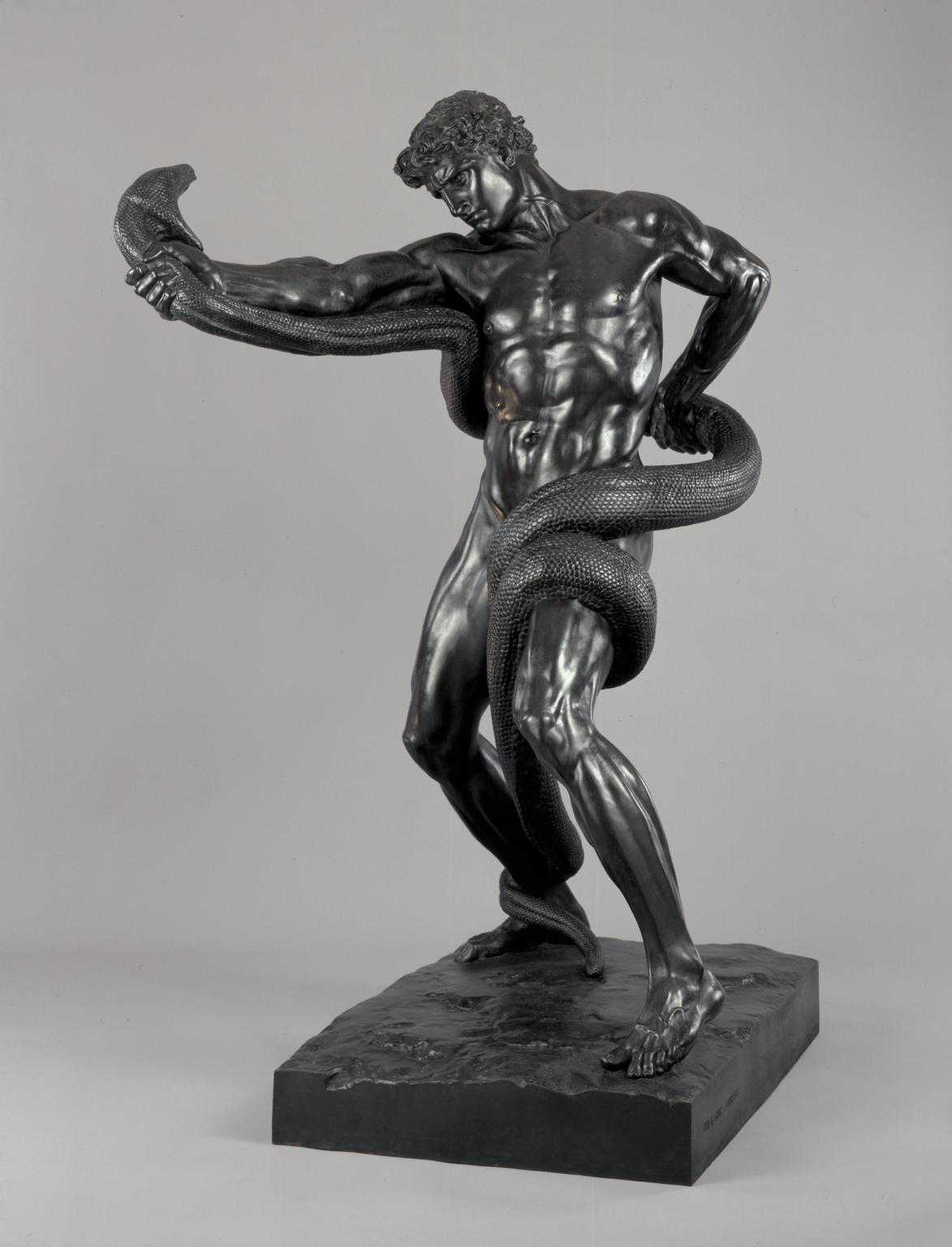
An Athlete Wrestling with a Python by Frederic Leighton

== See also ==
- Grosvenor Gallery Exhibition of 1877, the inaugural edition of rival London gallery exhibition

== Bibliography ==
- Barlow, Paul. Time Present and Time Past: The Art of John Everett Millais. Routledge, 2017.
- Grand-Clément, Adeline & Ribeyrol, Charlotte (ed.) The Smells and Senses of Antiquity in the Modern Imagination. Bloomsbury Academic, 2023.
- Dafforne, James. The Life and Works of Edward Matthew Ward. Virtue and Company, 1879.
