= The Finding of Moses (Goodall) =

Painting by Frederick Goodall

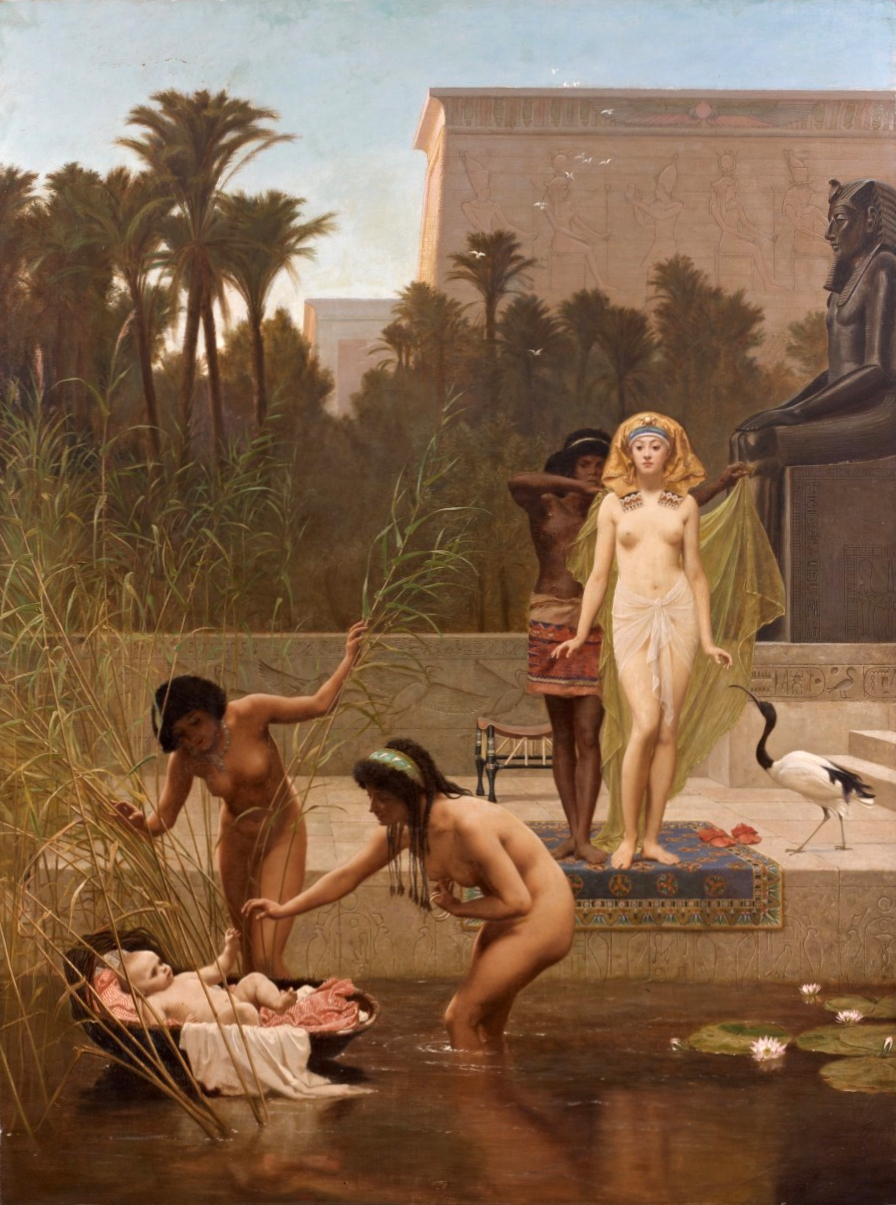
- Artist: Frederick Goodall
- Year: 1885
- Type: Oil on canvas, history painting
- Dimensions: 152.4 cm × 114.2 cm (60.0 in × 45.0 in)
- Location: Private collection

The Finding of Moses is an 1885 history painting by the British artist Frederick Goodall. It depicts the biblical scene of the baby Moses, cast adrift on the River Nile in a basket, being discovered in the bullrushes by the daughter of the Egyptian Pharaoh and her ladies. Her father Ramses II had issued an edict that all Jewish children be put to death, but she instead takes him in. The Finding of Moses was a popular one in art from the Renaissance onwards. As was common during the nineteenth century, Goodall blends religious art work with a nude composition. The work was an inspiration for the film director Cecil B. DeMille's epic The Ten Commandments. The painting was auctioned at Christie's in 2002, selling for $130,000.

== See also ==
- The Discovery of Moses, an 1886 painting by Edwin Long

== Bibliography ==
- Huckvale, David. Ancient Egypt in the Popular Imagination: Building a Fantasy in Film, Literature, Music and Art. McFarland, 2014.
