= Uncle Tom and Little Eva =

Uncle Tom and Little Eva may refer to:

- Uncle Tom and Little Eva (film), made in 1930
- Uncle Tom and Little Eva (painting), made in 1866
