= The Marriage Market (1923 film) =

1923 film

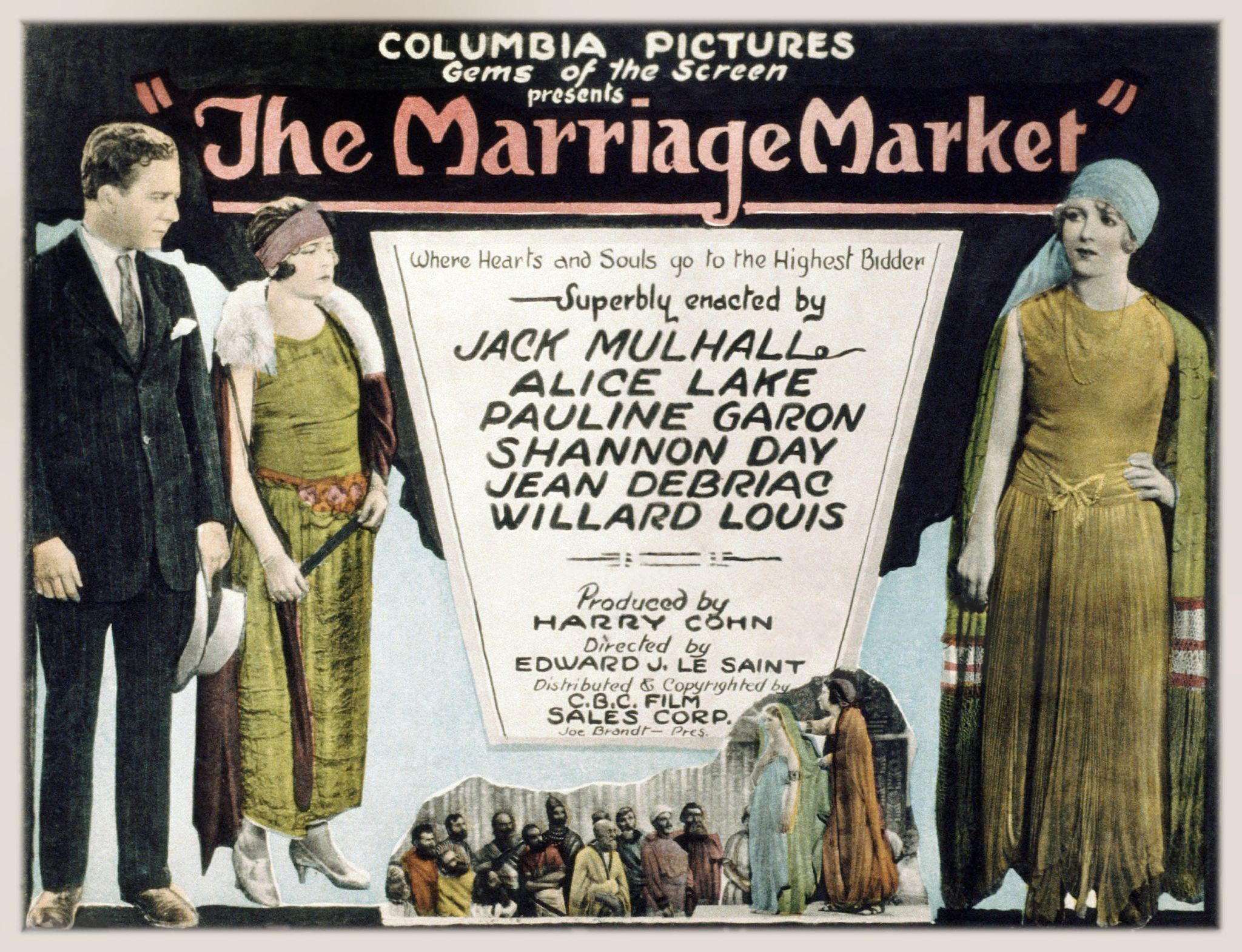
- Lobby card
- Directed by: Edward LeSaint
- Written by: Evelyn Campbell
- Produced by: Harry Cohn
- Starring: Pauline Garon; Jack Mulhall; Alice Lake
- Production company: CBC Film Sales Corporation
- Distributed by: CBC Film Sales Corporation
- Release date: October 25, 1923
- Running time: 58 minutes
- Country: United States
- Language: Silent (English intertitles)

The Marriage Market is a 1923 American silent romantic comedy film directed by Edward LeSaint and starring Pauline Garon, Jack Mulhall, and Alice Lake. The film was released by the CBC Film Sales Corporation, which would later become Columbia Pictures.

== Plot ==
As described in a film magazine review, mischievous pranks lead to the expulsion of Theodora Bland from a young woman's fashionable academy. She aids Dora Smith, who is escaping from a reform school, and later impersonates her in the home of novelist Roland Carruthers. The latter hides her from the Sheriff. Theodora's relatives endeavor to force her into an unwelcome marriage. After various adventures, she defeats their schemes and weds Roland.

== Cast ==
- Pauline Garon as Theodora Bland
- Jack Mulhall as Roland Carruthers
- Marc B. Robbins as John Piggott
- Vera Lewis as Aunt Agnes Piggott
- Alice Lake as Lillian Piggott
- Willard Louis as Seibert Peckham
- Kate Lester as Harriet T. Whitcomb
- Mayme Kelso as Miss Blodgett
- Shannon Day as Dora Smith, a Reform School Girl
- Jean De Briac as Count Dimitri

== Production ==
A historical sequence in the film reproduces the scene depicted in the 1875 painting The Babylonian Marriage Market by Edwin Long, which was also done in the Babylonian story of Intolerance (1916).

== Preservation and status ==
Complete copies are held at the UCLA Film & Television Archive and the National Archives of Canada.

== Bibliography ==
- Jeanine Basinger (2013). I Do and I Don't: A History of Marriage in the Movies. Knopf Doubleday Publishing Group. ISBN 978-0-307-26916-4
