= The Babylonian Marriage Market =

1875 painting by Edwin Long

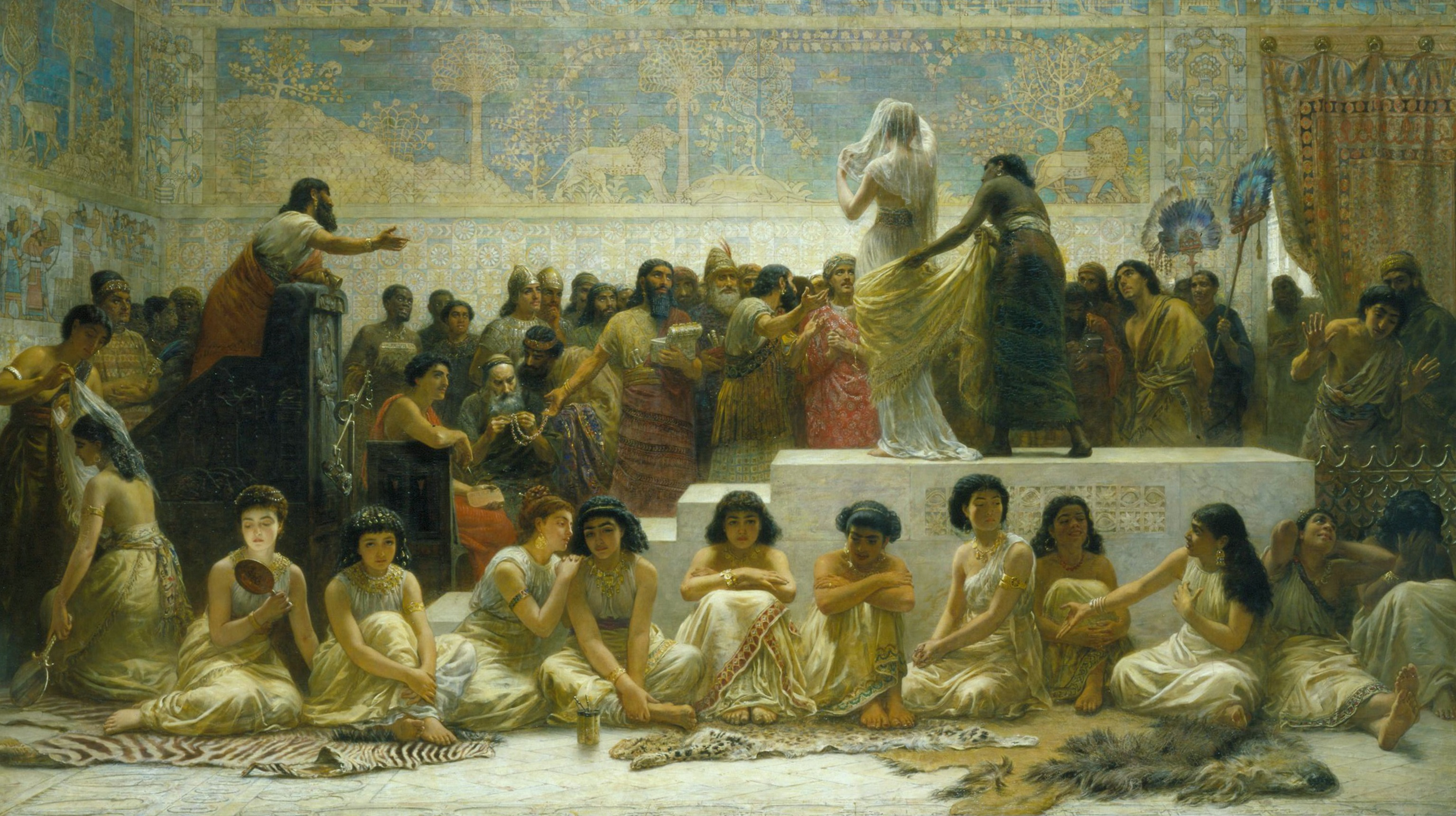
- Artist: Edwin Long
- Year: 1875
- Medium: Oil on Canvas
- Dimensions: 172.6 cm × 304.5 cm (68.0 in × 119.9 in)
- Location: Royal Holloway College, London

The Babylonian Marriage Market is an 1875 painting by the British painter Edwin Long. It depicts a scene from Herodotus' Histories of young women being auctioned into marriage in the area then known as Babylon or Assyria. It received attention for its provocative depiction of women. Long's use of historical detail to make the painting engaging yet relatable has been highly regarded. The work was purchased by Thomas Holloway in 1882 and is owned by Royal Holloway, University of London.

== Artist's background ==
Edwin Long was a portrait painter who was highly reclusive, shying away from public appearances and publicity. He is noted to have painted more large-scale paintings than any of his peers from the Royal Academy of Arts. Long was inspired by cultural artefacts, people and historical writings for his subject matter; the Histories of Herodotus inspired The Babylonian Marriage Market. His sketches of Spanish life during travels in Spain were received well by the art audience and academics of the time. This increased his public profile. The increased notability helped to establish Long within the English Royal Art Academy.

As his career and productivity increased, The Babylonian Marriage Market was shown at the Royal Academy, selling for 6,605 pounds, the largest price a modern painting had ever been sold at the time. This success as well as his persisting interest in Egyptian History led to further travels including Egypt in his later years. Long was selected as a Royal Academician in 1876 and 1881.

== Historical context ==
=== Women's movement ===
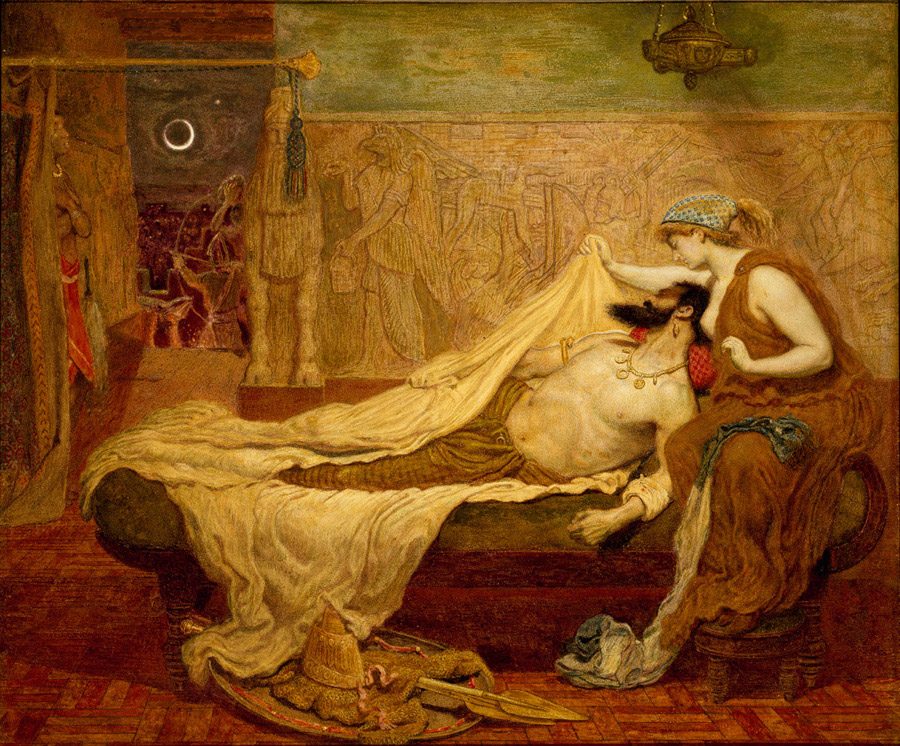
Ford Madox Brown's, The Dream of Sardanapalus, a contemporary example of Babylonian/Assyrian subject matter in painting

Edwin Long is thought to have conceived the painting in direct response to creation of the new laws centred around women's ownership and the ongoing women's suffrage movement. The Married Women's Property Act 1870 gave women the right to retain property even once they were married. This was regarded as significant as prior to the law property of a married woman would be immediately given to the husband. Holloway College notes that while this law was a significant improvement from the previous one, many women remained uncontented and demanded greater reform.

=== Audience exposure to Assyrian/Babylonian artefacts and artwork ===
Bohrer, a leading Art Historian and Archaeologist notes that The Babylonian Marriage Market was ground-breaking in Long's use of Western painting tradition and Eastern myth. The English artistic audience of the time had been exposed to Babylonian / Assyrian subject matter on a range of earlier occasions.

== The painting ==
=== Painting information ===
The Babylonian Marriage Market painting is 172.6 cm high and 304.6 cm wide. Oil on canvas is the medium used.

It is painted in a representative style, known as Realism. Realism was a popular form of painting in the Victorian era, that was received well by art audiences. The Victorian Art World, and English art academy considered realism to be a high art.

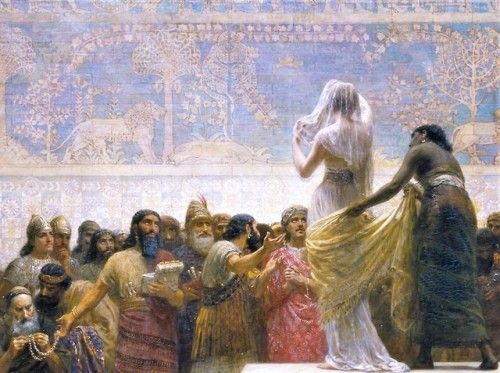
Detail from The Babylonian Marriage Market, showing the auctioning of the first bride. Her face is hidden to the painting's audience.

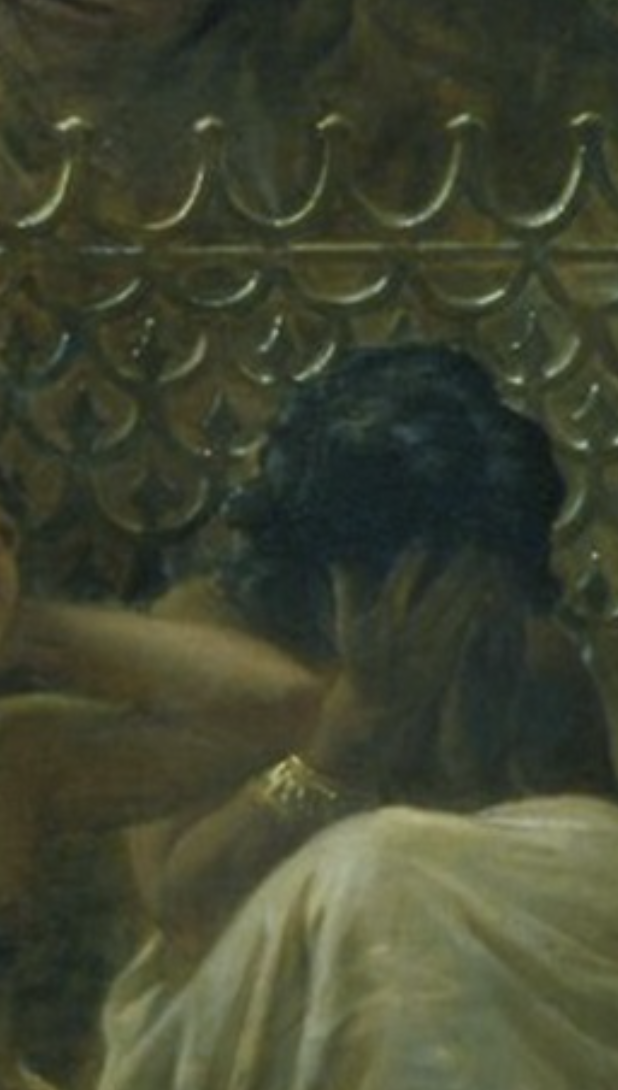
Detail from The Babylonian Marriage Market, the last bride covering her face.

=== Description ===
The foreground of the painting contains a line of Babylonian women who are seated and are facing the painting's audience. These women are brides waiting to be auctioned off on the white stone stepped pedestal featured in the middle ground of the painting. Upon this pedestal the first bride is currently being auctioned; she is displayed for purchase by another darker-skinned woman. To their left stands an auctioneer, presenting the woman to be sold. In the background of the image a crowd of men has gathered and is engaged in bidding on the women. The crowd features men that appear to come from different wealth levels and classes, and they are consumed by an array of different activities. Bohrer notes that the underlying event and subject of depiction is the alteration of women into commodity through the process of the market place sales system.

==== The setting ====
Bohrer posits that Long imagined and painted the place of sale to resemble a 19th century auction house. Bohrer argues that by doing this Long made the experience of viewing the painting more confronting for the present day Victorian viewer. Shireen Huda argues strongly for the idea that Long was intentionally depicting a contemporary auction house, most likely an auction space used by Christie's in London. Huda puts forth that Long had painted the famous auctioneer Thomas Woods as the auctioneer character within the work. The 1875 English art audience is argued by Bohrer to be familiar with the Babylonian/Assyrian setting. It is argued that Long conflates Babylon and Assyria, creating a hybrid eastern setting.

==== Composition ====
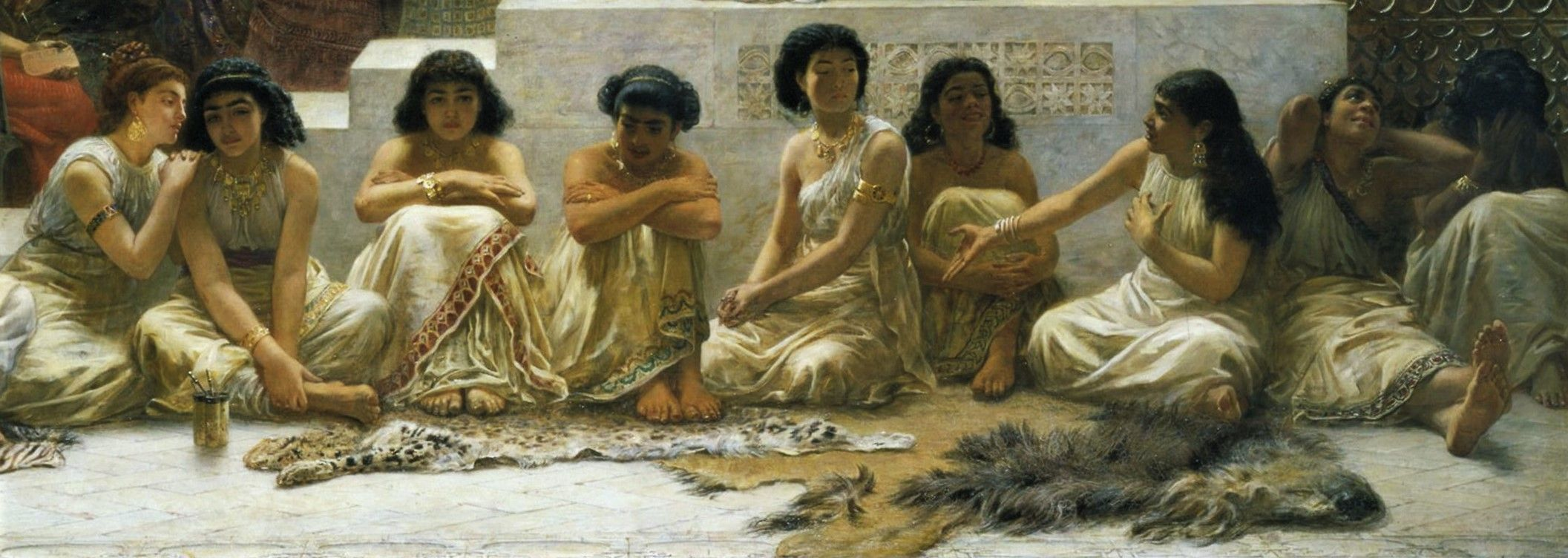
Detail highlighting the linear composition of the brides

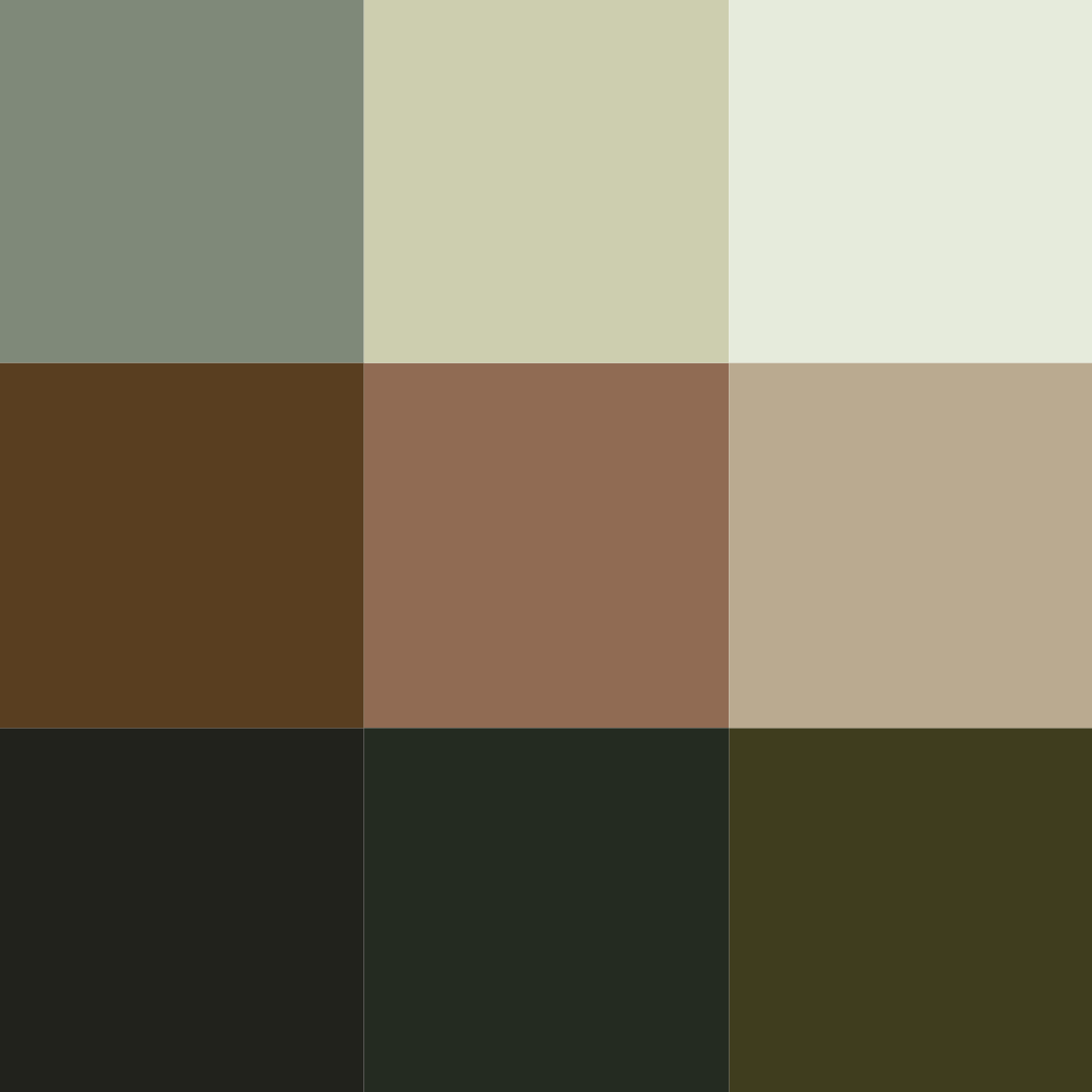
This colour palette highlights the core warm tones used in the painting

Long's inspiration for his choice of composition is unclear, as within the literature are housed competing and contrary opinions. The core topic of this disagreement is the divergence of Long's composition when compared with Rawlinson's translation of Herodotus, the academic standard of translation at the time of painting.

Imogen Hart points out that Herodotus describes the event taking place in the heart of a village, not an auction house, with the men of the village standing in a circle around the women, not a line. She further observes that Long's painting however, is set in a building reminiscent of a modern auction house, the men gathering in a line, not a circle. Bohrer attributes this divergence of Herodotus' translation to Long's own artistic freedom or reimagining of the fable, purposely abstracting the content of Herodotus to be more resonant with his 1875 audience. Hart attributes this divergence with Herodotus to Long's reading and favour for George Swayne's translation and commentary on Herodotus, which contains this linear arrangement and equal arrangement of the brides as depicted by Long. The Graphic notes Long's fondness for Swayne's commentary on Herodotus. It is argued that Long chose this method of composition because it better aligns the women (brides) with the decimal currency, with Hart arguing that the linear arrangement is more like a numerical scale that converts the brides to numerals. She posits that a core feature of the painting is Long's purposeful obscuring of the faces of the ugliest and most beautiful brides. By doing this Long is argued to address the philosophical problem of the difficulty or impossibility of assigning an objective worth to beauty. Long was understood to put forward that the most beautiful and ugly things are deeply subjective and personal. The additional choice to have the women seated at an equal level has been observed to establish an impactful linear equality, not hierarchy; Hart argues that this feature of the women's seating is key to understanding Long's critique of the Babylonian ritual. The first bride is facing away from the viewer in the detail, and in doing so the viewer is not able to see her face, but can see the linear equality of the bride's seating positions.

==== Ownership ====
The painting is currently held in the Picture Gallery of Royal Holloway, University of London,

== Reception ==
=== Display ===
The Babylonian Marriage Market was first displayed at the Royal Academy's annual exhibition in 1875. It was subsequently bought for Thomas Holloway, of the Royal Holloway University of London in 1882.

The painting made its public debut at the Royal Academy in 1875, where it drew large crowds and won widespread acclaim. The art critic John Ruskin praised the painting and highlighted the similarity between its subject matter and modern European marriage practices, which Ruskin thought were also mercenary and immoral. It is noted that audiences at the time had a taste for exotic eastern artefacts and narratives. The work was displayed in a gold painted frame. The frame was embossed with numeric Roman numeral script, each numeral encased in a circle which was positioned directly below each bridal figure in the painting. These numerals were thought to designate the rank of each of the brides.

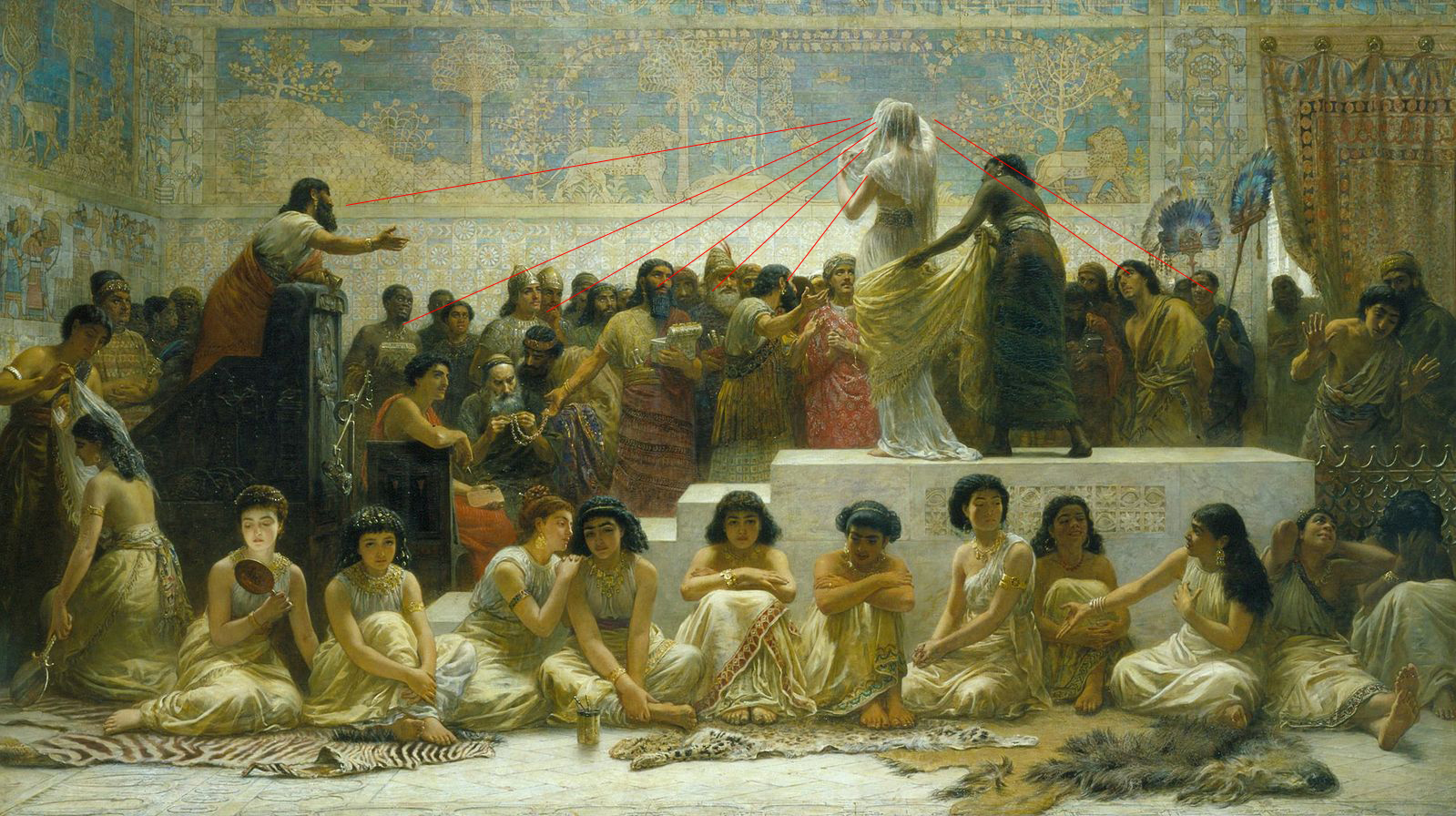
The Babylonian Marriage Market highlighting the Gaze

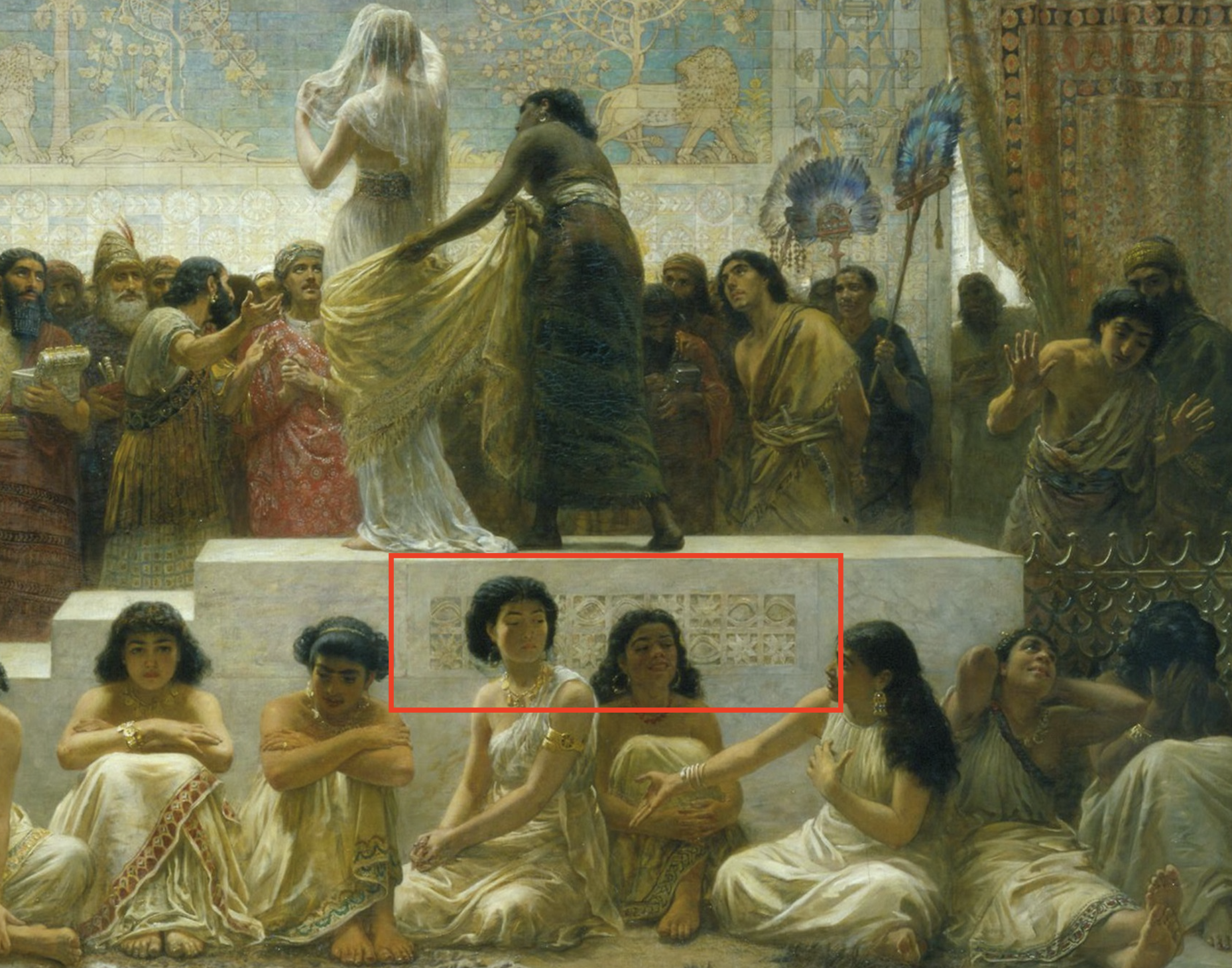
Highlight from The Babylonian Marriage Market of the decoration on the centre pedestal

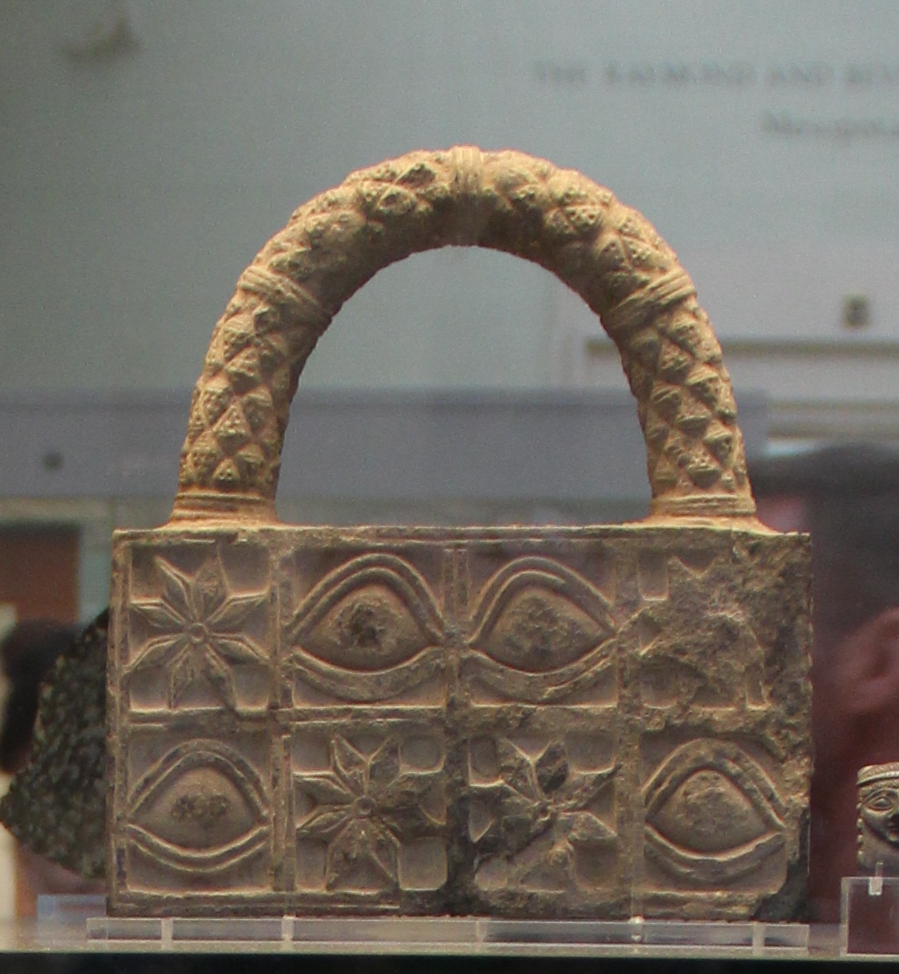
Carved stone with handle, the design of which was used for the decorative frieze of the central platform. British Museum.

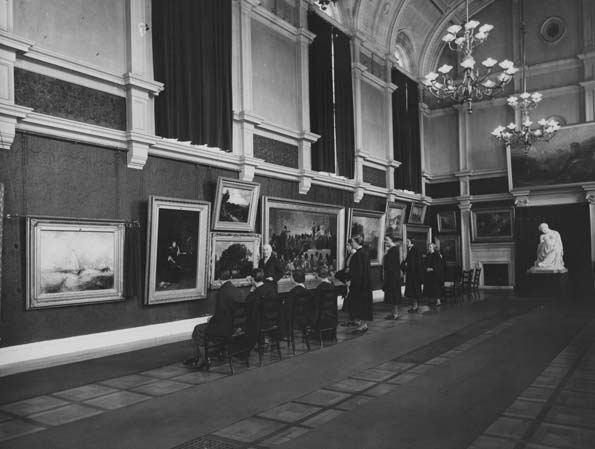
Viewing of The Babylonian Marriage Market within the Royal Holloway College in 1925

=== Ongoing legacy ===
The current owners of the painting, The Royal Holloway College, note how the painting became a symbol and discussion point for women's rights during the 1870s. The Babylonian Marriage Market was noted to resonate with the women of the 1870s, in light of the women's suffrage movement. The painting is still currently thought of a symbol which embodies this goal of gender equality. The silent film Intolerance (1916) includes a seven‐and‐a‐half‐minute scene closely based on this painting, and it is recreated in the historical sequence in The Marriage Market (1923).

=== Financial success ===
The Babylonian Marriage Market was thought to be well received from the financial perspective, selling for a then record breaking £6,605.

=== Reception of the work's narrative ===
Art critics of the period did not question Long's attention to archaeological detail and instead were primarily interested in the figures and narrative occurring within the setting. Art journalists at the time were noted to be absorbed in the ancient narrative. Media at the time of display applauded Long's placement of historical detail within the work. It has been noted that when the painting was originally displayed its meaning was ambiguous, without clearly signalling endorsement or disapproval at the Babylonian ritual. Bohrer points out that the painting struck a chord with the public, as its core topic is the transformation of women into an objective currency, amid the wider political changes with regards to women being able to possess land and currency of their own. Social theorist Sander Gilman puts forth that the painting is evident of how 19th-century European culture had internalised a conception of femininity and beauty that is distinctly racial. He argues that the fact that the women's arranged of beauty correlates distinctly with their racial features, from the most attractive who have fair skin and European features, while the least beautiful having darker skin and more pronounced features, is evidence of these internalised race judgements.

Media outlets at the time were aware that the work was not just a fable, but aimed to make an important comment on the status of women in the Victorian era. The painting was noted to acquire wider social notability, its commentary on the marriage process resonating with wider audiences. Satirical versions of the painting were created and distributed, for example an 1876 cartoon published in the Punch Pocket Book, which showed Mr Punch, a popular comic cartoon character of the time, auctioning for sale young women and other comic characters. Academics note that the work, through its political social critique, prompted greater political reform and discussion about women's rights to own property, goods and currency.

== Influences and inspiration ==
Long notes that he was enduringly inspired by the works of John Phillip, who was Long's personal teacher and mentor. A popular and well respected English painter who, like Long depicted many images of Spanish life. The painting was inspired by a passage in the Histories by Herodotus, and the artist copied some of the images from Assyrian artefacts in the British Museum. The composition is also influenced by Victorian painting auctions. The Graphic notes Long's enduring inspiration borne from myth and events from ancient History, especially those described by Herodotus. Bohrer notes how Long, either consciously or unconsciously, incorporates the theme of vision and the gaze in The Babylonian Marriage Market, themes which are distinctly explored in early western depictions of Babylonian Life, this theme is highlighted in an annotation of the work making clear this theme of the gaze.

Bohrer reports that artists practising at the time, such as Ford and Long, used Babylonian/Assyrian artefacts that were newly available to them not in order to recreate the strict Babylonian setting, but rather as imaginative inspiration. As the artists are noted to utilise the artefacts to embellish and create greater fictive detail in their imaginations of what Babylon could have been like. Bohrer's puts forward that the presence of the tiled nineteenth century styled floor, in The Dream of Sardanapalus (see above) is an example of this. Bohrer argues this as Ancient Assyrian/Babylonian architectural conventions and technology would have not allowed such a tiled floor to be designed or manufactured.

The painting incorporated several designs known from ancient artifacts. The motif of a carved stone with handle, probably of Elamite origin, and found in a foundation deposit of the Sumerian king A'annepada (circa 2500 BCE), was reused in the decoration of the white platform at the center of the painting.

== See also ==
- John Phillip
- Queen Esther (Work by Edwin Long)

== Sources ==
- "Art in May," Blackwood's Edinburgh Magazine 17 (1875):
- Bingham, Caroline. The History of Royal Holloway College 1886-1986. London: Constable, 1987.
- Bohrer, Frederick N. Inventing Assyria: Exoticism and Reception in Nineteenth-Century England and France, Vol. 80, No. 2 (1998): 336 - 256.
- Brown, Daniel. “Realist Con Artists.” In Representing Realists in Victorian Literature and Criticism, 167. Cham: Springer International Publishing, 2016.
- "Edwin Longsden Long". 2021. National Portraiture Gallery. https://www.npg.org.uk/collections/search/person/mp02788/edwin-longsden-long.
- Hart, Imogen. "The Politics of Possession: Edwin Long’s Babylonian Marriage Market.” Art History 35, no. 1 (2012): 87 – 95.
- Herodotus. Rawlinson, George. Gardner Wilkinson, John. and Creswicke Rawlinson, Henry. History of Herodotus New ed. London: John Murray, 1862.
- Huda Shireen. “The Major London Auction Houses.” In Pedigree and Panache, 19. ANU E Press, 2008. 19.
- "John Phillip". www.nationalgalleries.org. Retrieved 2021-05-27.
- Kertai, David. “Embellishing The Interior Spaces Of Assyria’s Royal Palaces: The Bēt Ḫilāni Reconsidered.” Iraq 79 (2017): 85 - 104.
- Knox, Giles. “Velázquez and Inversion: Making and Illusion,” in Sense Knowledge and the Challenge of Italian Renaissance Art: El Greco, Velázquez, Rembrandt. (Amsterdam University Press, 2019), 90.
- Lyndon Shanley, Mary. “Equal Rights and Spousal Friendship: The Married Women’s Property Act of 1870.” In Feminism, Marriage, and the Law in Victorian England, 1850-1895, (Princeton: Princeton University Press, 2021), 49 - 78.
- Marta García Morcillo; Pauline Hanesworth; Óscar Lapeña Marchena, eds. (2015). Imagining Ancient Cities in Film : from Babylon to Cinecittà. Routledge.
- "Royal Academicians | Royal Academy Of Arts | Council". 2021. Royalacademy.Org.Uk. https://www.royalacademy.org.uk/royal-academicians#council.
- Sander L Gilman. “Black Bodies, White Bodies: Toward an Iconography of Female Sexuality in Late Nineteenth-Century Art, Medicine, and Literature.” Critical Inquiry 12, no. 1 (1985): 204 – 242
- Speilman, M.H. “Painters in their Studios”, The Graphic, June 9, 1882.
- Swayne, George C. Herodotus. Edinburgh: W. Blackwood and Sons, 1870 "The Royal Academy Exhibition," Art-Journal n.s., 14, 187.
- Smits, T.P. “A. Korda, Printing and Painting the News in Victorian London: The Graphic and Social Realism, 1869–1891,” Farnham: Ashgate, 2015 9781472432988. Journal of European Periodical Studies 2 (2017): 56.
- Zainab Bahrani. “That Obscure Object of Desire: Nudity, Fetishism, and the Female Body.” In Women of Babylon, 82–107. Routledge, 2001.
- "Women's Suffrage Timeline." The British Library. Retrieved 2021-05-19.
