= Vashti (painting) =

1879 painting by Edwin Long

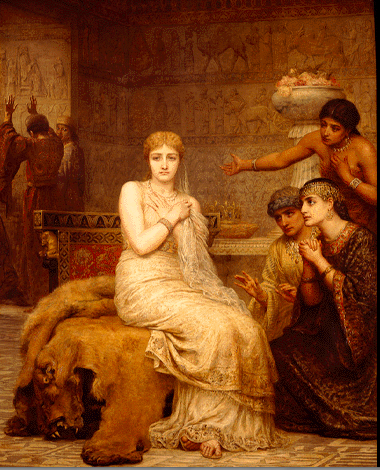
- Artist: Edwin Long
- Year: 1879
- Medium: Oil on canvas
- Dimensions: 380 cm × 470 cm (150 in × 190 in)
- Location: Museum and Gallery Bob Jones University, Greenville

Vashti is an oil painting on canvas by the English painter Edwin Long, from 1879. It depicts a character in the Book of Esther in the Hebrew Bible. Long was greatly influenced by the paintings of Velasquez and other Spanish masters, and his earlier pictures. It is housed in the Museum and Gallery at Bob Jones University, in Greenville.

== Description ==
The painting captures the dramatic opening of the biblical narrative of Vashti's refusal of the king's summons. Vashti was Queen of Persia and the first wife of the Persian king Ahasuerus in the Book of Esther. Ahasuerus ordered his chief eunuchs to carry out his command to bring Queen Vashti to stand before his courtiers and show off her exceptional beauty, but she was refused. She was banished for her refusal to appear at the king's banquet to show off her beauty as the king wished. She is viewed as an independent-minded heroine in feminism.
