= Anno Domini (painting) =

Painting by Edwin Long

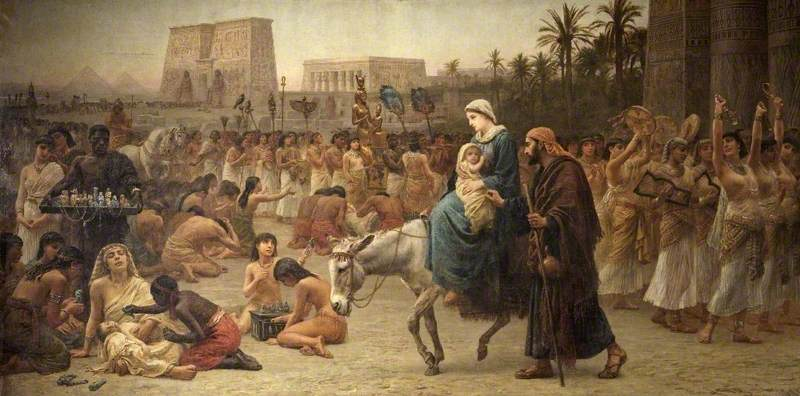
- Artist: Edwin Long
- Year: 1883
- Type: Oil on canvas, history painting
- Dimensions: 241.5 cm × 488 cm (95.1 in × 192 in)
- Location: Russell-Cotes Art Gallery, Bournemouth

Anno Domini is an oil painting on canvas by the British artist Edwin Long, from 1883. It is held at the Russell-Cotes Art Gallery, in Bournemouth.

== History and description ==
A biblical history painting, it features a depiction of episode of the Flight into Egypt, when Joseph, Mary and the infant Jesus, fled to Egypt to escape the Massacre of the Innocents, ordered by Herod of Judea. The large painting shows the Holy Family passing an Egyptian religious procession, sharply contrasting the Judeo-Christian tradition with that of the paganism of Ancient Egypt. The large procession extends from the right and was made to honour their gods. Palm trees and ancient Egyptian buildings can be seen in the background. Joseph and Mary ignore the idols on sale of Egyptian Gods.

Long was noted for his Orientalist scenes in the Academic Style. Rather than display it at the Royal Academy or the rival Grosvenor Gallery, Long exhibited it as a standalone attraction at the Lawrence Gallery in Bond Street, where it drew very large crowds.

It was acquired by the art collector Merton Russell-Cotes. It is now in the Russell-Cotes Art Gallery & Museum, in Bournemouth, having been formally left to the collection in 1921.

== Bibliography ==
- Bills, Mark (ed . Edwin Longsden Long, RA. Cygnus Arts, 1998.
- Hubrich, Ann-Kathrin & Bracker, Jacobus (ed.) The Art of Reception. Cambridge Scholars Publisher, 2021.
- O'Kane, Martin. Borders, Boundaries and the Bible. Sheffield Academic Press, 2002.
