= The Chosen Five =

Painting by Edwin Long

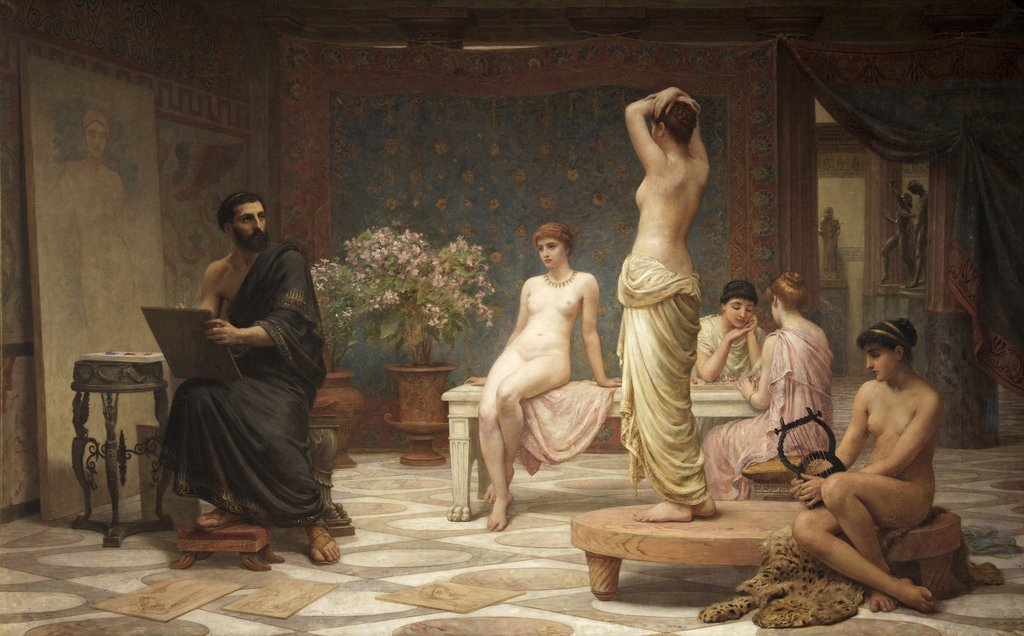
- Artist: Edwin Long
- Year: 1885
- Type: Oil on canvas, history painting
- Dimensions: 149 cm × 240 cm (59 in × 94 in)
- Location: Russell-Cotes Art Gallery, Bournemouth

The Chosen Five is an oil on canvas history painting by the English artist Edwin Long, from 1885. It is held at the Russel-Cotes Art Gallery, in Bournemouth.

== History and description ==
It depicts a scene from Ancient Greece. The celebrated artist Zeuxis, working on a painting of Helen of Troy, has selected five beautiful young woman from Crotone so that he can use a composite of them to create the ideal depiction. The five models now pose in his studio. It was produced with a companion piece, The Search for Beauty, depicting Zeuxis searching for the most beautiful woman to feature in the work.

The two paintings were exhibited at the French Gallery in London's Bond Street in 1885. The Chosen Five was acquired by the art collector Merton Russell-Cotes. It was donated to the Russel-Cotes Art Gallery, in Bournemouth in 1921.

The subject had previously been depicted by the French Neoclassical painter François-André Vincent in his 1789 work Zeuxis Choosing the Most Beautiful Women from Croton as His Models.

== Bibliography ==
- Marvin, Miranda. The Language of the Muses: The Dialogue Between Roman and Greek Sculpture. Getty Publications, 2008.
- Smith, Alison. The Victorian Nude: Sexuality, Morality and Art. Manchester University Press, 1996.
