= The Moorish Proselytes of Archbishop Ximenes, Granada, 1500 =

Painting by Edwin Long

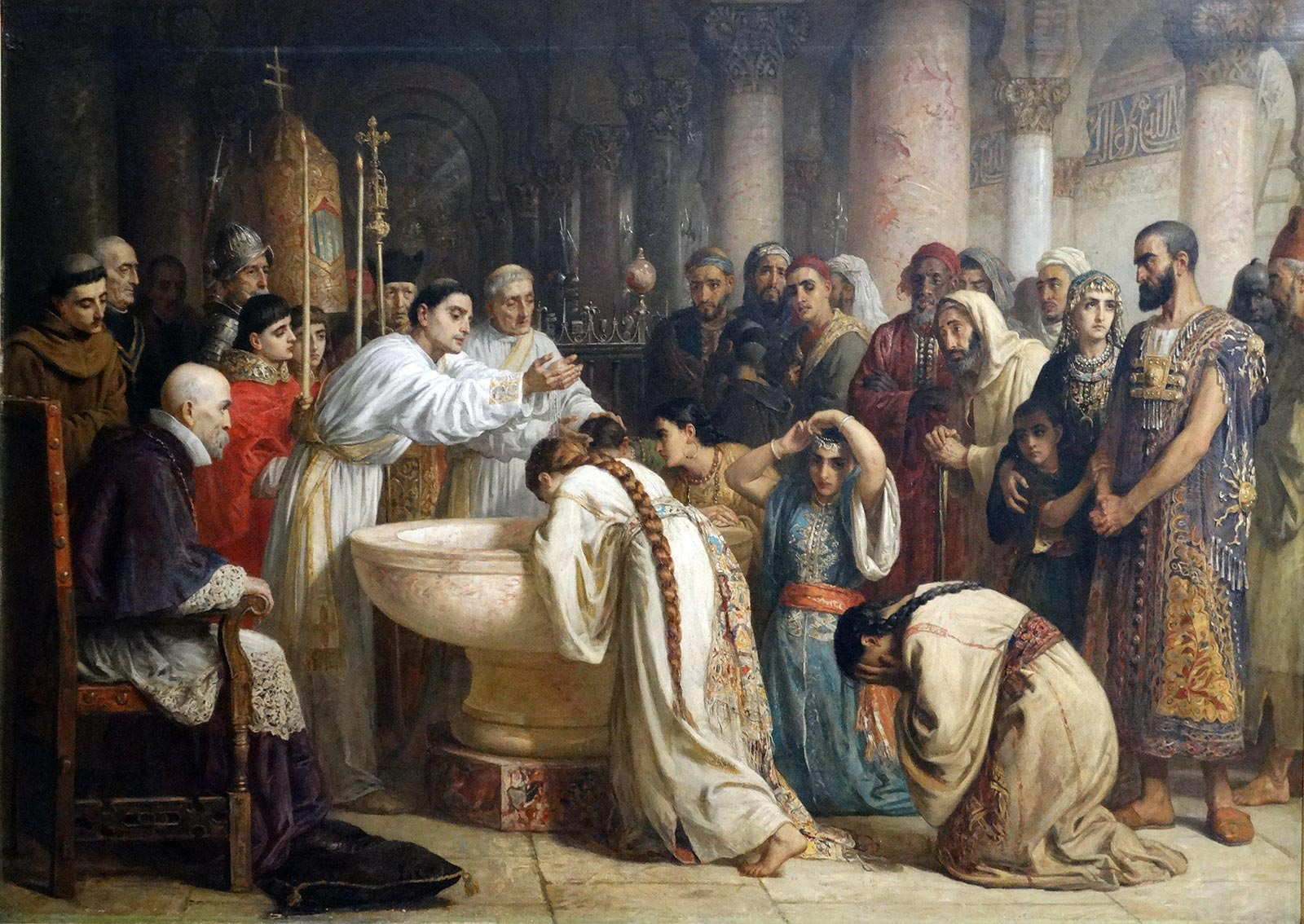
- Artist: Edwin Long
- Year: 1873
- Type: Oil on canvas, history painting
- Dimensions: 186.5 cm × 273 cm (73.4 in × 107 in)
- Location: Russell-Cotes Art Gallery, Bournemouth

The Moorish Proselytes of Archbishop Ximenes, Granada, 1500, is an oil on canvas history painting by the British artist Edwin Long, from 1873.

== History and description ==
Following the Reconquista, Moorish converts to Catholicism line up to be baptised. This was as the behest of the zealous Francisco Jiménez de Cisneros, who had overturned the previous grant of religious tolerance to the Muslim inhabitants of the former Emirate of Granada following its defeat in 1492. He is shown seated on the left as a stream of hesitant converts queue up.

Long was noted for his Orientalist paintings, but his earlier works reflected the influence of John Phillip and were often Spanish-themed. This was one of the last paintings set in Spain, a recurring motif in his art since 1857.

The painting was displayed at the Royal Academy Exhibition of 1873 held at Burlington House in London. Today the picture is in the Russell-Cotes Art Gallery in Bournemouth, having been acquired in 1873 to complement the pictures purchased by the art collector Merton Russell-Cotes, an admirer of the work of Long who purchased several of his works.

== Bibliography ==
- Anderson, James M. Daily Life During the Spanish Inquisition. ABC-CLIO, 2002.
- Bills, Mark. Art in the Age of Queen Victoria: A Wealth of Depictions. Russell-Cotes Art Gallery and Museum, 2001.
- Hammerschlag, Keren Rosa. The Chosen Race: Troubling Whiteness in Victorian Painting. University of California Press, 2026.
