= An Egyptian Feast =

Painting by Edwin Long

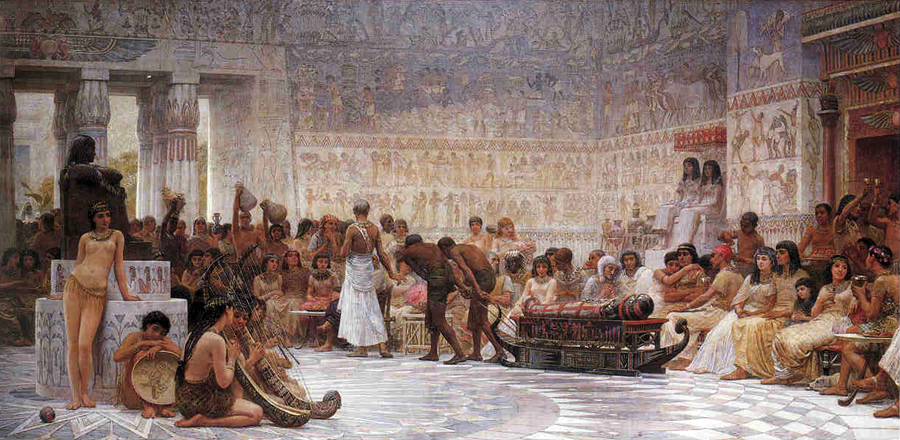
- Artist: Edwin Long
- Year: 1877
- Type: Oil on canvas, history painting
- Dimensions: 87.8 cm × 187.7 cm (34.6 in × 73.9 in)
- Location: Cartwright Hall Art Gallery, Bradford

An Egyptian Feast is an oil on canvas history painting by the British artist Edwin Long, from 1877.

== History ==
Long was well-known for such Orientalist works. The painting was displayed at the Royal Academy Exhibition of 1877 held at Burlington House in London, where it was popular with audiences and critics and was described as the "sensation picture of the year" by the magazine John Bull. Today it is at the Cartwright Hall Art Gallery, in Bradford, which acquired it in 1931.

== Bibliography ==
- Huckvale, David. Ancient Egypt in the Popular Imagination: Building a Fantasy in Film, Literature, Music and Art. McFarland, 2014.
