= The Discovery of Moses =

Painting by Edwin Long

- Artist: Edwin Long
- Year: 1886
- Type: Oil on canvas, history painting
- Dimensions: 196.7 cm × 276.8 cm (77.4 in × 109.0 in)
- Location: City Museum and Art Gallery, Bristol

The Discovery of Moses is an oil on canvas history painting by the English artist Edwin Long, from 1886. It is also known as Pharaoh's Daughter. It is held in the City Museum and Art Gallery, in Bristol.

== History and description ==
It depicts the Old Testament scene of the Finding of Moses, a popular subject in art from the Renaissance onwards. The infant Moses is discovered in a basket by the Pharaoh's daughter and her handmaidens, while they are bathing in the River Nile. The scene exudes a great sense of sensuality and exoticism.

It was displayed at the Royal Academy's Summer Exhibition of 1886 at Burlington House in London. The work was a stylistic inspiration for the film director Cecil B. DeMille's epic silent film The Ten Commandments. Today the painting is in the Bristol Museum & Art Gallery, having been acquired in 1908.

== See also ==
- The Finding of Moses, an 1885 painting by Frederick Goodall

== Bibliography ==
- Huckvale, David. Ancient Egypt in the Popular Imagination: Building a Fantasy in Film, Literature, Music and Art. McFarland, 2014.
- Moser, Stephanie. Painting Antiquity: Ancient Egypt in the Art of Lawrence Alma-Tadema, Edward Poynter and Edwin Long. Oxford University Press, 2020.
