= Uncle Tom and Little Eva (painting) =

British painting

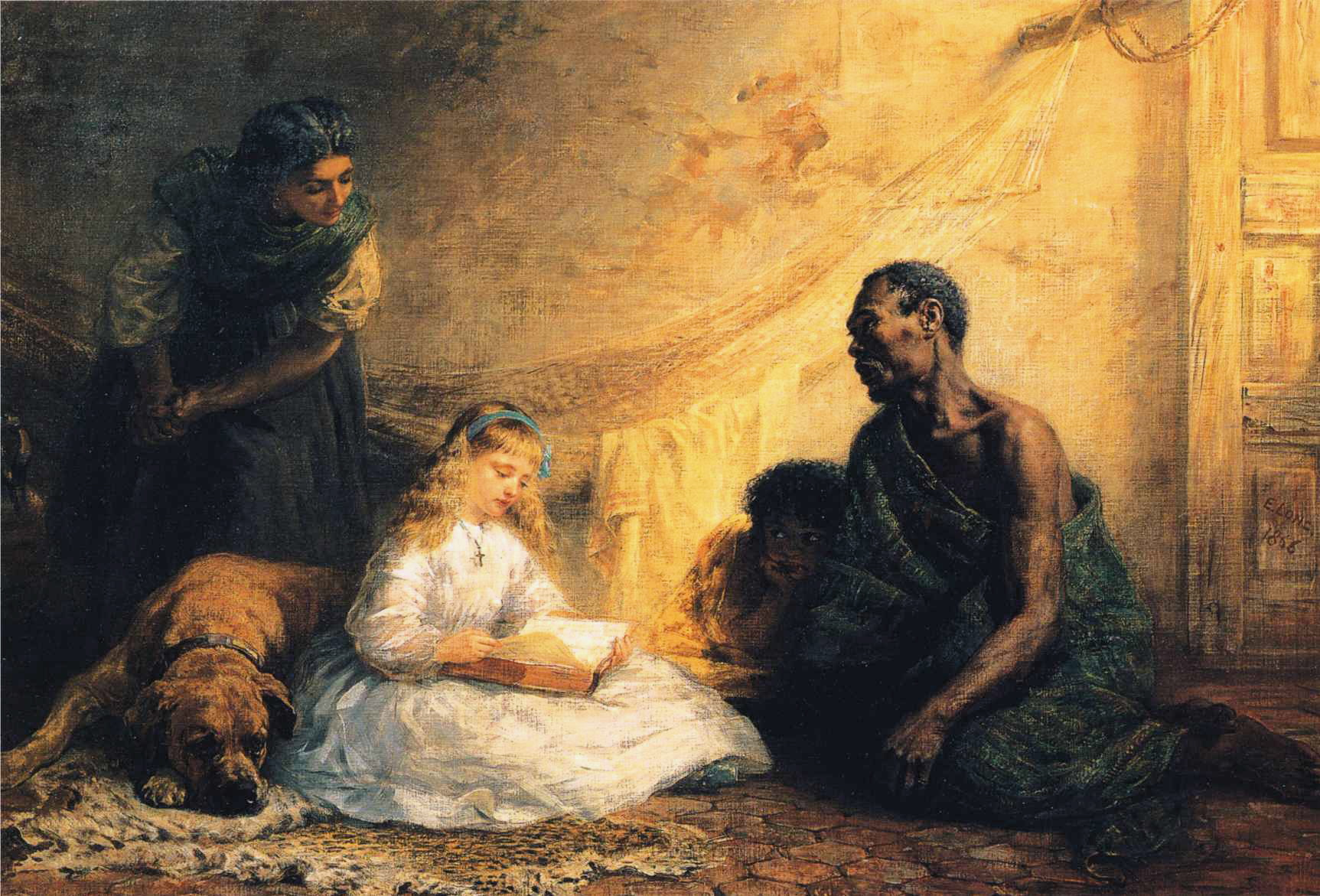
- Artist: Edwin Longsden Long
- Year: 1866
- Location: Russell-Cotes Art Gallery & Museum, Bournemouth; 50.7176°N 1.8707°W

Uncle Tom and Little Eva is an oil on canvas painted by Edwin Long in 1866. It depicts a scene from the novel Uncle Tom's Cabin. Tom is seen, seated at the right, watching at Eva, dressed in white, an angelical child, while she is reading her book. Poorly dressed Tom has a black child by his side, while a faithful dog lies beside Eva. The painting is kept at Russell-Cotes Art Gallery & Museum, in Bournemouth.
