= Queen Esther (painting) =

Painting by Edwin Long

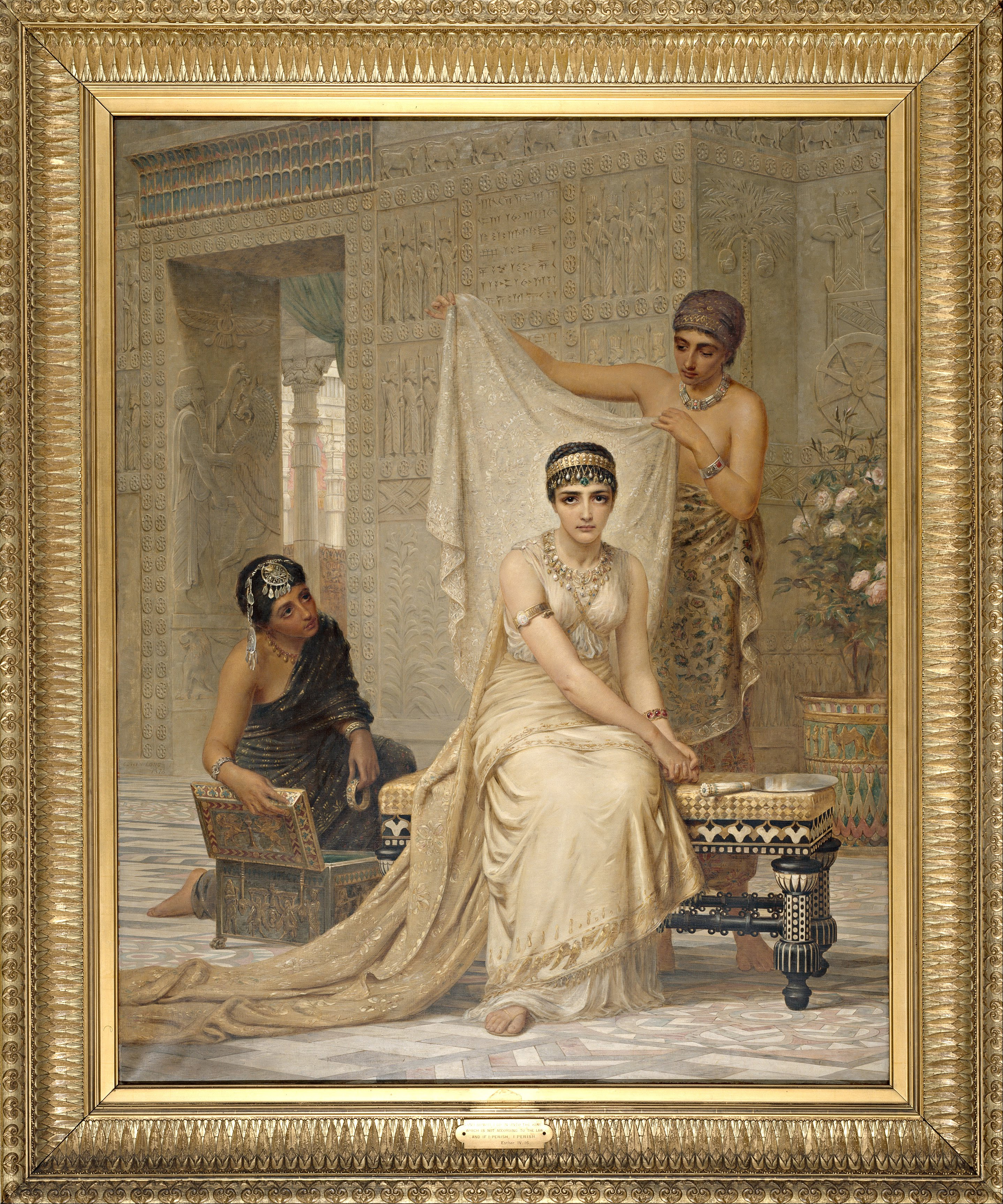
- Artist: Edwin Long
- Year: 1878
- Type: Oil on canvas, history painting
- Dimensions: 170.3 cm × 213.5 cm (67.0 in × 84.1 in)
- Location: National Gallery of Victoria, Melbourne

Queen Esther is an oil on canvas painting by English artist Edwin Long, from 1878. It is held at the National Gallery of Victoria, in Melbourne.

== History and description ==
The painting depicts Queen Esther, the Jewish wife of the Persian King Ahasuerus, moments before she enters his presence uninvited – an act that could have led to her death. She did so at the urging of her cousin Mordecai, after it was discovered that Haman the Agagite, the king’s advisor, was plotting to exterminate all the Jews in the kingdom. In the end, Esther was able to reverse the decree and save her people.

The painter seems to have tried as much possible achieve historical accuracy with this work. He drew upon travelogue illustrations in the British Museum in order to produce this vision of the biblical Queen Esther in Ahasuerus' palace at Susa.

The painting was first displayed in 1878 at the Royal Academy, and is now a part of the collection Pérez Simón.

The painting was meant to be hung next to a similar painting depicting Vashti. It was housed in the Museum and Gallery at Bob Jones University for a time and is currently held at the National Gallery of Victoria, in Melbourne.
