= Edwin Long =

British painter (1829–1891)

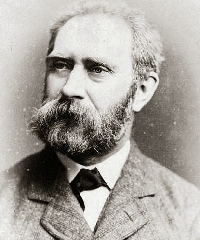
- Born: Edwin Longsden Long; 12 July 1829; Bath, Somersetshire, England
- Died: 15 May 1891 (aged 61); Hampstead, England
- Education: James Mathews Leigh, London
- Known for: Painter
- Movement: Orientalist

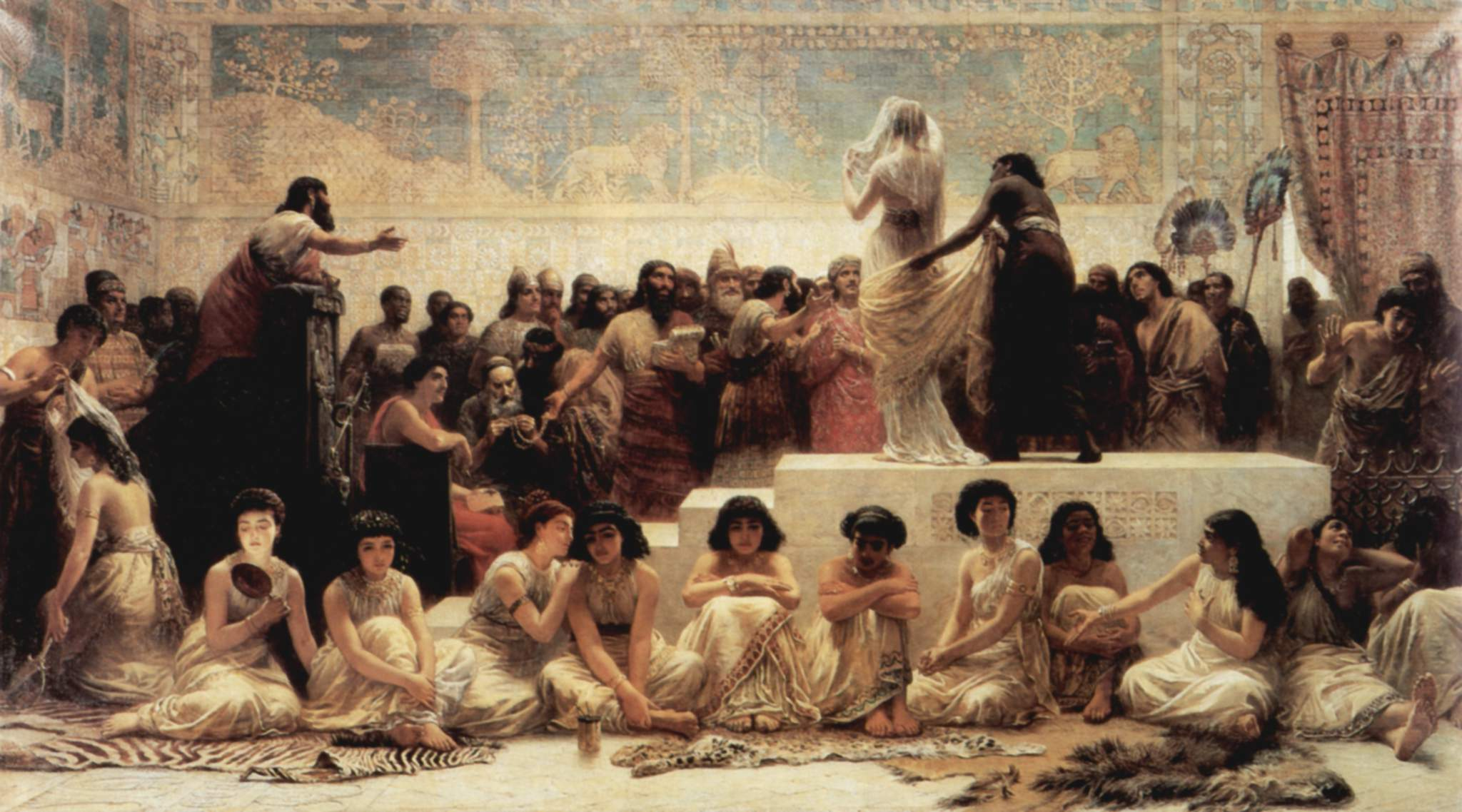
The Babylonian Marriage Market (1875)

Edwin Longsden Long RA (16 July 1829 - 15 May 1891) was a successful English genre, history, biblical and portrait painter. He is best known for his Orientalist paintings, many very large, which fetched high prices. His The Babylonian Marriage Market (1875, over three metres wide) is perhaps his best known work in this line.

By 1883, he was able to establish his own selling gallery in Old Bond Street.

== Life and works ==
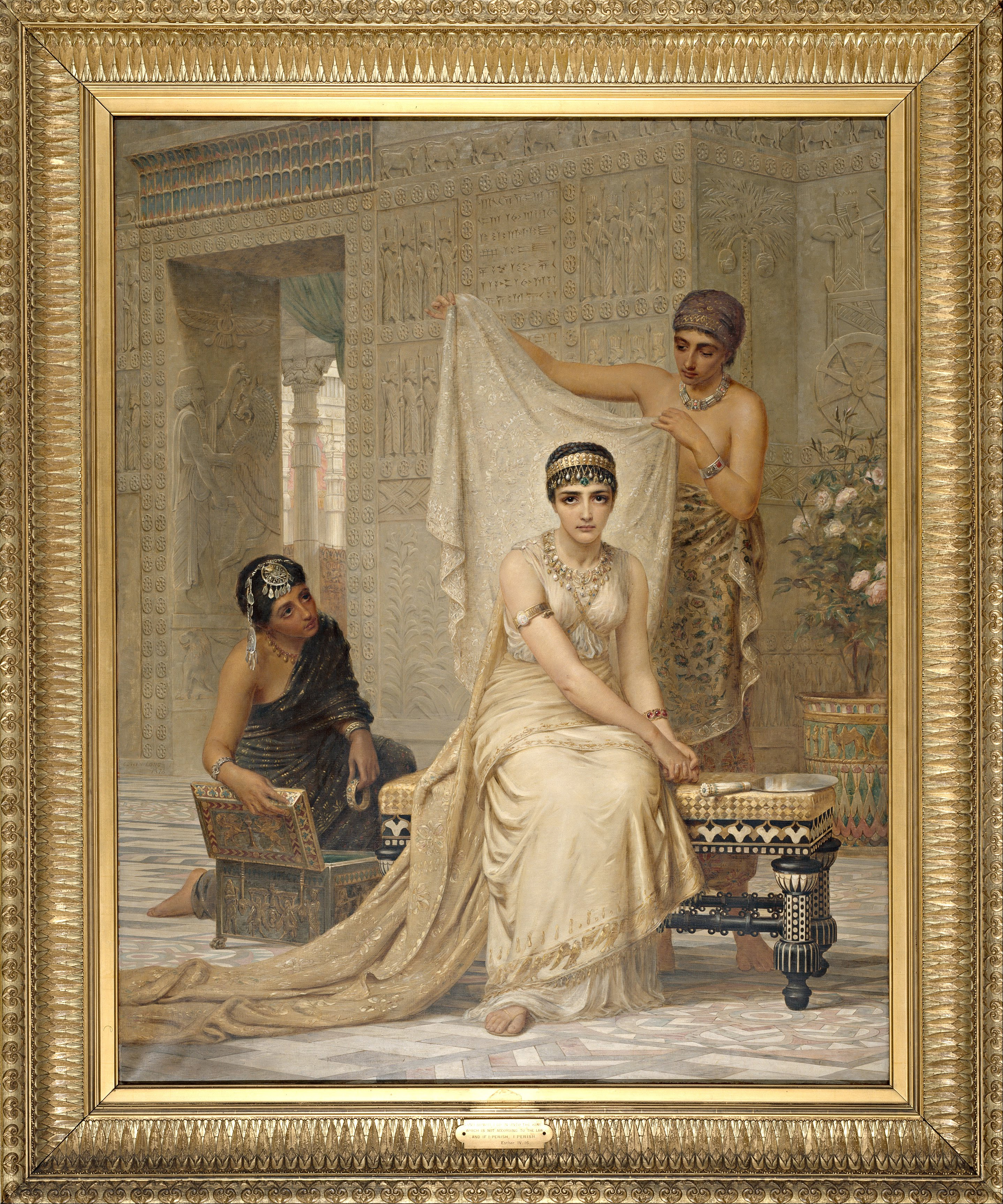
Queen Esther (1878)

Long was born in Bath, Somerset, the son of James Long, a hairdresser, (from Kelston in Somerset), and was educated at Dr. Viner's School in Bath. Adopting the profession of a painter, Long came to London and studied in the British Museum. He was subsequently a pupil in the school of James Mathews Leigh in Newman Street London, and practised first as a portrait artist painting Charles Greville, Lord Ebury and others.

Long made the acquaintance of John Phillip RA, and accompanied him to Spain, and Egypt where they spent much time. Long was greatly influenced by the paintings of Velasquez and other Spanish masters, and his earlier pictures, such as La Posada (1864) and Lazarilla and the Blind Beggar (1870), were painted under Spanish influence. His first important pictures were The Suppliants (1872) and The Babylonian Marriage Market (1875), both subsequently purchased by Thomas Holloway. In 1874, he visited Egypt and Syria, and subsequently his work took a new direction. He became thoroughly imbued with middle-eastern archaeology and painted oriental scenes including The Egyptian Feast (1877), The Gods and Their Makers (1878).

Long was elected an associate of the Royal Academy in 1870 and an academician (RA) in 1881. His pictures always attracted attention and his Diana or Christ? (1881) greatly enhanced his reputation at the time. His pictures suited the taste and appealed to the religious sentiment of a large portion of the public, and their popularity was increased by a wide circulation of engravings. He consequently determined to exhibit his next pictures in a separate gallery of his own in Bond Street, London and there in 1883, and the following years, his Anno Domini and Zeuxis at Crotona met with great commercial success.

Long died from pneumonia resulting from influenza, at his home, "Kelston" in Netherhall Gardens, Hampstead, on 15 May 1891, in his sixty-second year. He was buried in Hampstead Cemetery. The will signed by him on the day of his death was the subject of a lawsuit, to which his relatives were parties, but the matter in dispute was amicably settled.

Long married a daughter of Dr. William Aiton, Margaret, by whom he left a family, of whom a son, Maurice St Clair Long, was killed in a railway accident at Burgos in Spain on 23 September 1891. They had two children, Maurice and Ethel G.

Besides the Edwin Long Gallery in Old Bond Street, a number of his pictures were collected together after his death, and formed the nucleus of a gallery of Christian Art which replaced the works of Gustave Doré in the well-known gallery in New Bond Street. Long had considerable practice as a portrait painter but his success in that line was not conspicuous, although he obtained high patronage and very large prices. He painted for the Baroness Burdett Coutts (his chief patron) portraits of herself, her friend Mrs. Brown, and Henry Irving. Among other portraits of his latter years were a memorial portrait of the Earl of Iddesleigh, of which he painted a replica for the National Portrait Gallery, portraits of Cardinal Manning (perhaps his best effort in this line), Samuel Cousins, Sir Edmund Henderson and others. According to art historian Lionel Cust, "In his earlier works Long showed great power and thoroughly deserved his success and popularity", but added that his later works "suffered from a continual repetition of types which resulted in monotony".

== Paintings ==
- Begging for the Monastery (1867)
- The Suppliants (1864)
- Uncle Tom and Little Eva (1866)
- A Spanish Flower Seller (1867)
- The Gamekeeper (1869)
- "Usted Gusta" (1870)
- A Question of Propriety (1870)
- A Street Scene in Spain (1871)
- The Approval (1873)
- The Moorish Proselytes of Archbishop Ximines (1873)
- Primero Segundo y Basso Profondo (1873)
- The Babylonian Marriage Market (1875)
- In the Tent (1876)
- A Dorcas Meeting in the 6th Century (1873–1877)
- An Egyptian Feast (1877)
- The Gods and Their Makers (1878)
- Queen Esther (1878)
- Vashti Refuses the King's Summons (1879)
- The Eastern Favourite (1880)
- To Her Listening Ear Responsive Chords of Music Came Familiar (1881)
- Diana or Christ? (1881)
- Anno Domini (1883)
- Glauke: Pensive (1883)
- The Chosen Five (1885)
- Eastern Lily (1885)
- Jepthah's Vow: the Martyr (1885)
- Love's Labour Lost (1885)
- The Discovery of Moses (1886)
- Alethe Attendant of the Sacred Ibis in the Temple of Isis (1888)
- Sacred to Pasht (1888)
- Preparing For The Festival Of Anubis (1889)
- Thisbe (1884)
- Little Eva and Uncle Tom (1886)

== Gallery ==
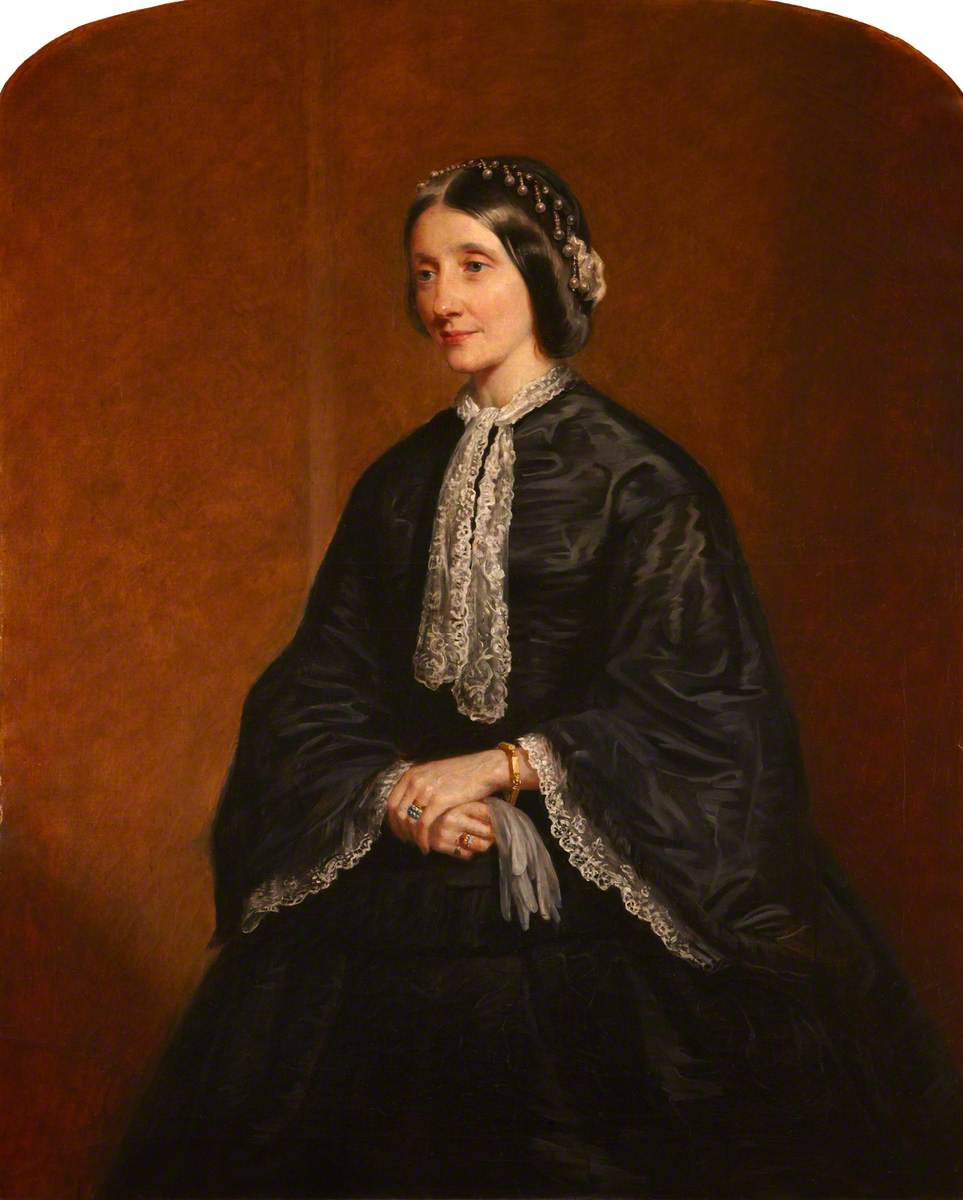
The Hon. Harriet Margaret Maxwell, Viscountess Bangor (1805-1880), 1850

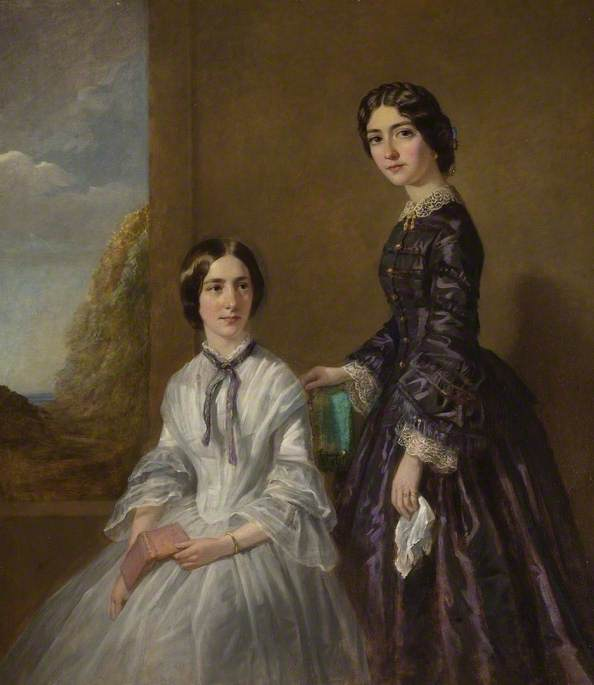
The Cousins, 1856

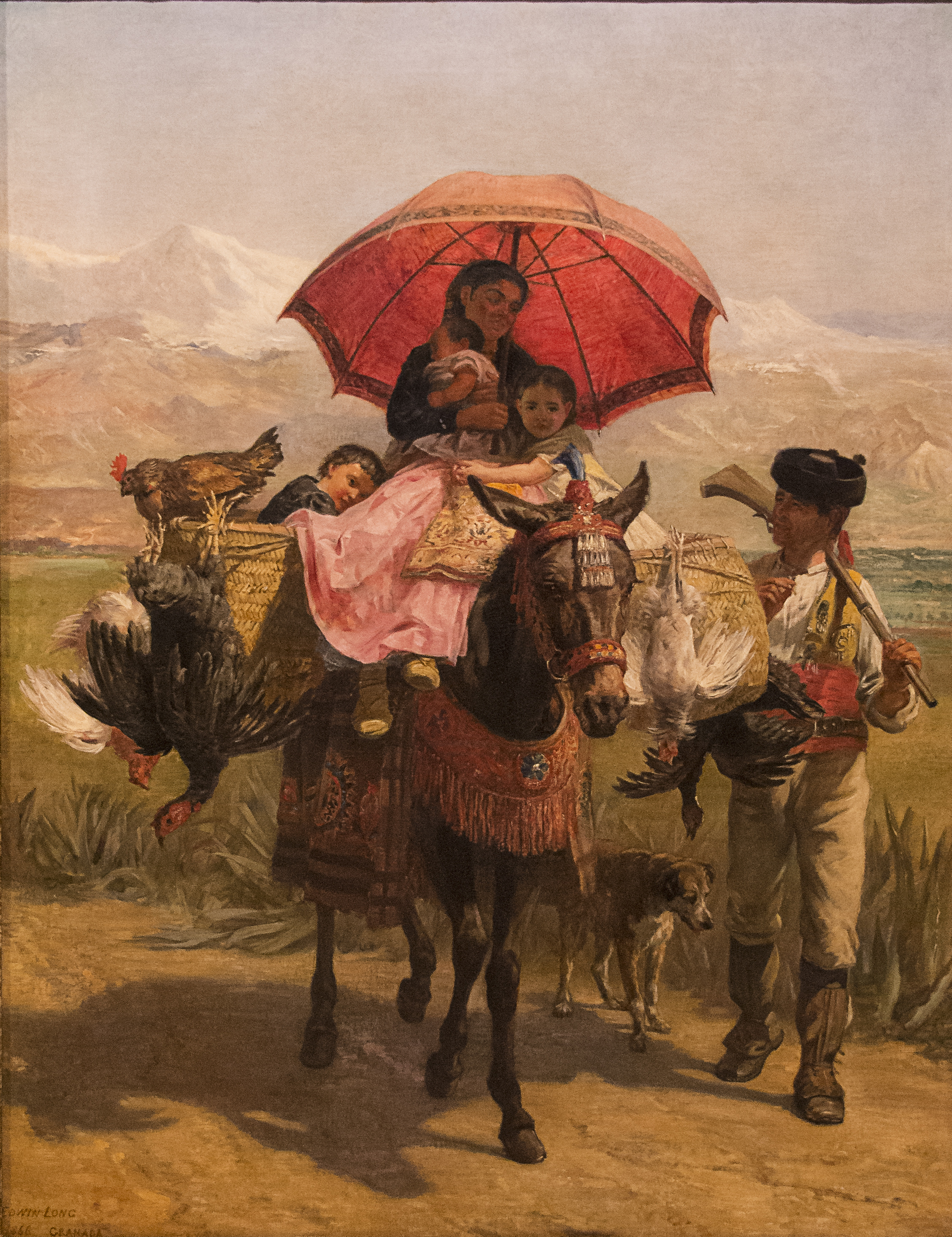
On the Road, Granada, 1866

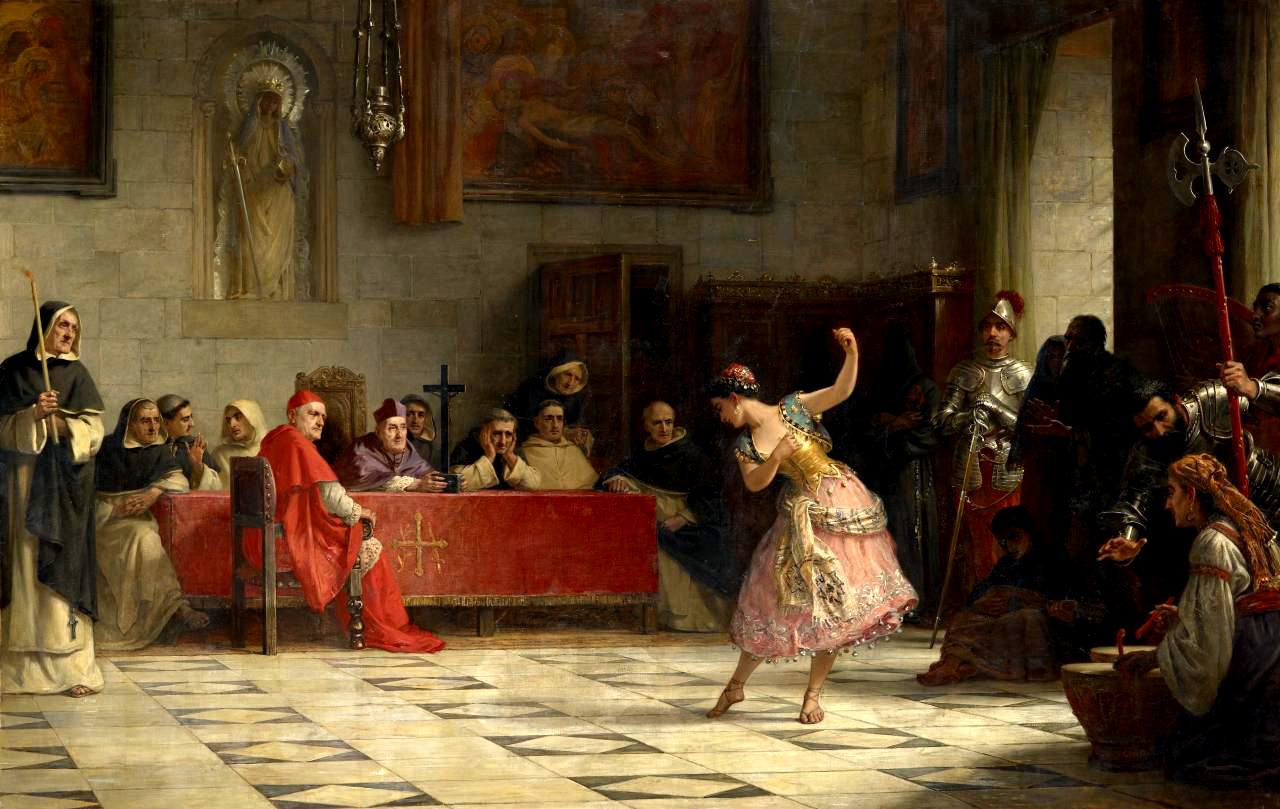
A Question of Propriety 1870

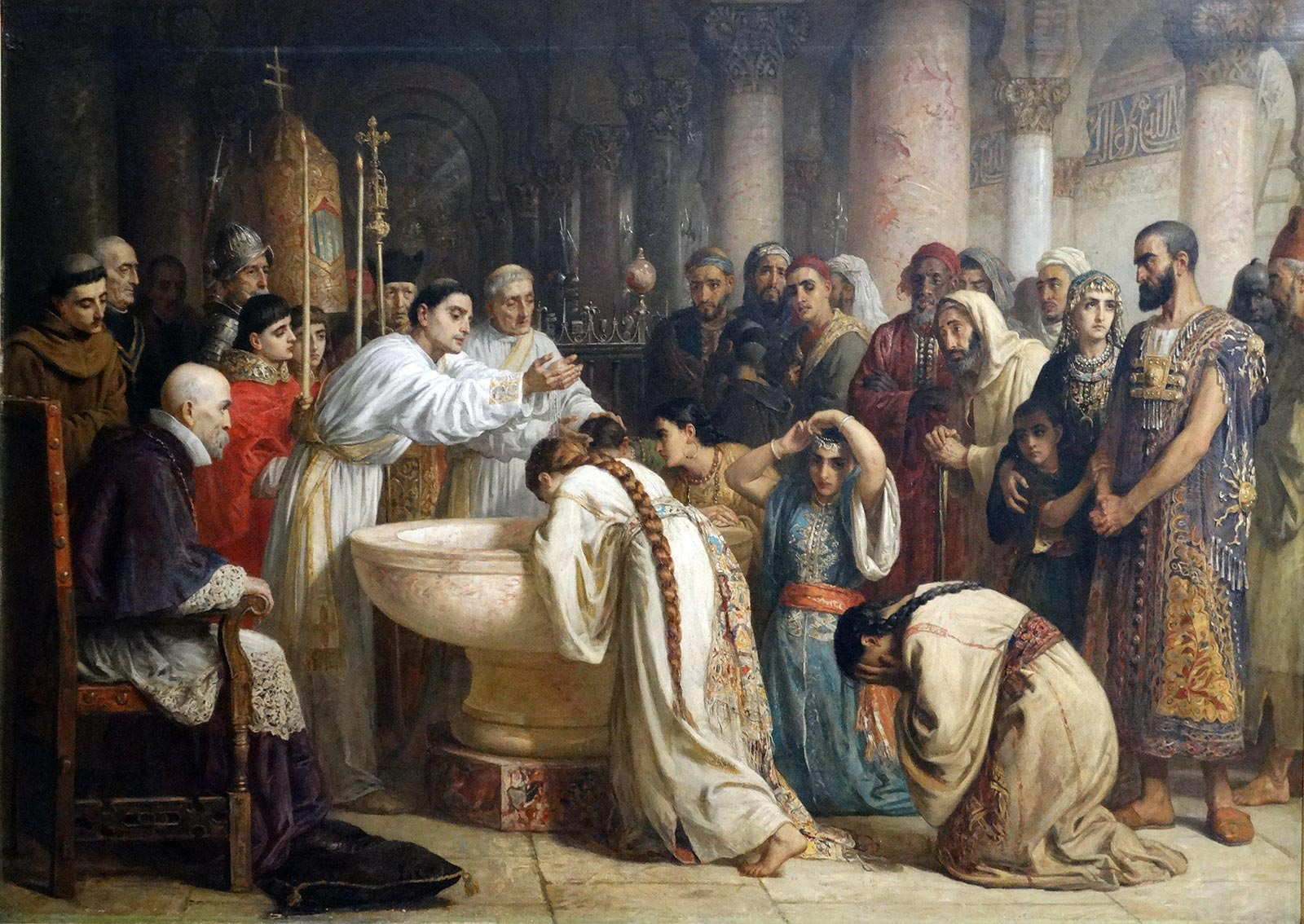
The Moorish Proselytes of Archbishop Ximenes, 1873

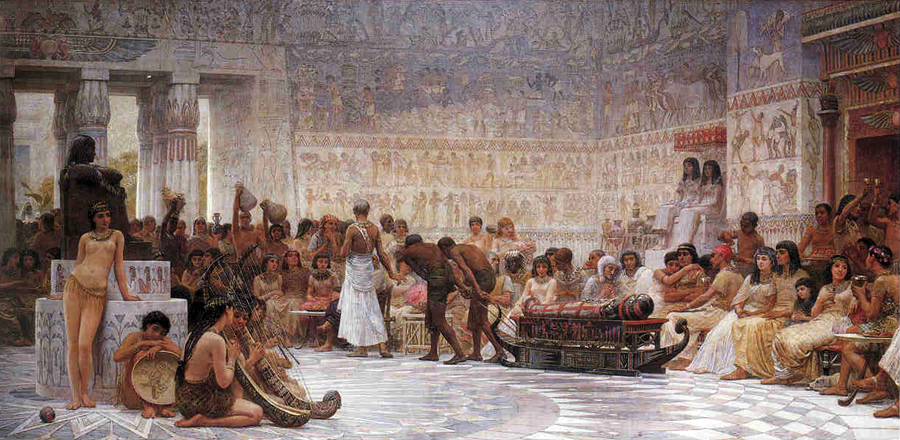
An Egyptian Feast, 1877

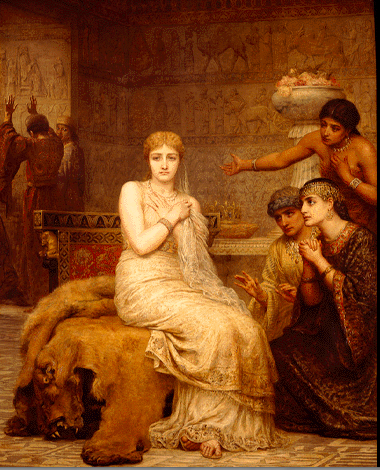
Vashti, 1879

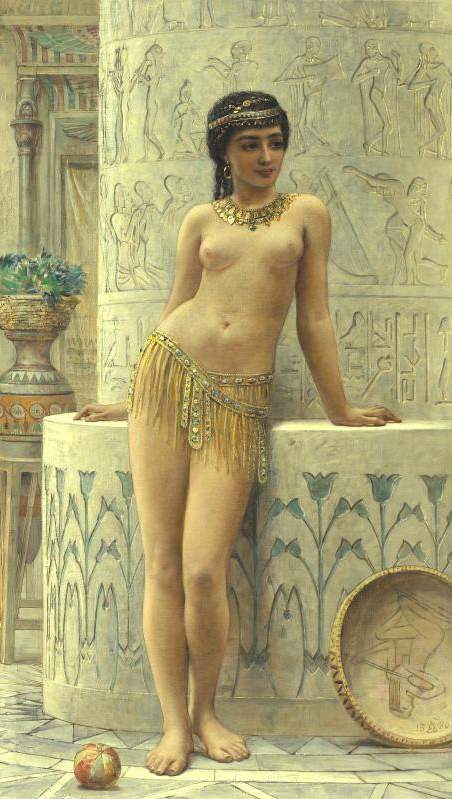
The Eastern Favorite, 1880

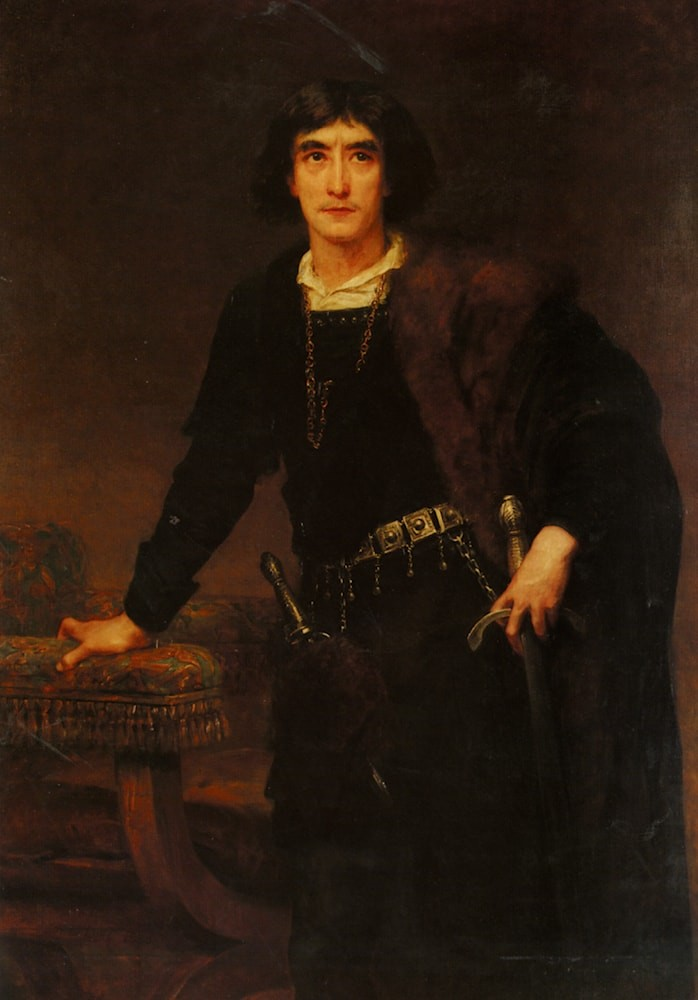
Henry Irving as Hamlet, 1880

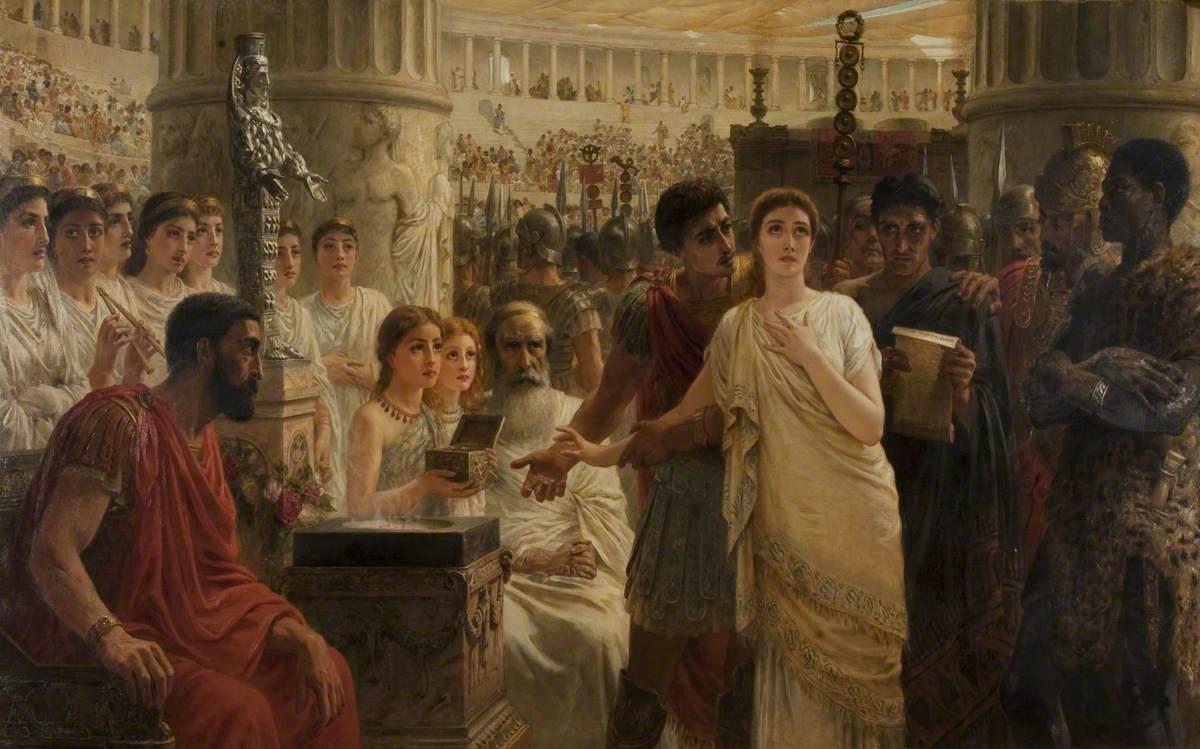
Diana or Christ?, 1881

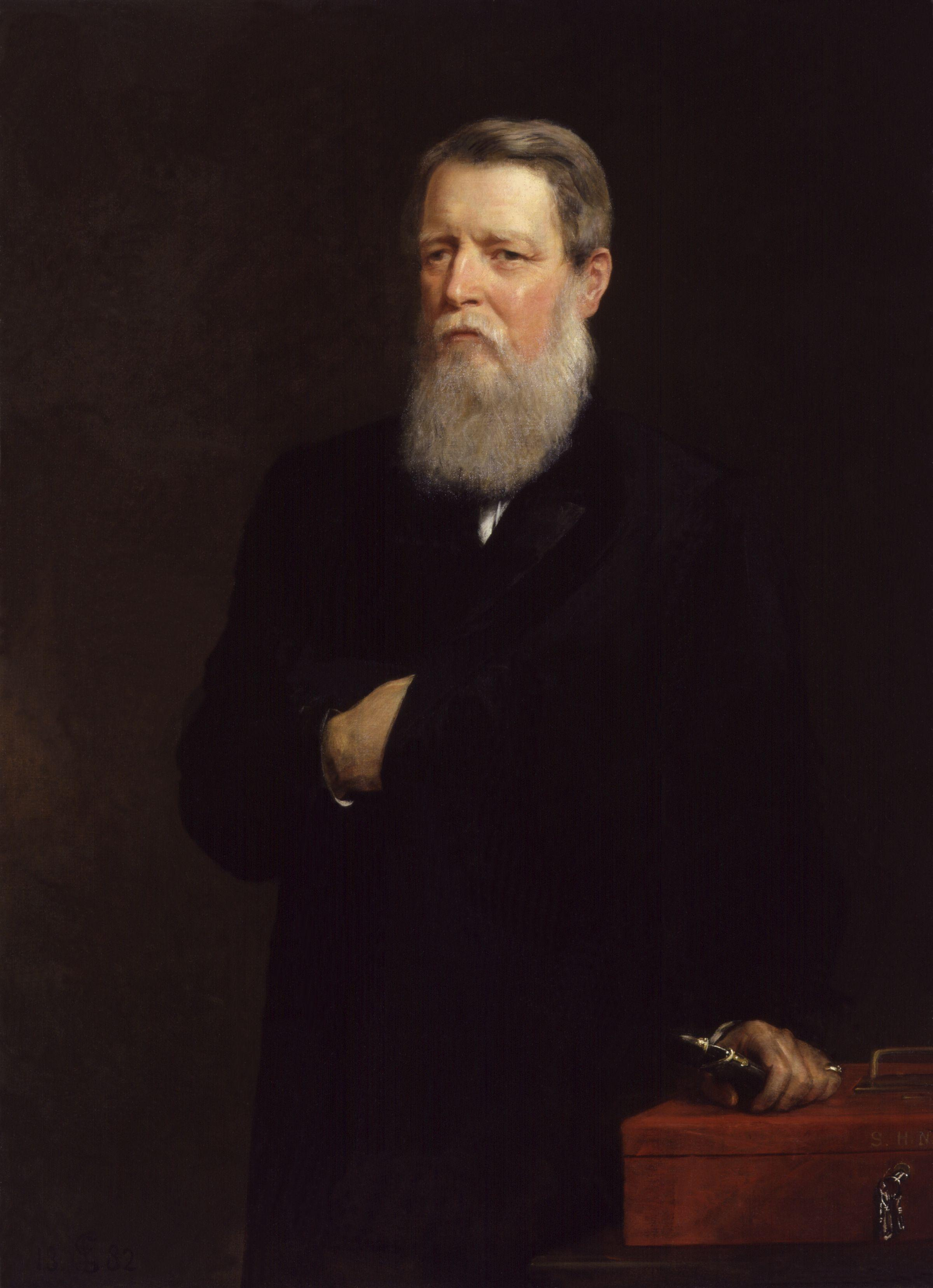
Portrait of Stafford Northcote, 1882

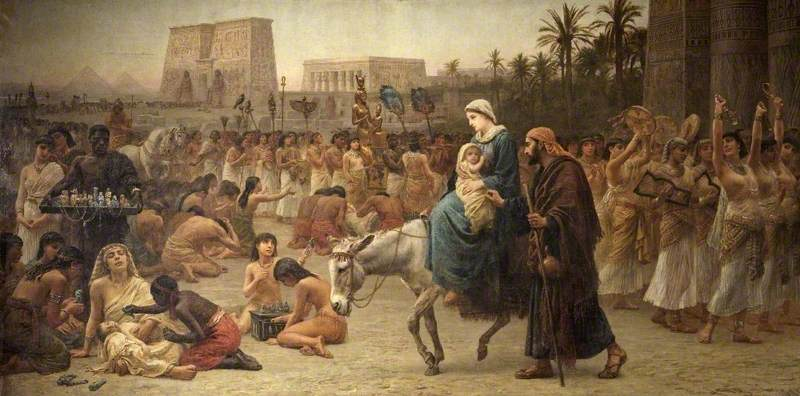
Anno Domini, 1883

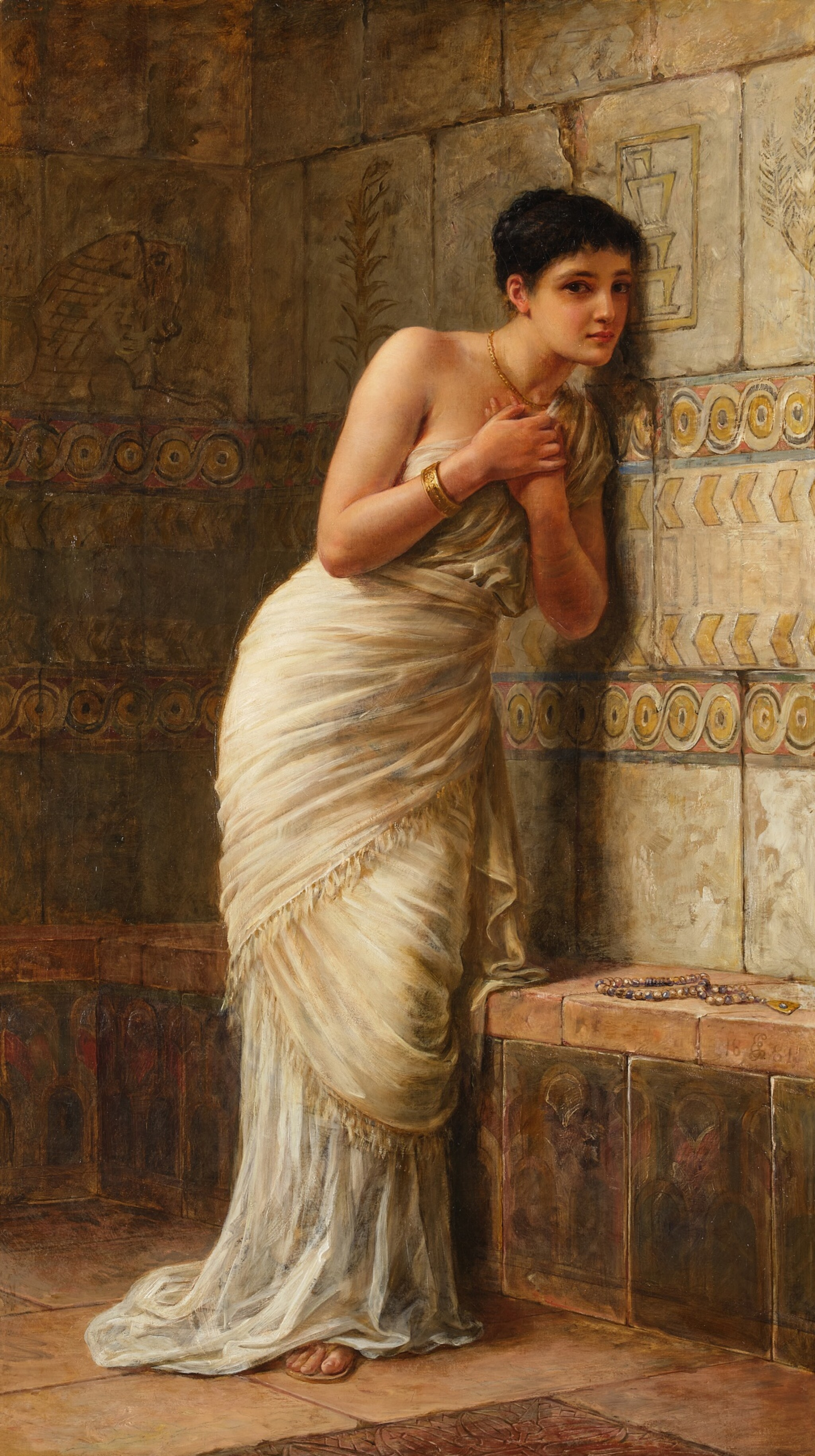
Thisbe, 1884

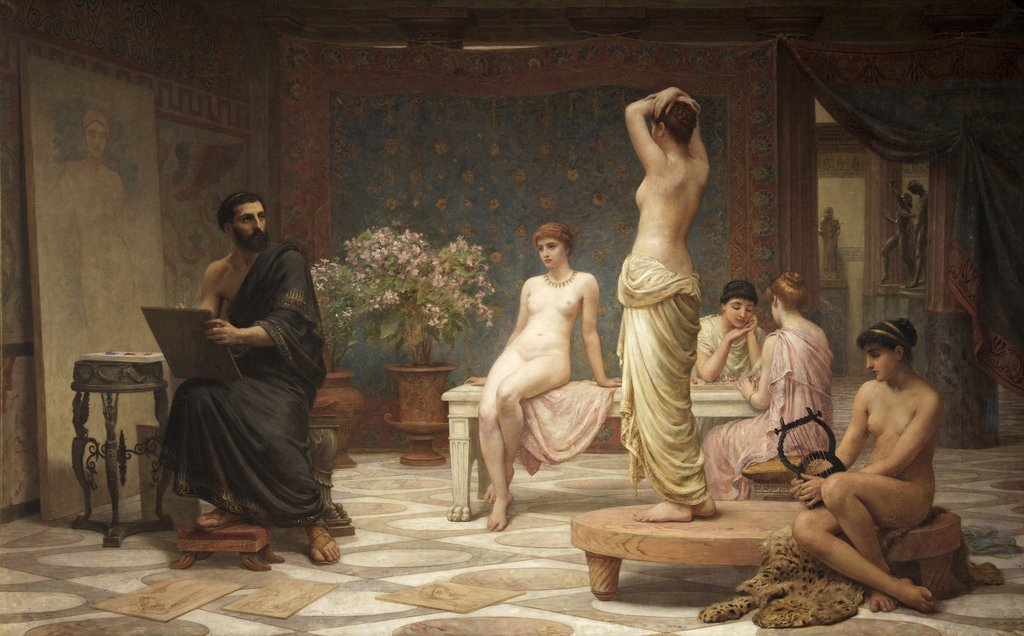
The Chosen Five, 1885

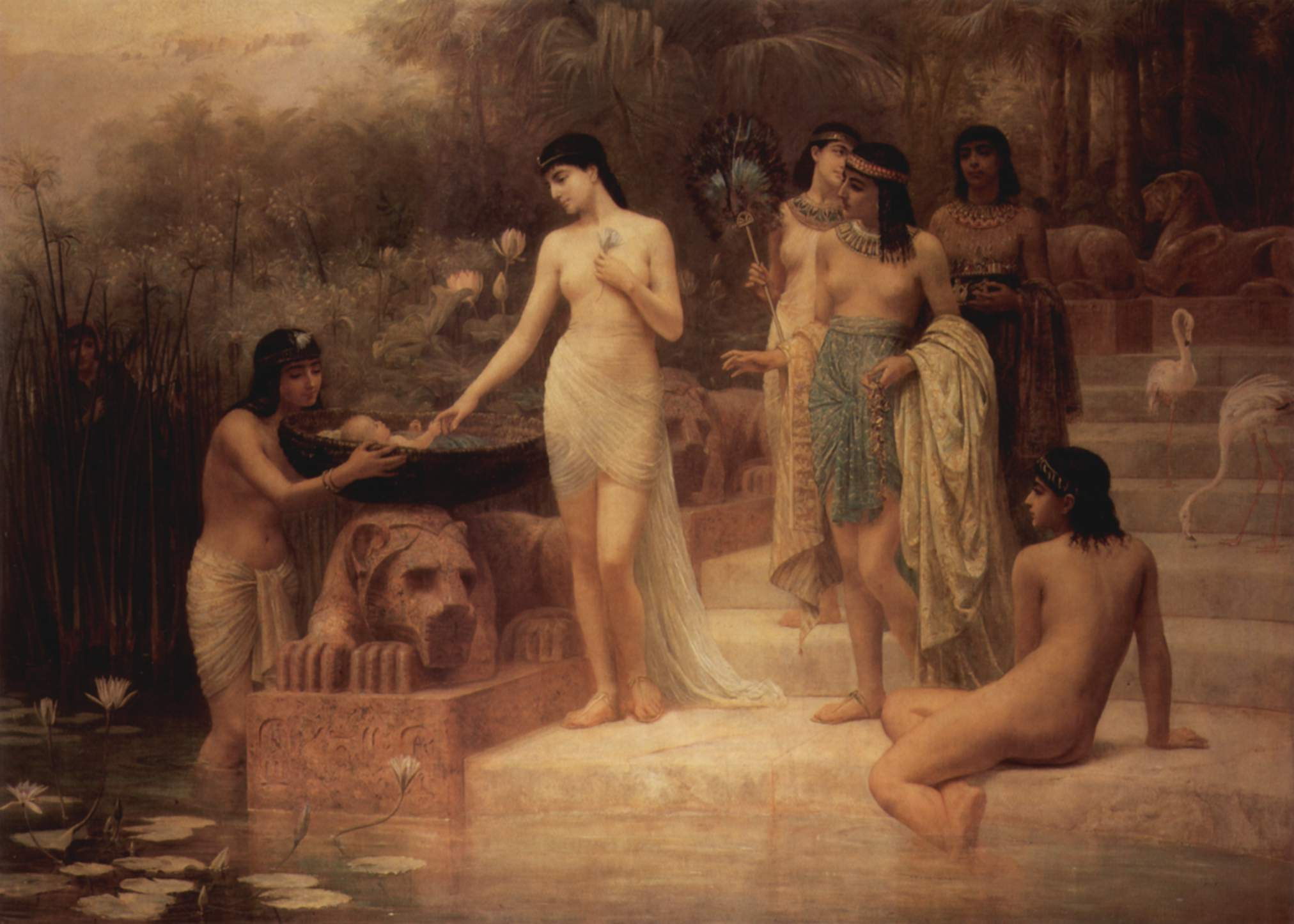
The Discovery of Moses 1886

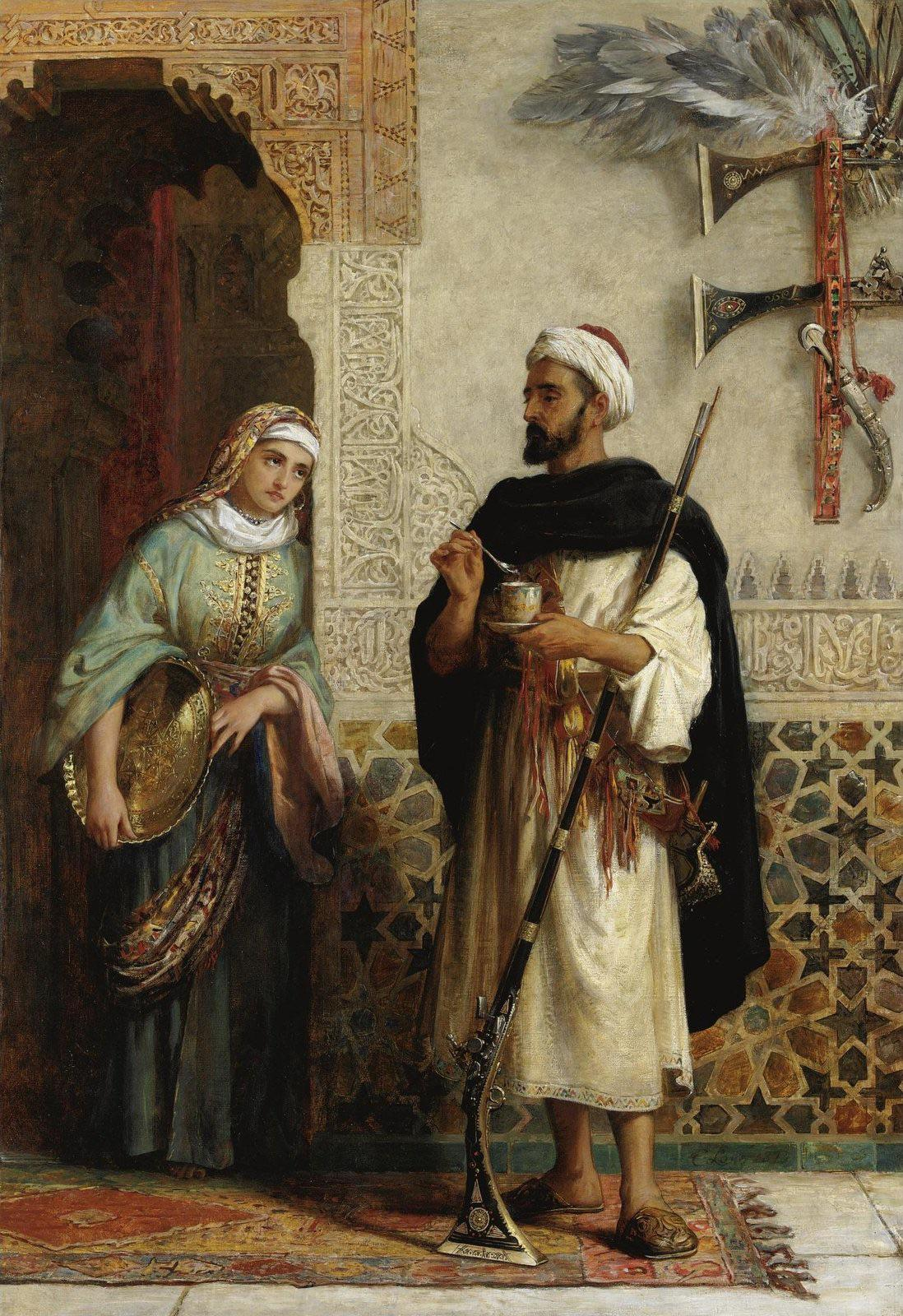
The Palace Guard, 1887

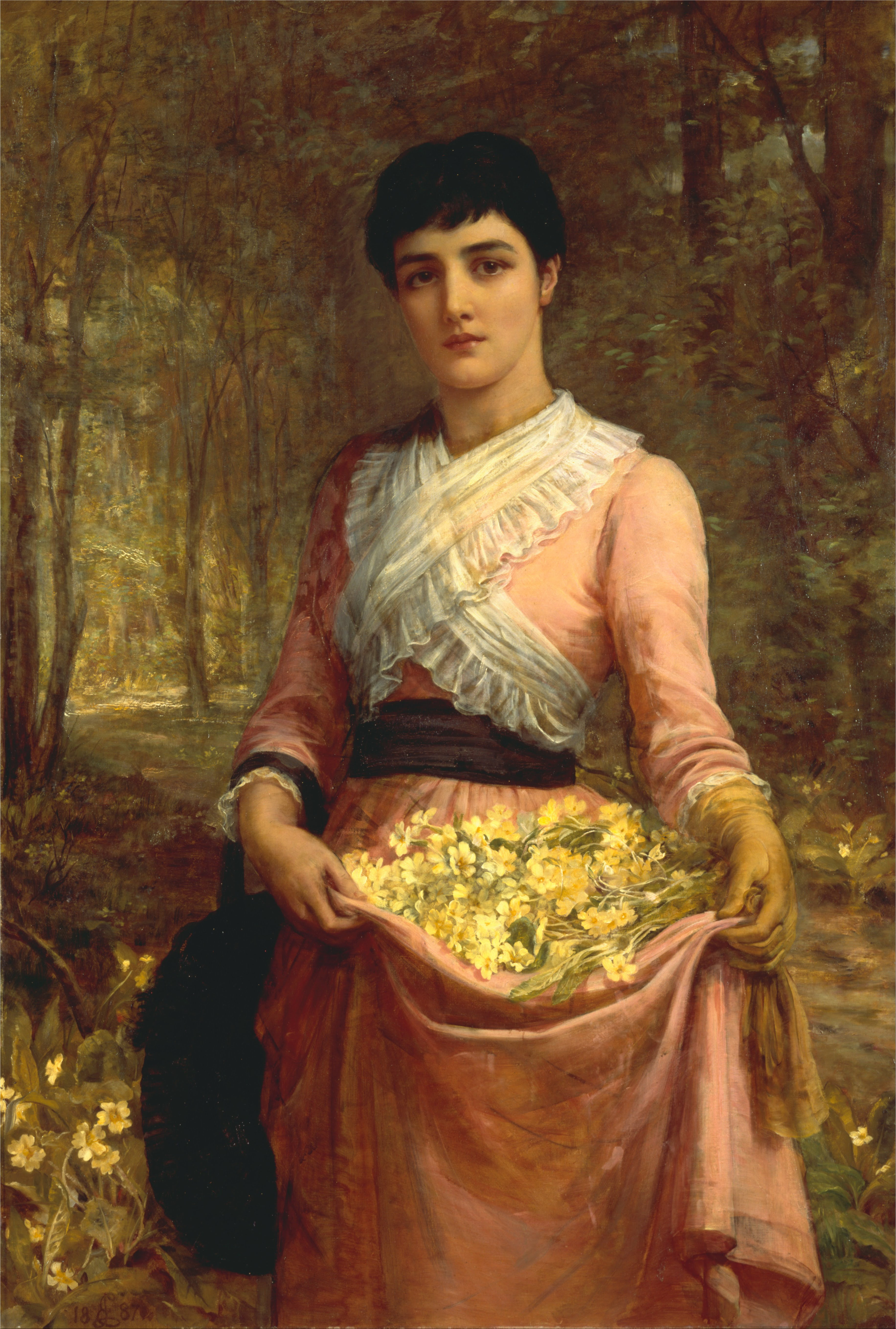
England, The Primrose, 1887

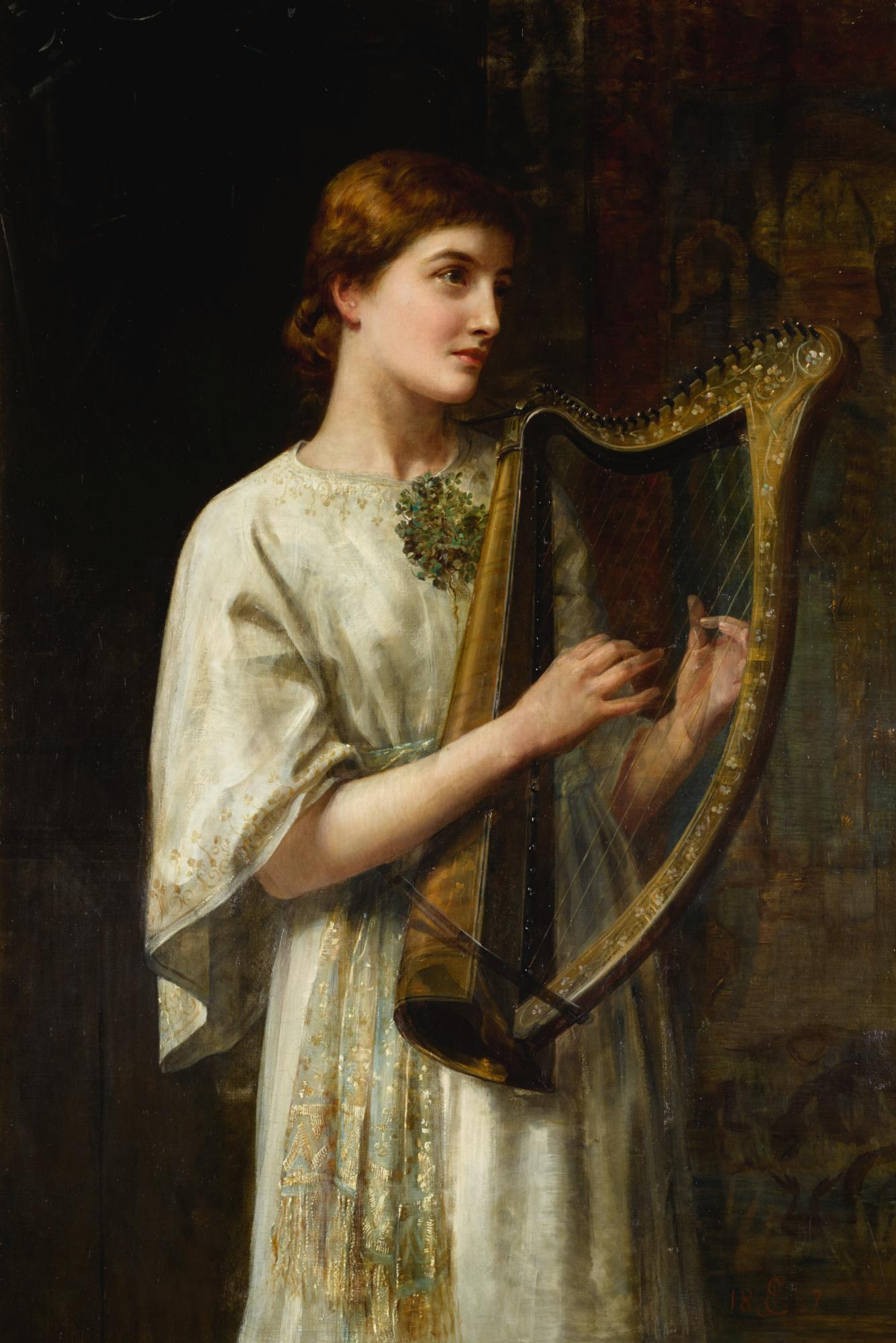
Ireland, 1887

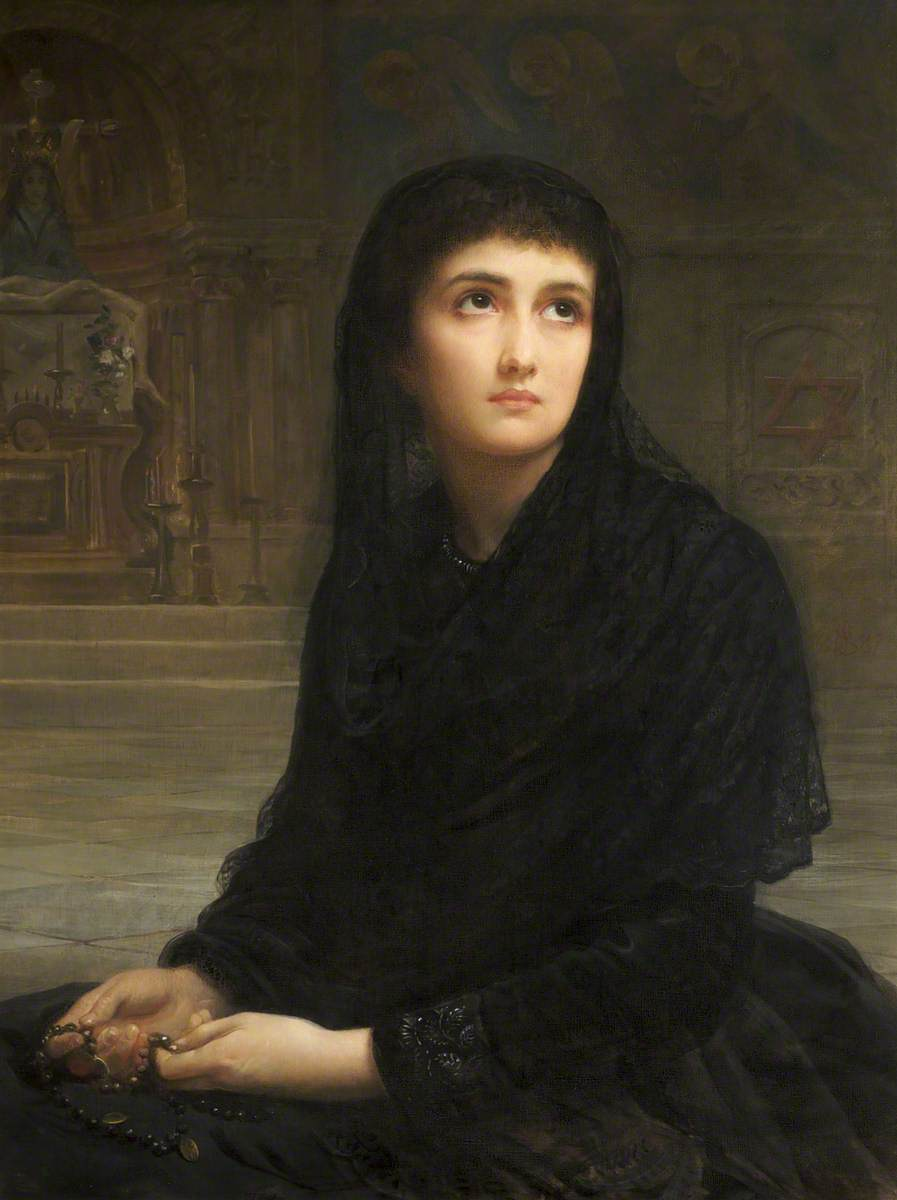
A Girl of Trinidad, 1887

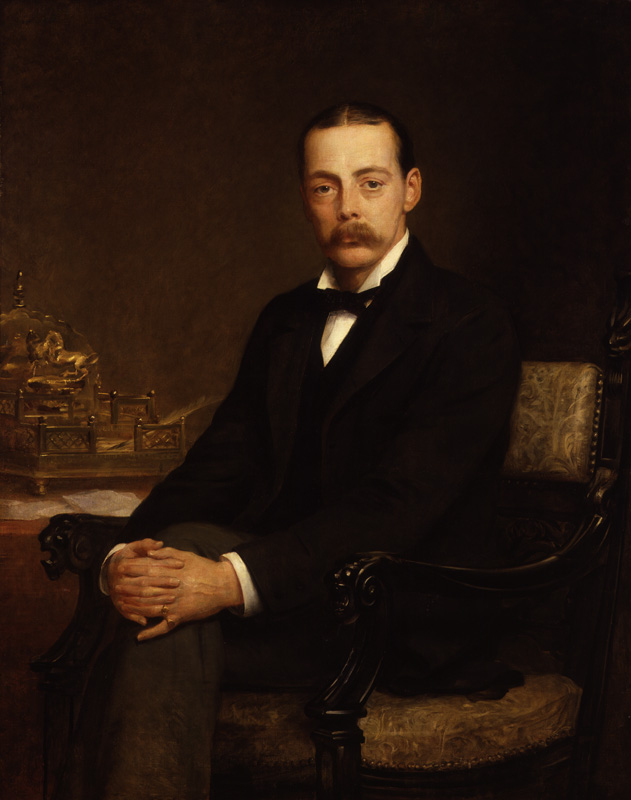
Portrait of Lord Randolph Churchill, 1888

== See also ==
- List of Orientalist artists
