= The Sentinel of Pompeii =

Archaeological myth

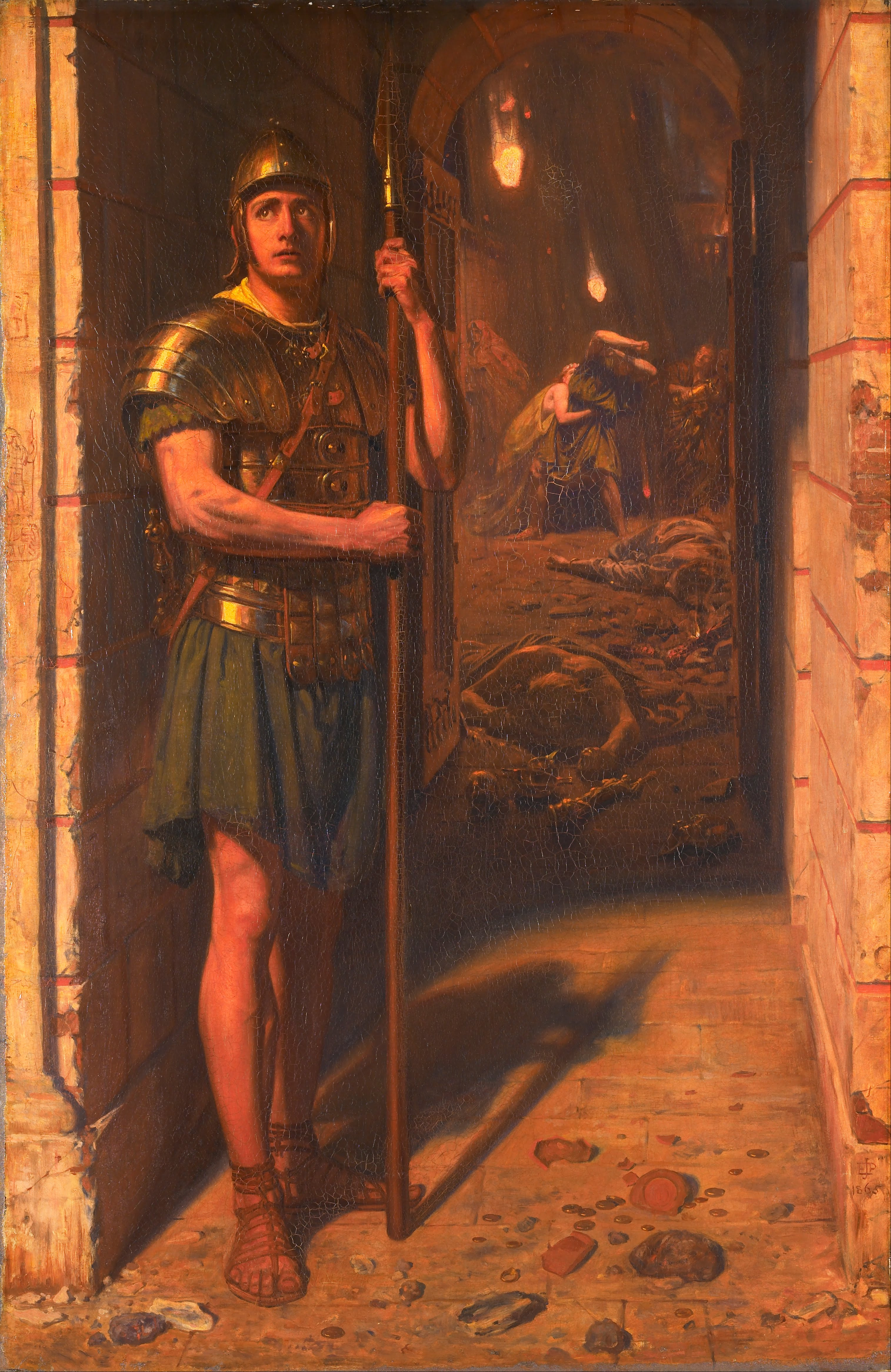
Edward John Poynter's Faithful unto Death (1865)

The Sentinel of Pompeii is a long-standing myth about a Roman soldier who remained at his post during the eruption of Mount Vesuvius in 79 CE. The legend, while founded ostensibly on a real discovery made during the eighteen-century excavations of Pompeii, is not based on any conclusive archaeological evidence. However, the idea of the perfect, dutiful soldier took off in Victorian imaginations. Most notably, this myth is the inspiration for Edward John Poynter's painting Faithful unto Death (1865) and Harriet Hosmer's now lost sculpture Sentinel of Pompeii (1878). The sentinel also features in Edward Bulwer-Lytton's novel The Last Days of Pompeii (1834).

== History ==
In December 1762, excavator, artist and curator of the Museum Herculanense, Camillo Paderni uncovered a set of tombs along the Street of the Tombs, leading towards the Herculaneum gate at the northwest end of the city. On August 13, 1763, a small vaulted niche was found to the left of the gate on the outer wall. The inscription inside included the name 'M. Cerrinius Restitutus'. Now known as Restitutus's tomb, for many years this was known as the resting place of the famed sentinel of Pompeii.

The first published mention of the sentinel is Sir William Gell's Pompeiana (1817-9):

"[In an] arched recess, around and without which seats are formed... was found a human skeleton, of which the hand still grasped a lance. Conjecture has imagined this the remains of a sentinel, who preferred dying on his post to quitting it for the more ignominious death..."

Though Gell notes that the story surrounding the sentinel is in fact the subject of imagination, he still maintains the existence of a skeleton as a fact, though excavators never mention a skeleton or lance. It is theorised that the myth was created by the cicerones of Pompeii based on embellished details of actual archaeological discoveries to amuse tourists. The sentinel is also mentioned in a speech by Dr. Joseph C. Stiles, a chaplain to the Army of North Virginia, dated to February 17, 1865:

"The earth beneath him heaved and rocked, but he kept his post! The air was whirling madly around him, but he kept his post! Before him the mountain was belching forth its bowels of fire—but he kept his post!... My countrymen!... That old sentinel is the model man for you!"

== Representations ==
- Edward Bulwer-Lytton's novel The Last Days of Pompeii (1834) — Bulwer-Lytton portrays a sentinel standing upright at the Herculaneum Gate while the novel's protagonists run past to escape the burning city.
- Edward John Poynter's painting Faithful unto Death (1865)
- Mark Twain's travel book The Innocents Abroad (1869) — Twain praises the soldier, and humorously compares him to a modern policeman.
- Harriet Hosmer's sculpture Sentinel of Pompeii (1878)
- Henry Abbey's poem The Roman Sentinel (1885)
