= Faithful unto Death =

Faithful unto Death may refer to:

- Faithful unto Death (novel), a 1996 novel by Caroline Graham
- Faithful unto Death (painting), an 1865 painting by Edward Poynter
