= The Visit of the Queen of Sheba to King Solomon =

Painting by Edward Poynter

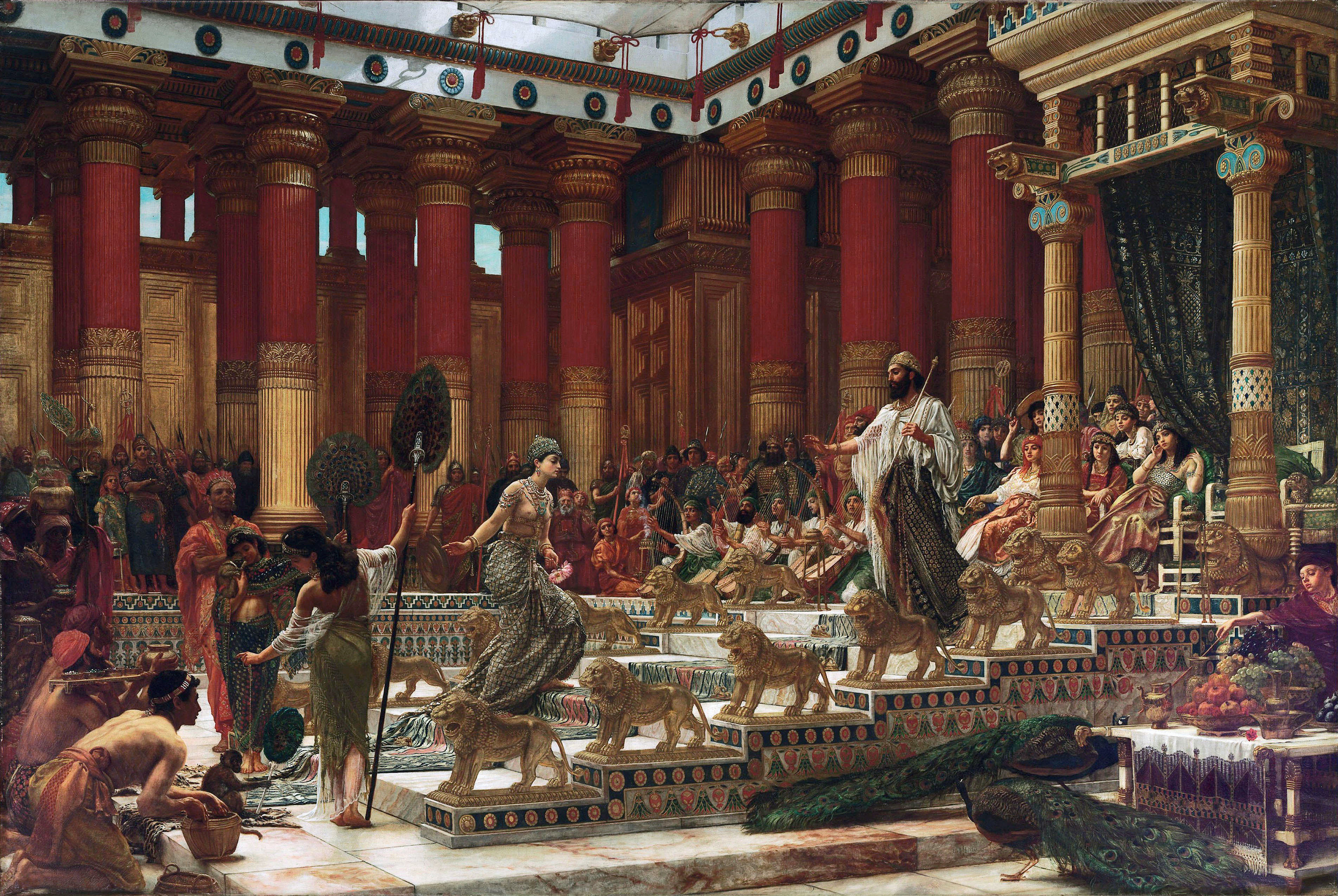
- Artist: Edward Poynter
- Year: 1890
- Medium: Oil on canvas, history painting
- Dimensions: 234.5 cm × 350.5 cm (92.3 in × 138.0 in)
- Location: Art Gallery of New South Wales; Sydney

The Visit of the Queen of Sheba to King Solomon is an 1890 history painting by the British artist Edward Poynter. It depicts the biblical scene of the Queen of Sheba at the court of the Israeli King Solomon. The work was widely discussed as being Poynter's masterpiece and praised for its "archaeological accuracy". Today the painting is in the collection of the Art Gallery of New South Wales in Sydney, having been purchased in 1892.

== See also ==
- The Queen of Sheba Visits King Solomon, a 1559 painting by Lucas de Heere

== Bibliography ==
- Goldhill, Simon. The Buried Life of Things. Cambridge University Press, 2015.
- Hollander, Anne. Seeing Through Clothes. University of California Press, 1993.
- Moser, Stephanie. Painting Antiquity: Ancient Egypt in the Art of Lawrence Alma-Tadema, Edward Poynter and Edwin Long. Oxford University Press, 2020.
