= Water Babies (painting) =

Painting by Edward Poynter

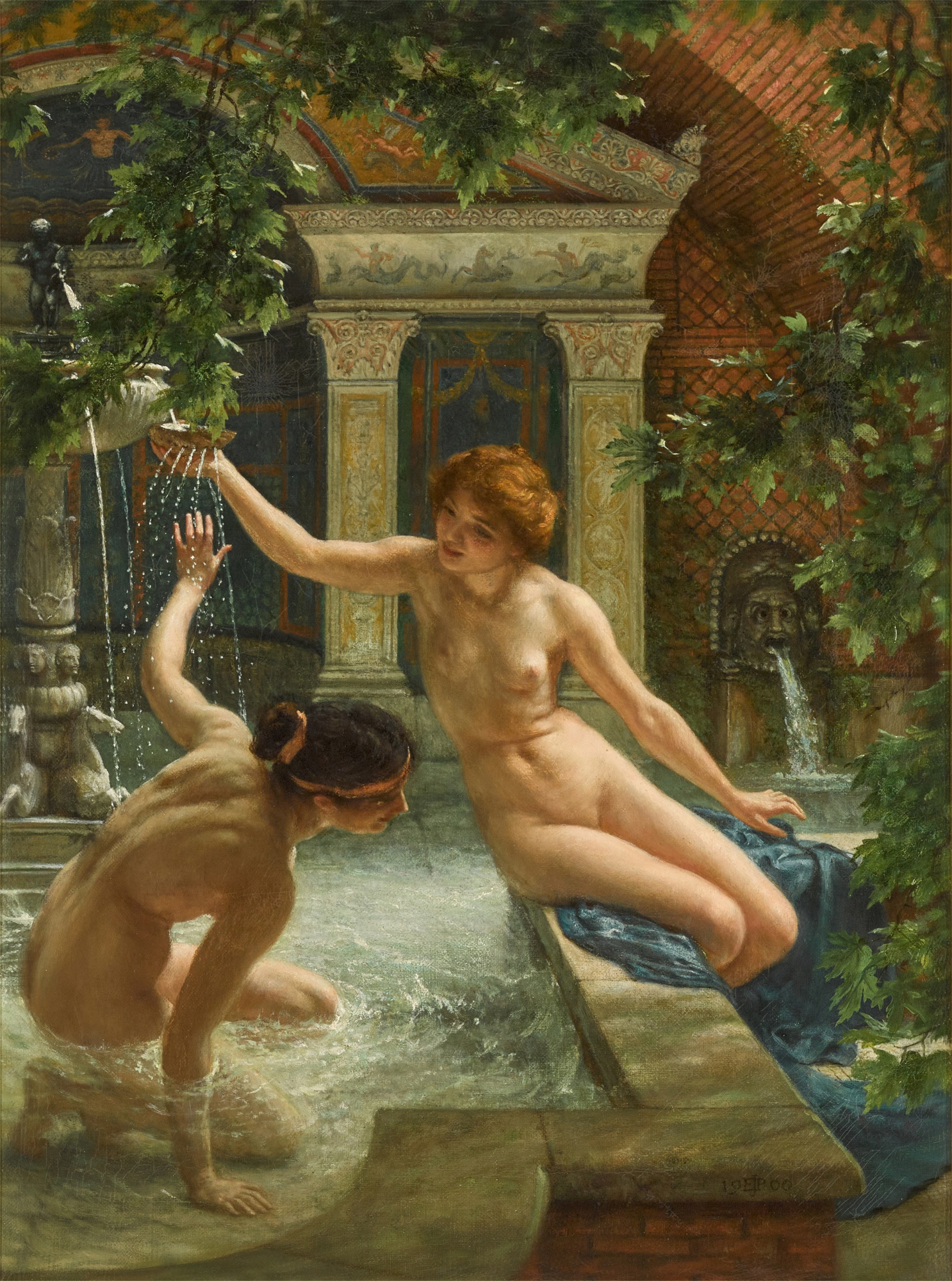
- Artist: Edward Poynter
- Year: 1900
- Medium: Oil on canvas, history painting
- Dimensions: 51 cm × 38.5 cm (20 in × 15.2 in)
- Location: Private collection

Water Babies is a 1900 oil painting by the British artist Edward Poynter. A blend of history painting and nude art, it shows two woman bathing in Ancient Rome. Poynter had been elected as President of the Royal Academy in 1896 in succession to John Everett Millais and held the position until his death in 1919.The painting was displayed at the Royal Academy's Summer Exhibition of 1900 at Burlington House. It has more recently been auctioned at Sotheby's.

== Bibliography ==
- Liversidge, Michael & Edwards, Catherine. Imagining Rome British Artists and Rome in the Nineteenth Century. Merrell Holberton, 1996.
- Toll, Simon. Herbert Draper, 1863-1920: A Life Study. Antique Collectors' Club, 2003.
- Wood, Christopher. Olympian Dreamers: Victorian Classical Painters, 1860-1914. Constable, 1983.
