= The Ides of March (painting) =

Painting by Edward Poynter

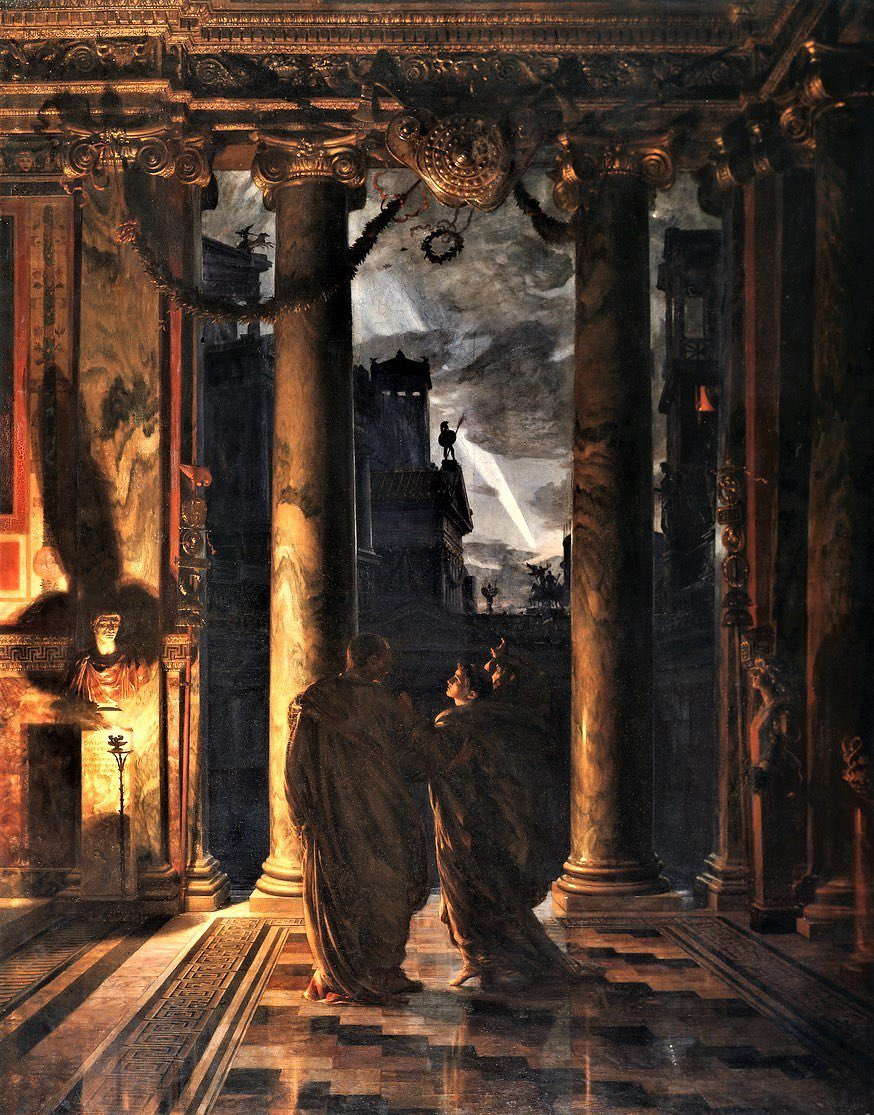
- Artist: Edward Poynter
- Year: 1883
- Medium: Oil on canvas, history painting
- Dimensions: 153 cm × 112.6 cm (60 in × 44.3 in)
- Location: Manchester Art Gallery, Manchester

The Ides of March is an oil on canvas history painting by the British artist Edward Poynter, from 1883. It is held at the Manchester Art Gallery.

== History and description ==
The painting portrays the lead-up to the Assassination of Julius Caesar, in 44 BC, as depicted in William Shakespeare's play Julius Caesar. It makes reference to the Ides of March, with Julius Caesar and his wife Calphurnia spotting a comet in the night sky, confirming the warning of his impending death made by a soothsayer. In the shadowy room she implores her husband not to visit the Senate where his enemies plan to murder him. The scene has a dark and sinister mood, as if predicting the upcoming tragedy. It was part of a fashion for paintings set in Ancient Rome produced during the Victorian era.

Today the painting is in the Manchester Art Gallery, having been purchased from the artist in 1883.

== Bibliography ==
- Barrow, Rosemary J. The Use of Classical Art and Literature by Victorian Painters, 1860-1912: Creating Continuity with the Traditions of High Art. Edwin Mellen Press, 2007.
- MacCarthy, Fiona. The Last Pre-Raphaelite: Edward Burne-Jones and the Victorian Imagination. Harvard University Press, 2012.
