= The Fortune Teller (Poynter) =

Painting by Edward Poynter

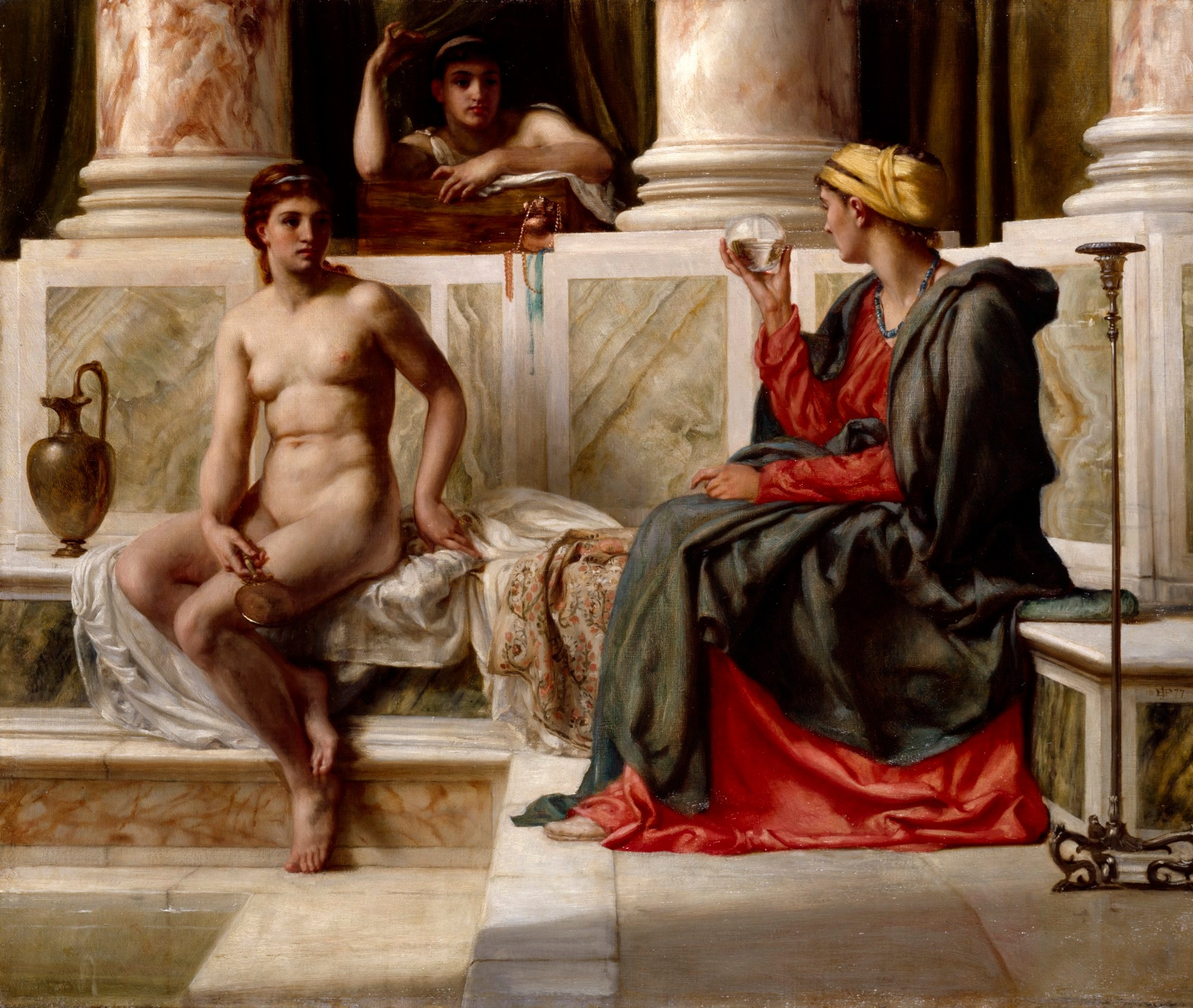
- Artist: Edward Poynter
- Year: 1877
- Type: Oil on canvas, history painting
- Dimensions: 62.2 cm × 76.5 cm (24.5 in × 30.1 in)
- Location: Royal Academy, London

The Fortune Teller is an oil on canvas historical genre painting by the British artist Edward Poynter, from 1877. It is held at the Royal Academy, in London.

It depicts a scene in an Ancient Greek bathouse, where an aristocratic woman, who appears naked, consults a fortune teller with a crystal ball. Another woman watches the scene.Poynter presented the painting to the Royal Academy of Arts at his diploma work. It was displayed at the Royal Academy Exhibition of 1877 at Burlington House. He later served as President of the Royal Academy from 1896 to 1918.

== Bibliography ==
- Bury, Stephen (ed.) Benezit Dictionary of British Graphic Artists and Illustrators, Volume 1. OUP, 2012.
- Hartley, Lucy. Democratising Beauty in Nineteenth-Century Britain: Art and the Politics of Public Life. Cambridge University Press, 2017.
- Wright, Christopher, Gordon, Catherine May & Smith, Mary Peskett. British and Irish Paintings in Public Collections: An Index of British and Irish Oil Paintings by Artists Born Before 1870 in Public and Institutional Collections in the United Kingdom and Ireland. Yale University Press, 2006.
