= Faithful unto Death (painting) =

Painting by Edward Poynter

Faithful Unto Death
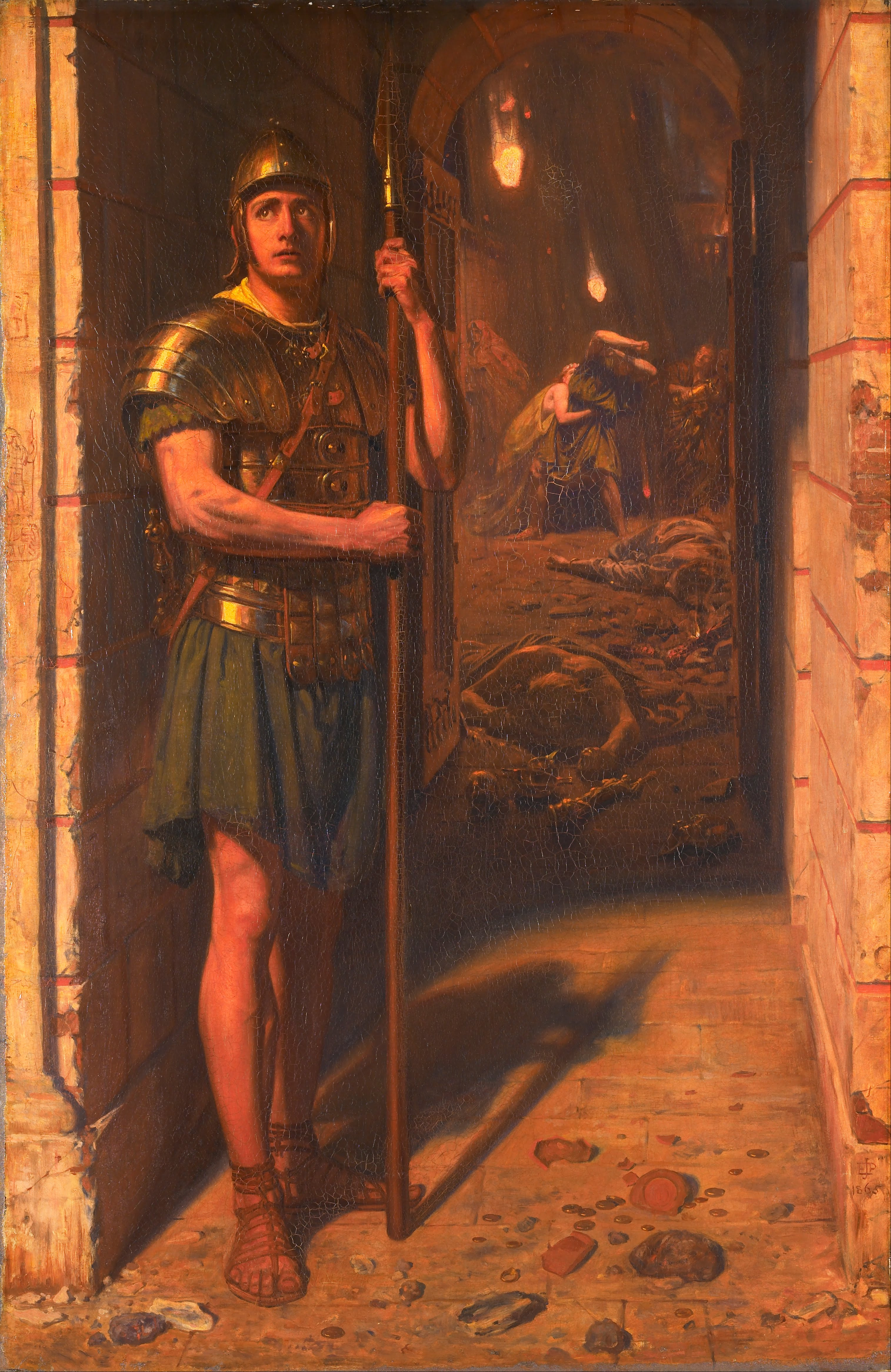
- Artist: Edward Poynter
- Year: 1865
- Medium: Oil on canvas, history painting
- Dimensions: 115 cm × 75.5 cm (45 in × 29.7 in)
- Location: Walker Art Gallery, Liverpool

Faithful Unto Death is an oil on canvas history painting by the British artist Edward Poynter, from 1865. It is held at the Walker Art Gallery, in Liverpool.

== History and description ==
It shows a scene where the eruption of Vesuvius in 79 AD, a Roman Legionary remains stoically at his post amidst the chaos.

Poynter drew inspiration from the excavations at Pompeii which revealed the skeleton of a soldier in full armour who remained at his post. He was likely also influenced by a passage from the 1834 novel The Last Days of Pompeii by Edward Bulwer-Lytton, in which features a sentry who remains on duty despite the destruction. While the painting was widely accepted as a depiction of heroism, it may also have been critical of the soldier's unquestioning submission to an oppressive regime, a theme that recurs in several other pictures by Poynter.

The painting was displayed at the Royal Academy Exhibition of 1865 at the National Gallery, in London. It has been in the collection of the Walker Art Gallery, in Liverpool, since being acquired in 1874.

== Bibliography ==
- Belhman, Lee. The Sentinel of Pompeii: An Exemplum for the Nineteenth Century. In J. L. Seydl, & V. Gardner Coates. Antiquity Recovered: The Legacy of Pompeii and Herculaneum (pp. 157-70). Getty Trust Publications, 2007.
- Coates, Victoria C. Gardner, Lapatin, Kenneth D. S. & Seydl, Jon L. The Last Days of Pompeii: Decadence, Apocalypse, Resurrection. J. Paul Getty Museum, 2012.
- Liversidge, Michael & Edwards, Catherine. Imagining Rome British Artists and Rome in the Nineteenth Century. Merrell Holberton, 1996.
