= Edward Poynter =

British artist (1836–1919)

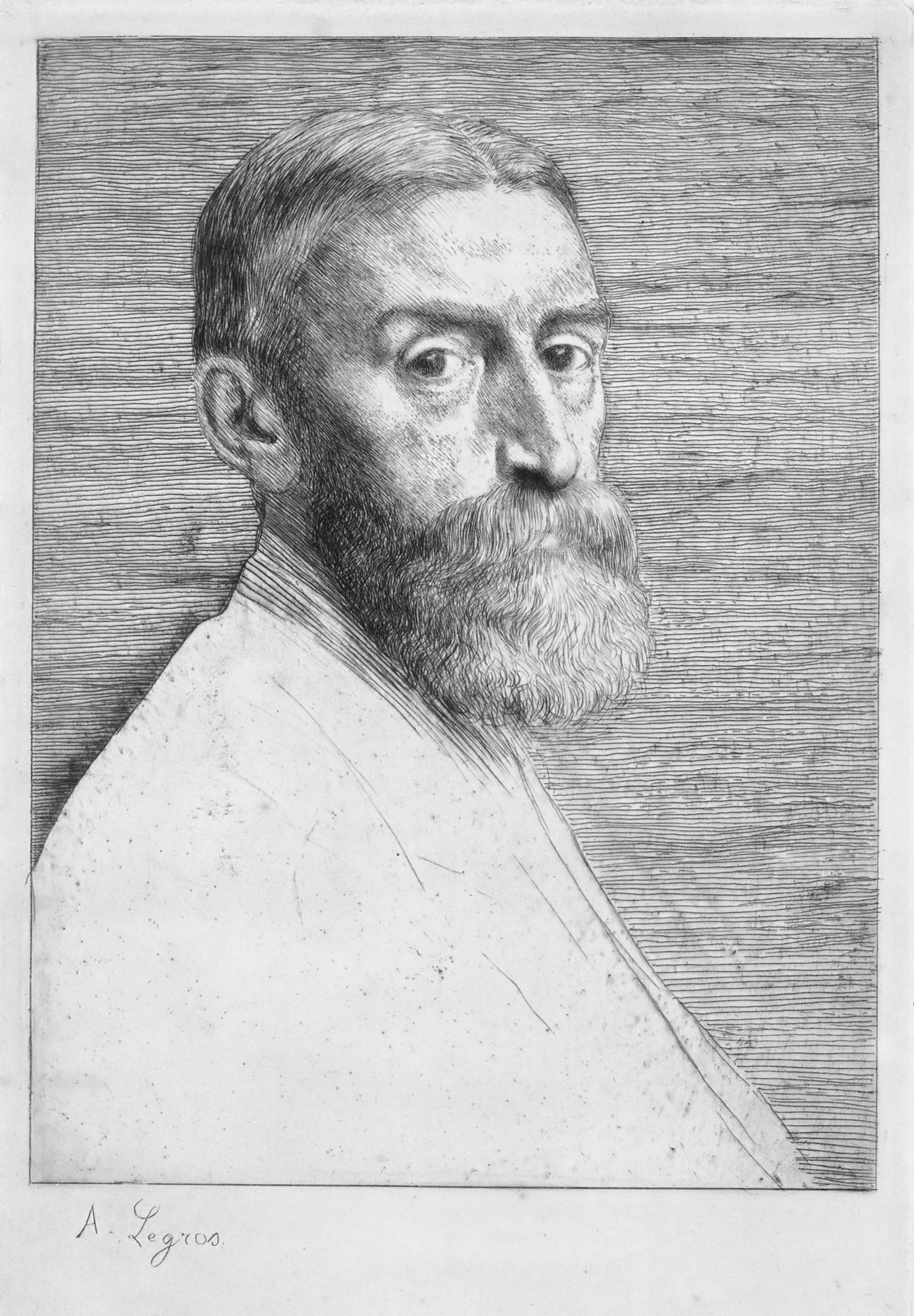
- Edward Poynter, 1877 (Alphonse Legros)
- Born: Edward John Poynter; 20 March 1836; Paris, France
- Died: 26 July 1919 (aged 83); London, England, United Kingdom
- Education: Brighton College; Ipswich School
- Occupations: Painter, designer, and draughtsman
- Spouse: Agnes MacDonald
- Children: 3

Sir Edward John Poynter, 1st Baronet GCVO, PRA (20 March 1836 – 26 July 1919) was an English painter, designer, and draughtsman, who served as President of the Royal Academy.

== Life ==
Poynter was the son of architect Ambrose Poynter. He was born in Paris, France, though his parents returned to Britain soon after his birth. He was educated at Brighton College and Ipswich School, but left school early for reasons of ill health, spending winters in Madeira and Rome. In 1853, he met Frederick Leighton in Rome, who made a great impression on the 17-year-old Poynter. On his return to London he studied at Leigh's Academy in Newman Street and the Royal Academy Schools, before going to Paris to study in the studio of the classicist painter Charles Gleyre where James McNeill Whistler and George du Maurier were fellow-students.

In 1866 Poynter married the famous beauty Agnes MacDonald, daughter of the Rev. G. B. MacDonald of Wolverhampton, and they had three children. Her sister Georgiana married the artist Edward Burne-Jones; her sister Alice was the mother of writer Rudyard Kipling; and her sister Louisa was the mother of three-times Prime Minister of the United Kingdom Stanley Baldwin.

Poynter's sister Clara Bell became a noted translator of literary and scientific works.

== Career ==
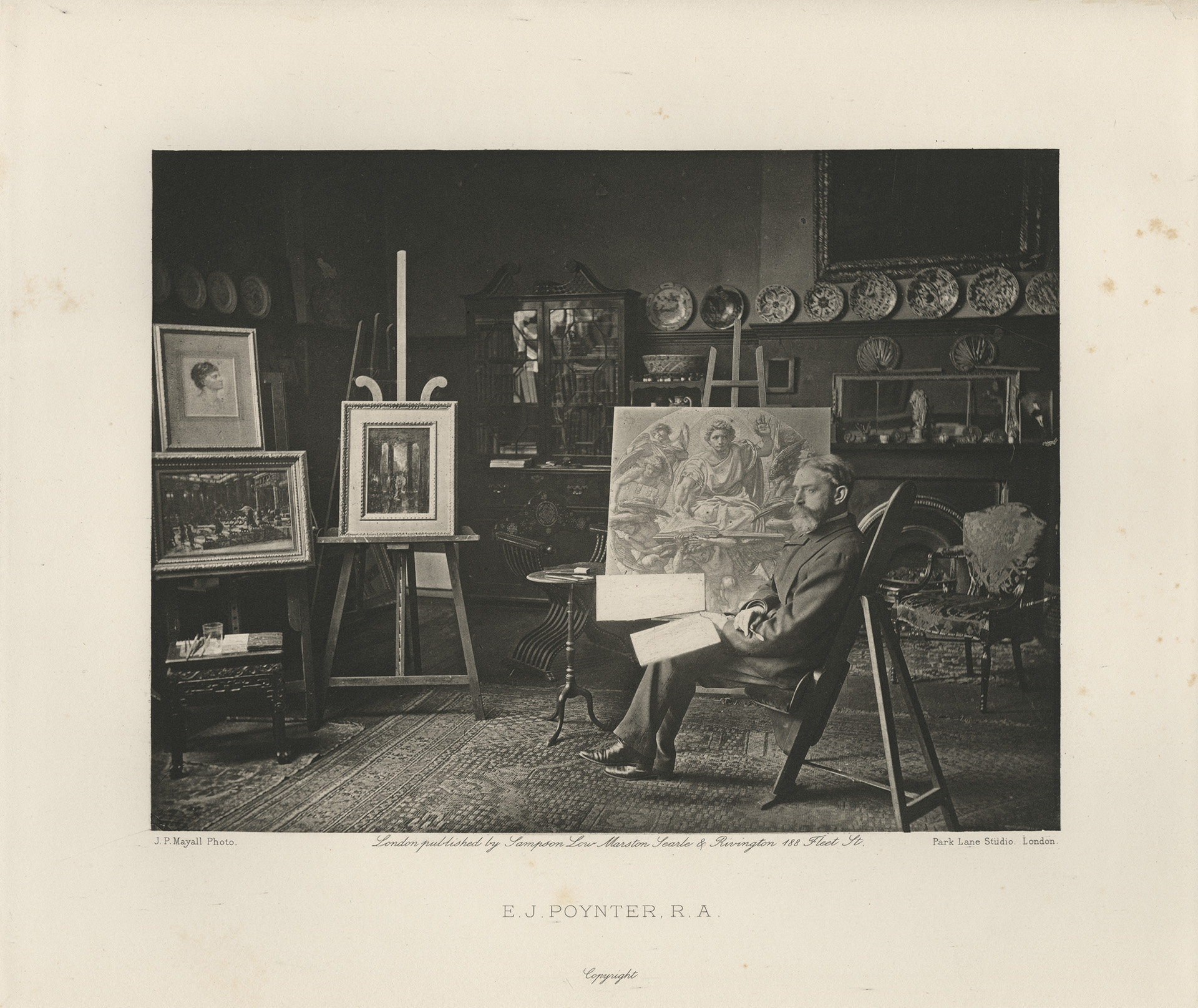
Poynter by J. P. Mayall from Artists at Home, published 1884, Department of Image Collections, National Gallery of Art Library, Washington, DC

He became best known for his large historical paintings such as Israel in Egypt (1867; Guildhall Art Gallery, London), followed by St George for England (1869), a mosaic for the Central Lobby of the Palace of Westminster, depicting St George and the Dragon and perhaps culminating with The Visit of the Queen of Sheba to King Solomon (1884–90; Art Gallery of New South Wales, Sydney). He was admitted as an associate of the Royal Academy in 1869.

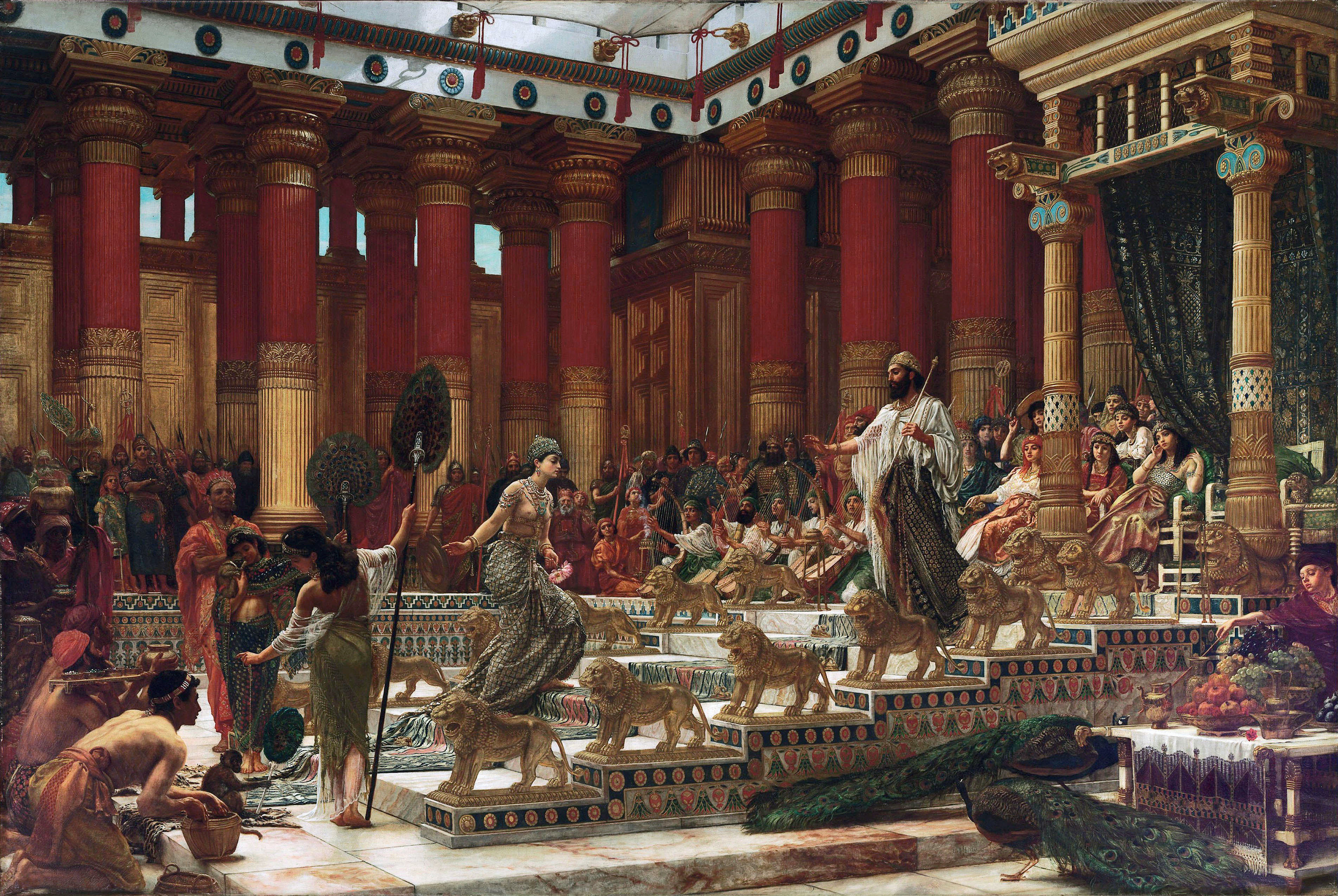
The Visit of the Queen of Sheba to King Solomon, 1890

Poynter held a number of official posts: he was the first Slade Professor at University College London from 1871 to 1875, principal of the National Art Training School from 1875 to 1881 and director of the National Gallery from 1894 to 1904 (overseeing the opening of the Tate Gallery). He became a full Royal Academician in 1876. In 1896, on the death of Sir John Millais, Poynter was elected President of the Academy. He received a knighthood in the same year and an honorary degree from Cambridge University in 1898. It was announced that he would receive a baronetcy in the 1902 Coronation Honours list published on 26 June 1902 for the (subsequently postponed) coronation of King Edward VII, and on 24 July 1902 he was created a Baronet, of Albert Gate, in the city of Westminster, in the county of London.

Poynter's old school, Brighton College, held an exhibition of Poynter's paintings and drawings entitled Life at Arms Length in its Burstow Gallery in November–December 1995.

== Works ==
=== Paintings ===
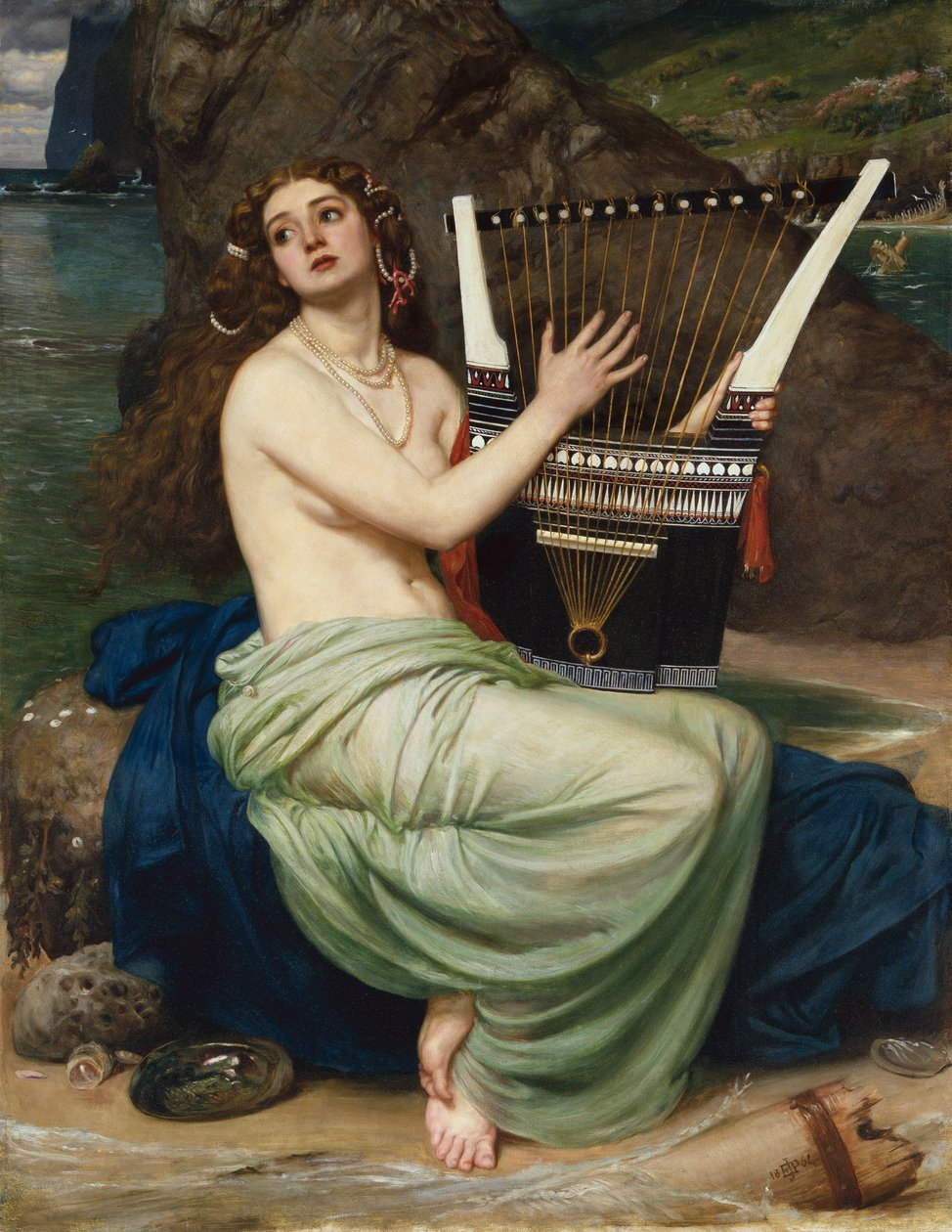
The Siren (1864)

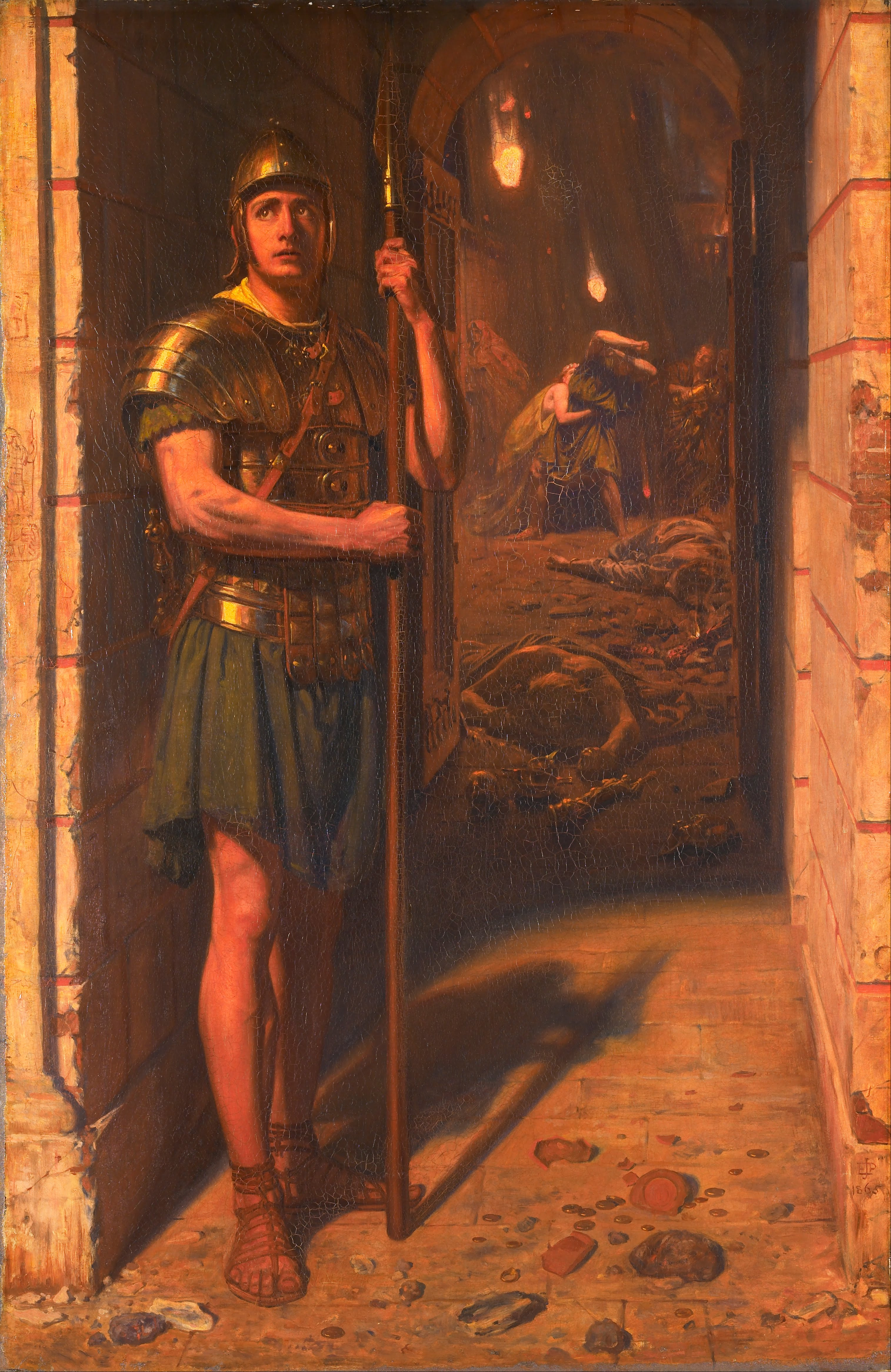
Faithful Unto Death (1865)

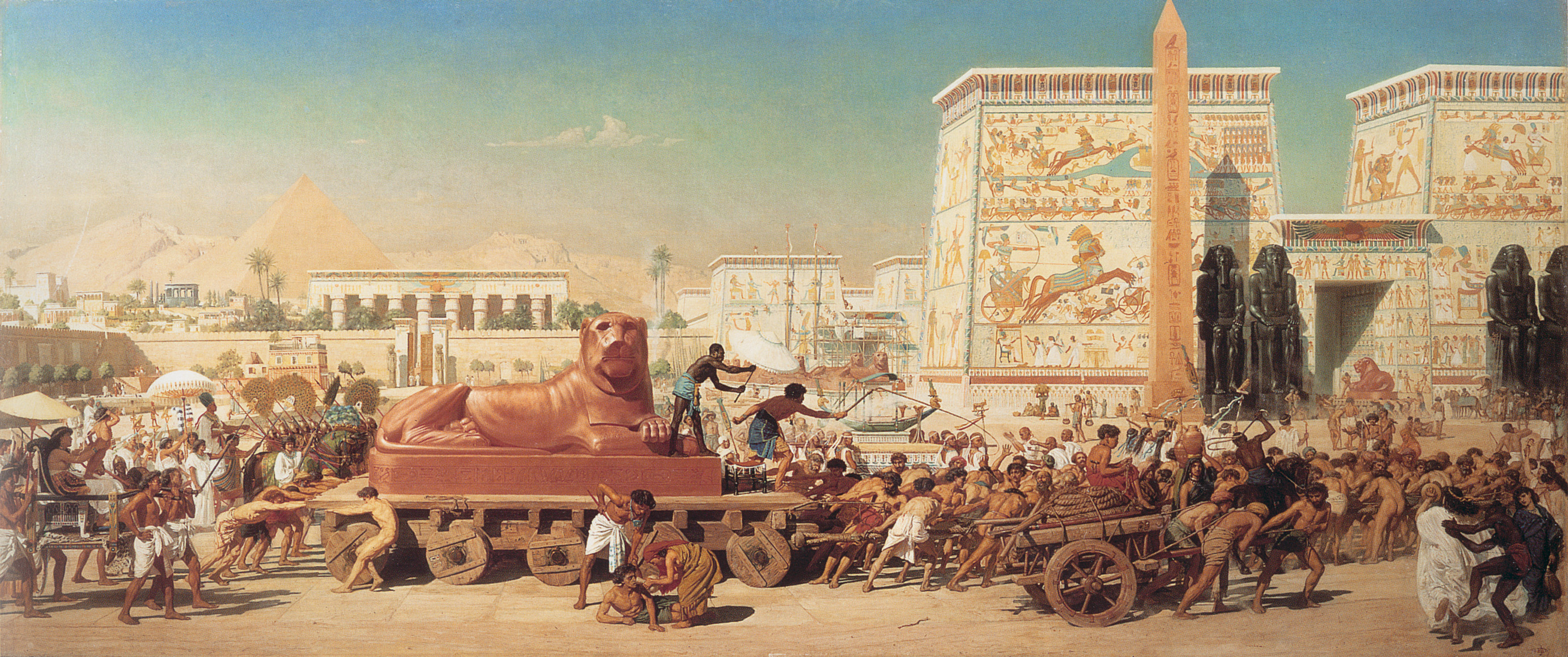
Israel in Egypt (1867)

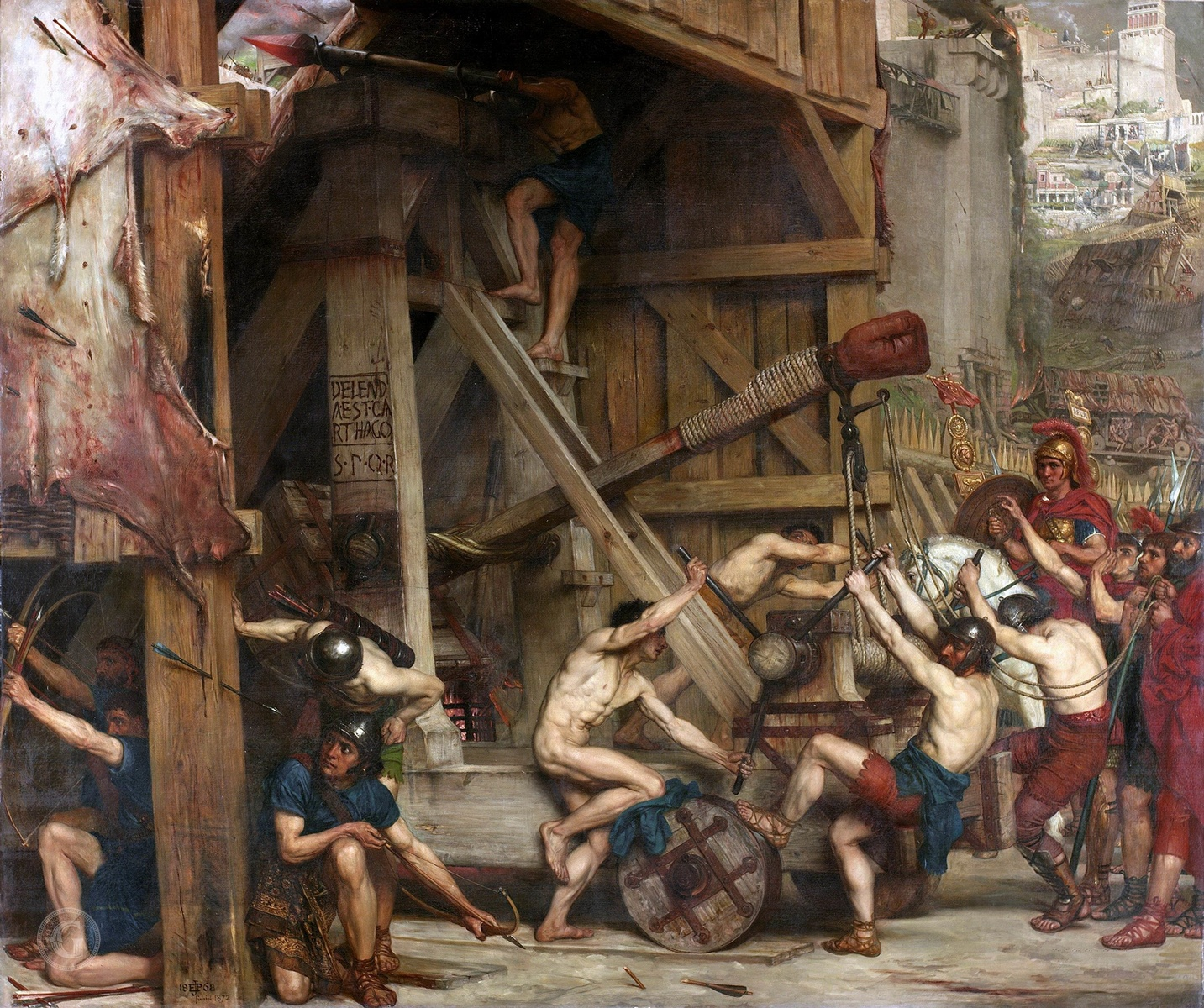
Catapulta (1868)

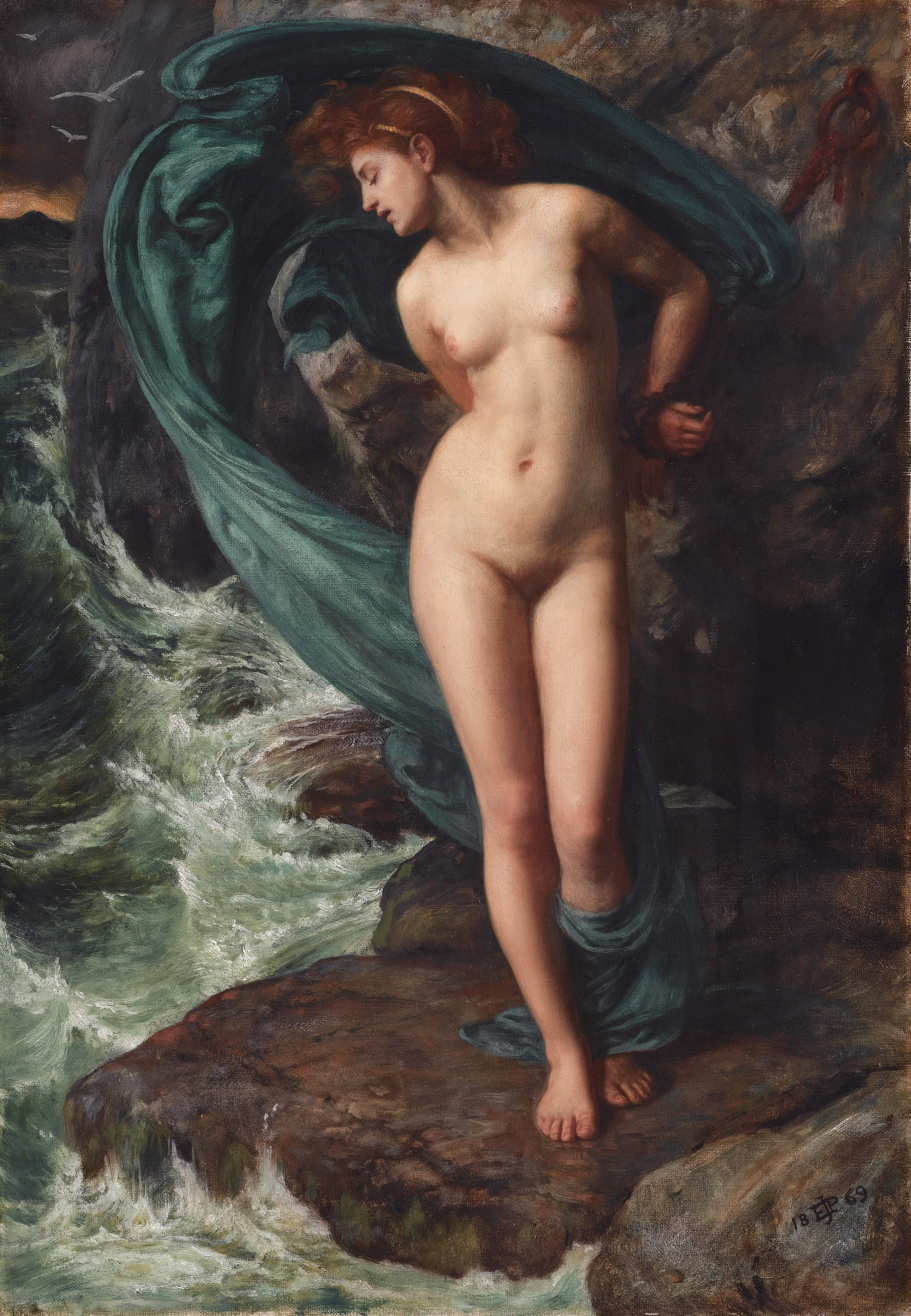
Andromeda (1869)

Rhodope (1874)

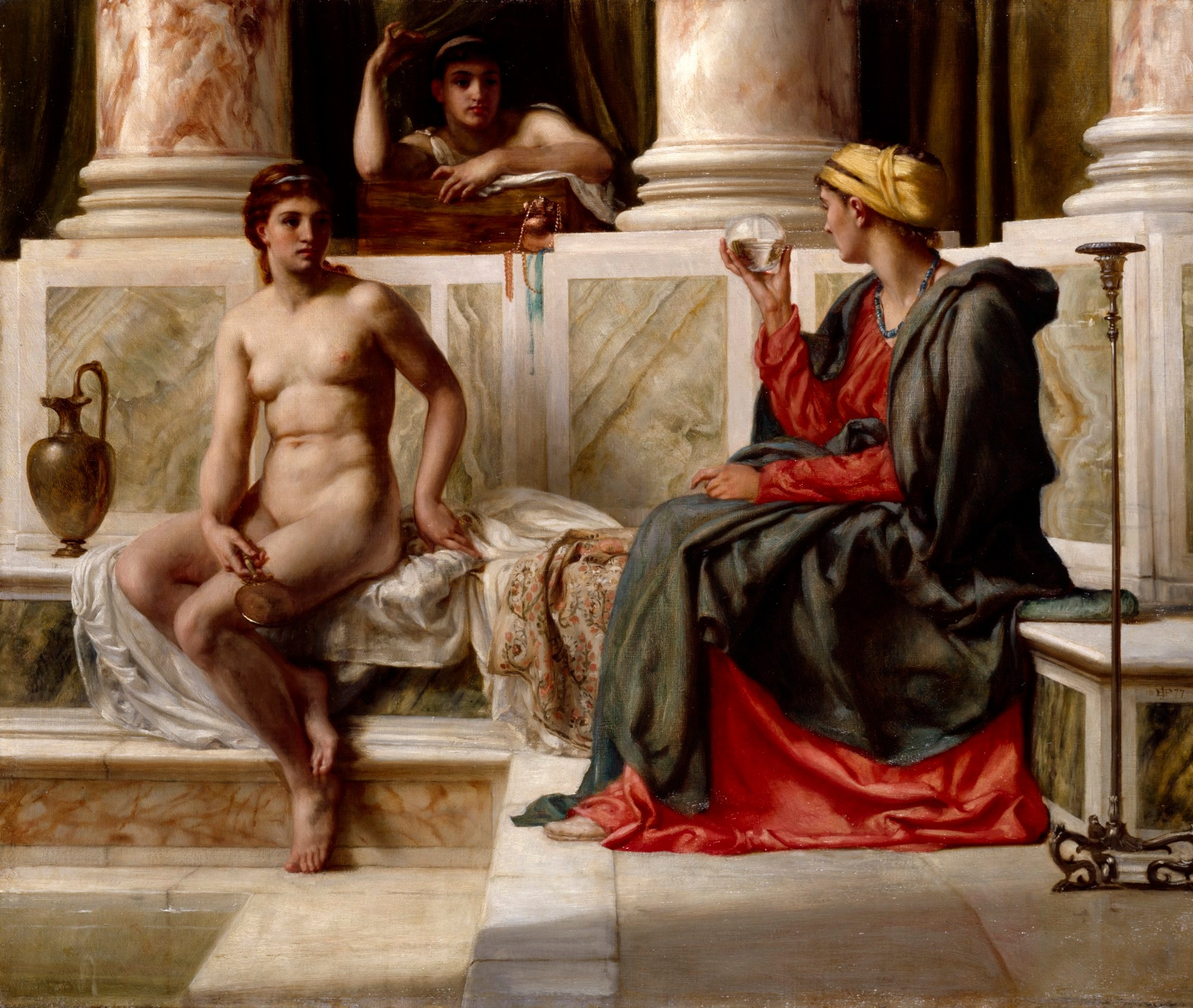
The Fortune Teller (1877)

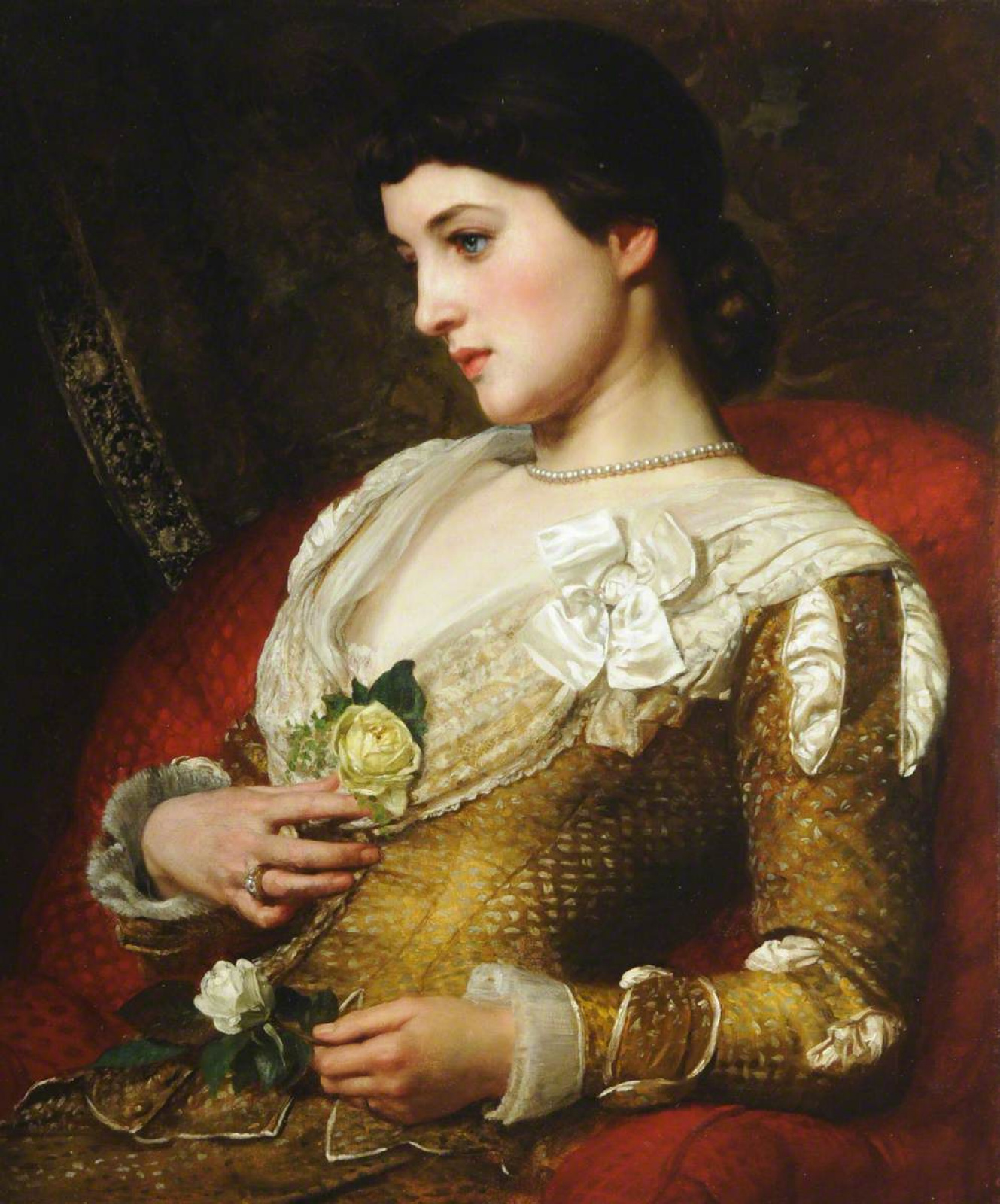
Portrait of Lillie Langtry (1878)

Zenobia Captive (1878)

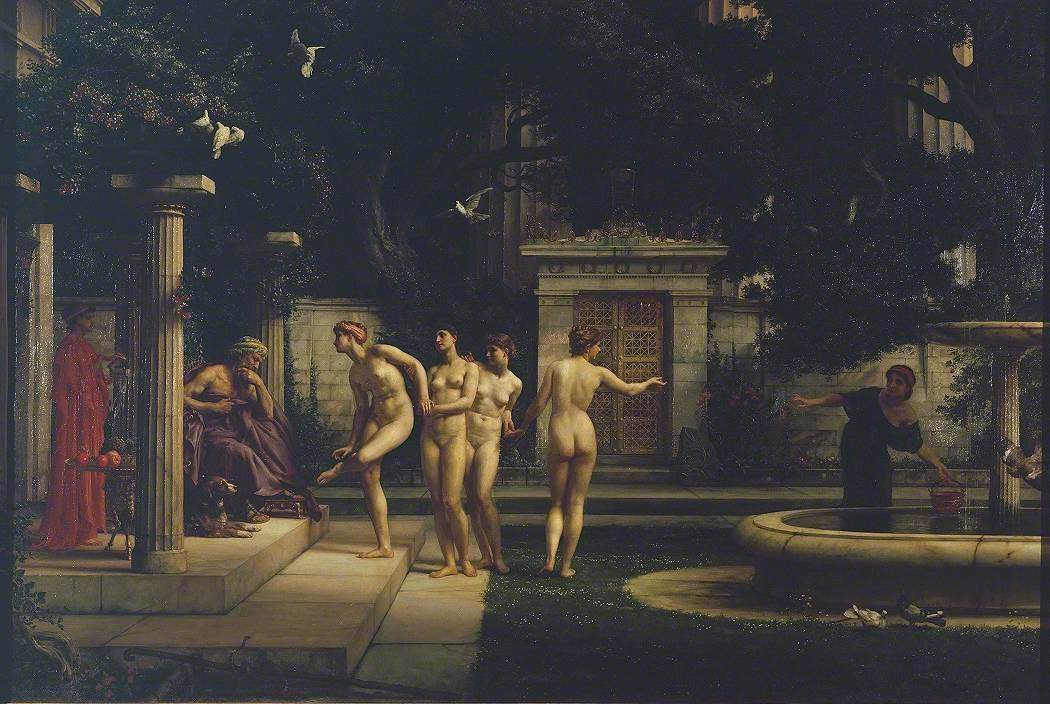
A Visit to Aesculapius (1880)

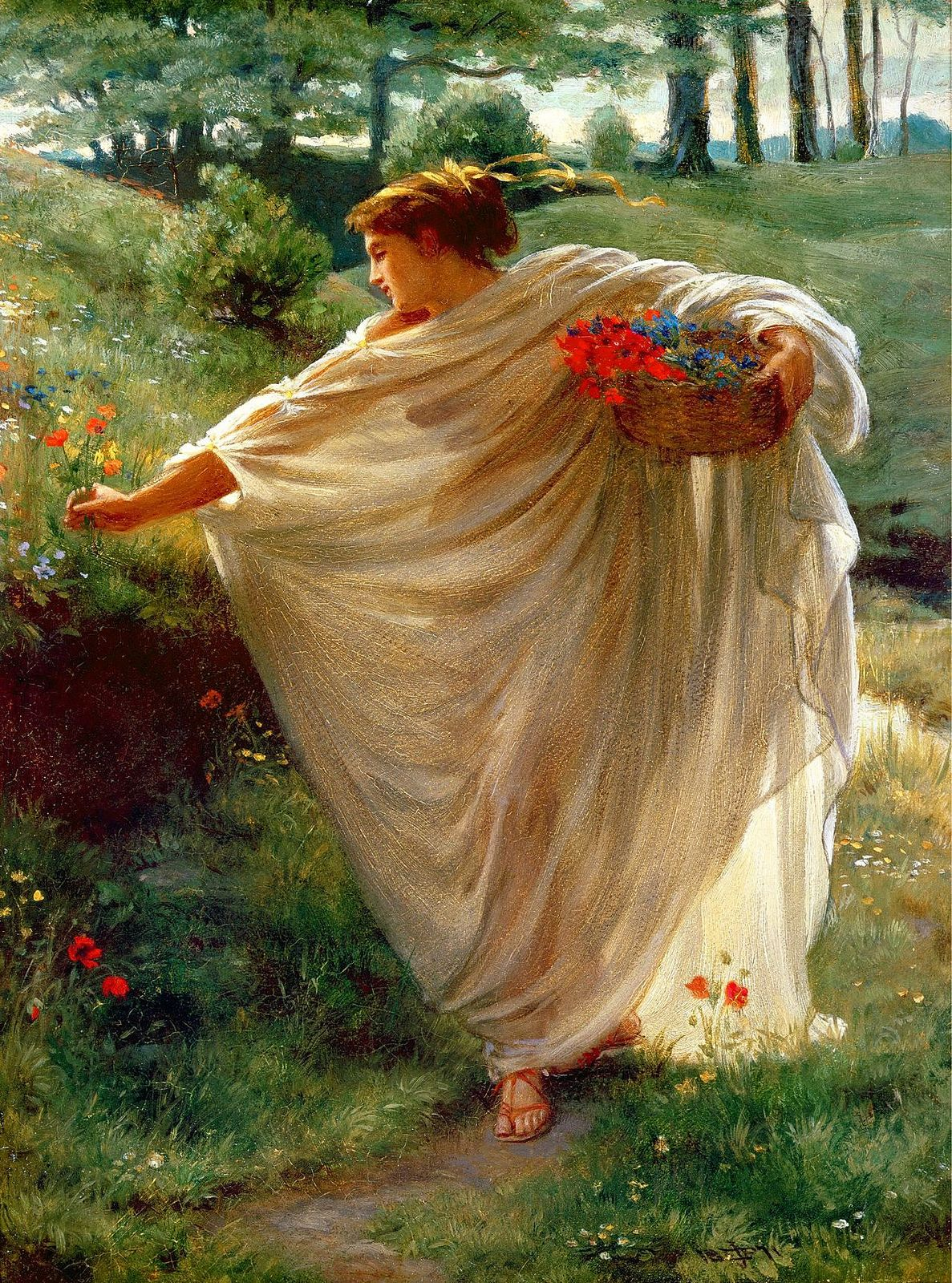
Wild Blossoms (c. 1880)

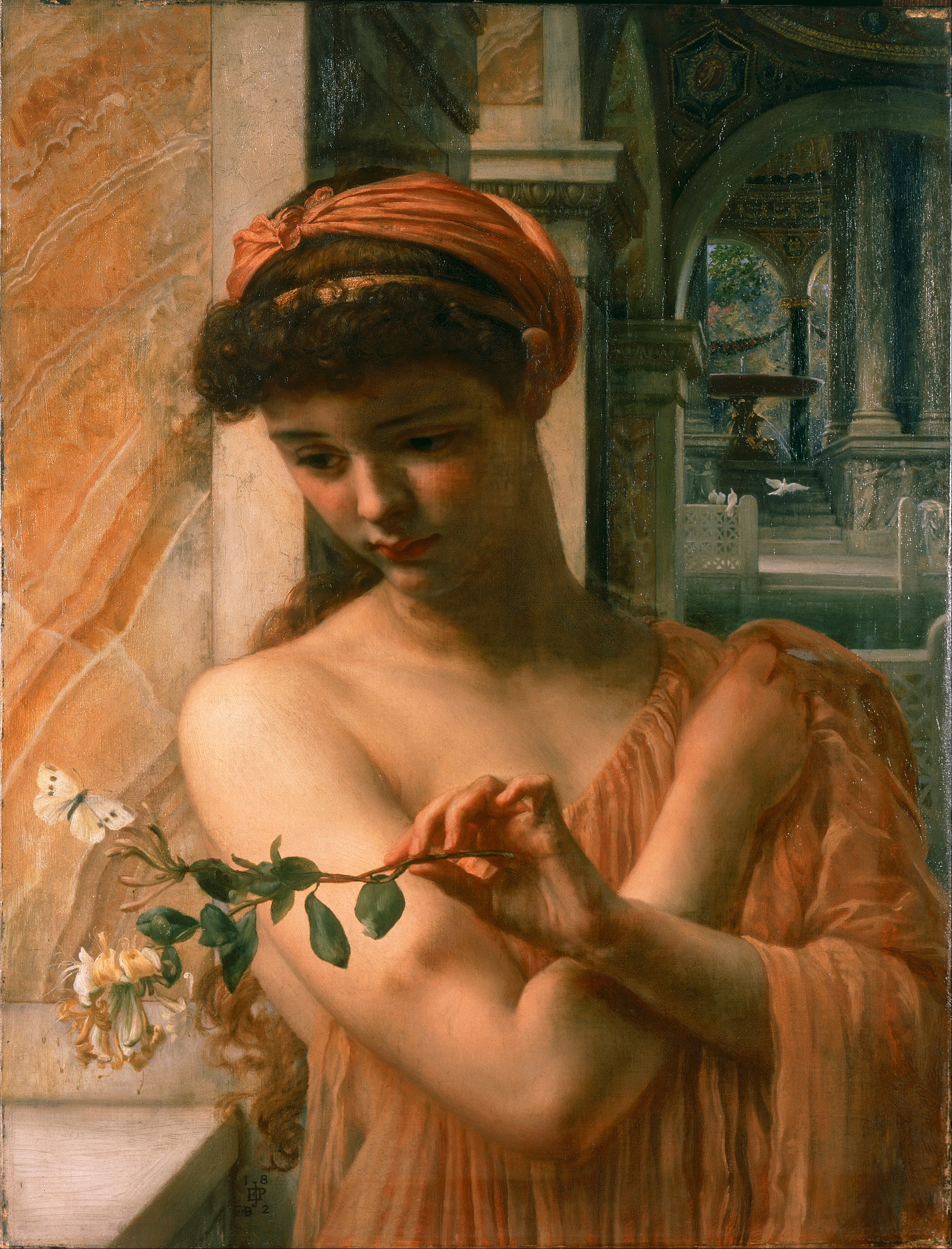
Psyche in the Temple of Love (1882)

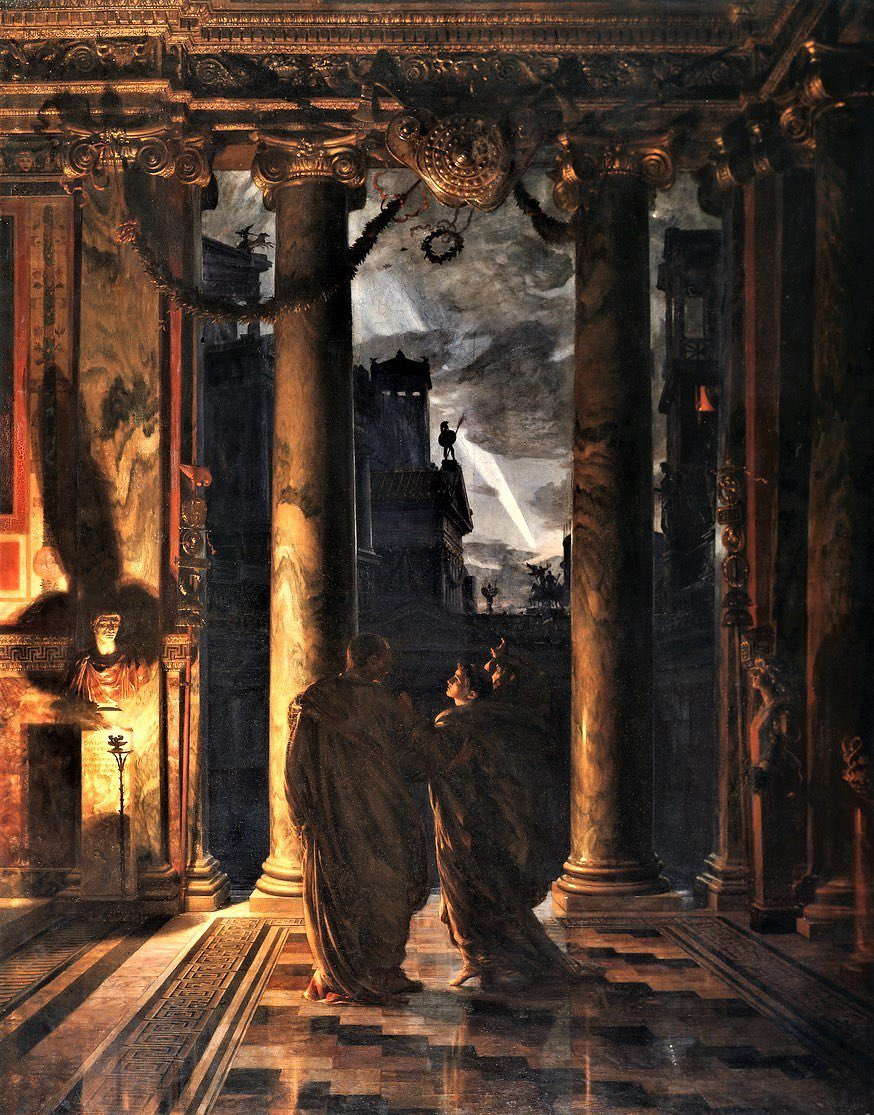
The Ides of March (1883)

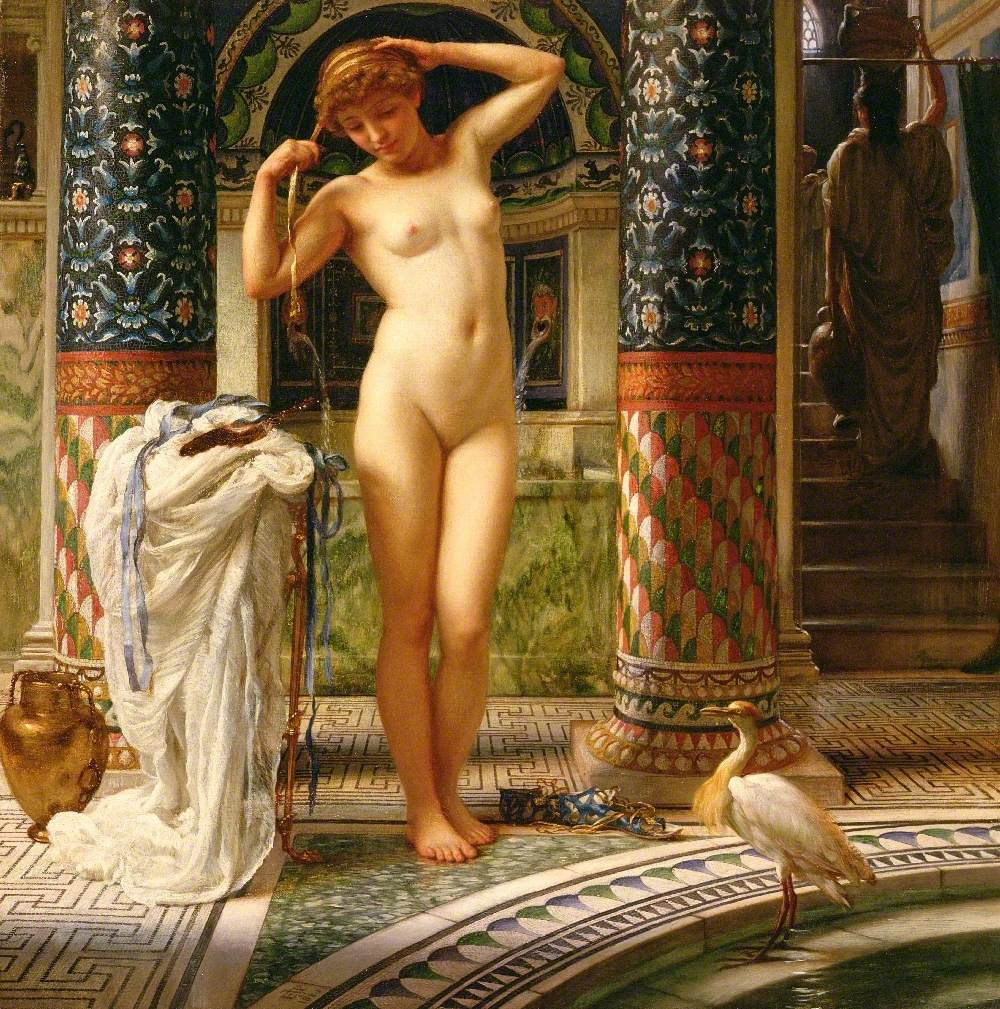
Diadumenè (1884)

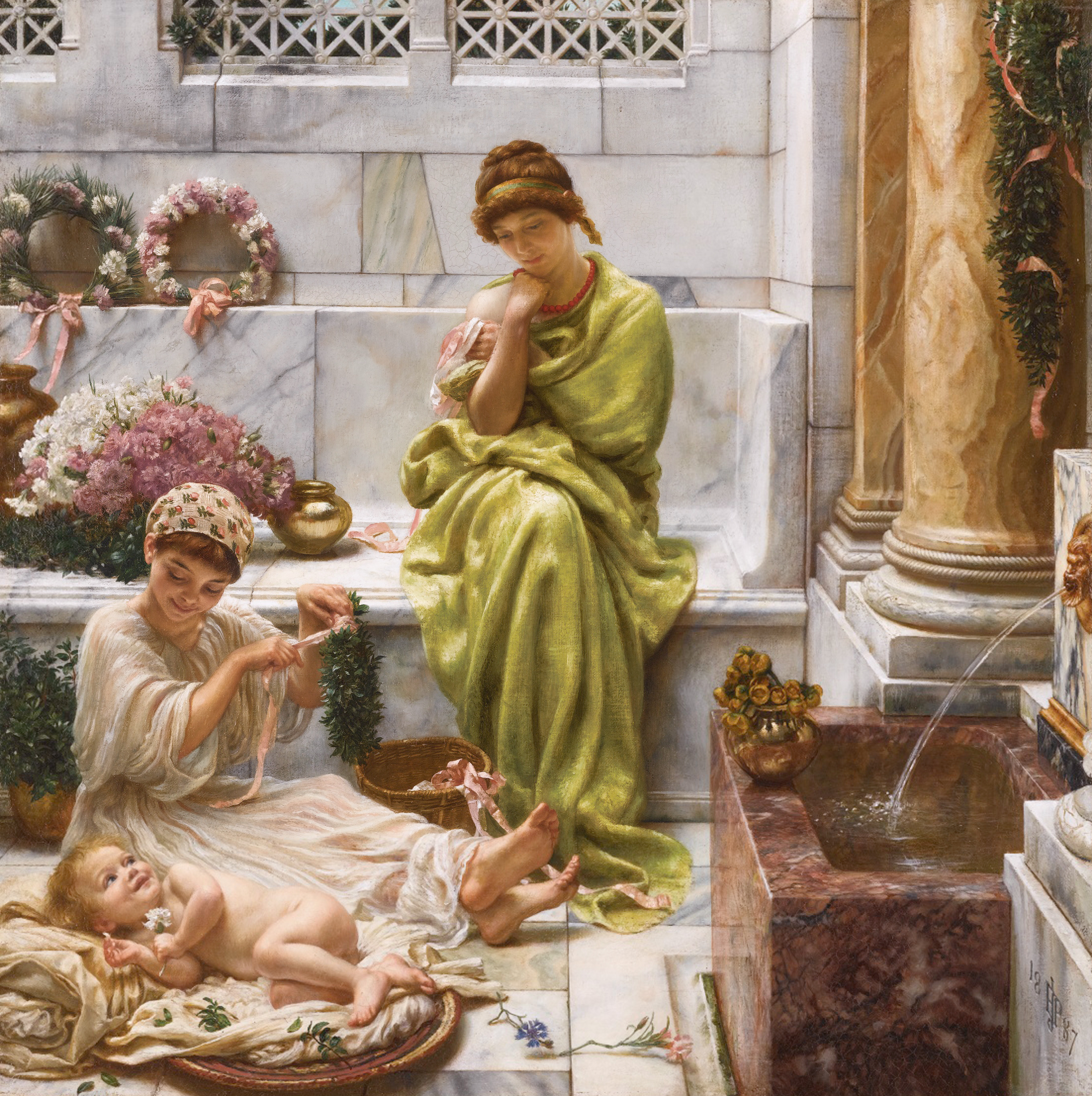
Corner of the Marketplace (1887)

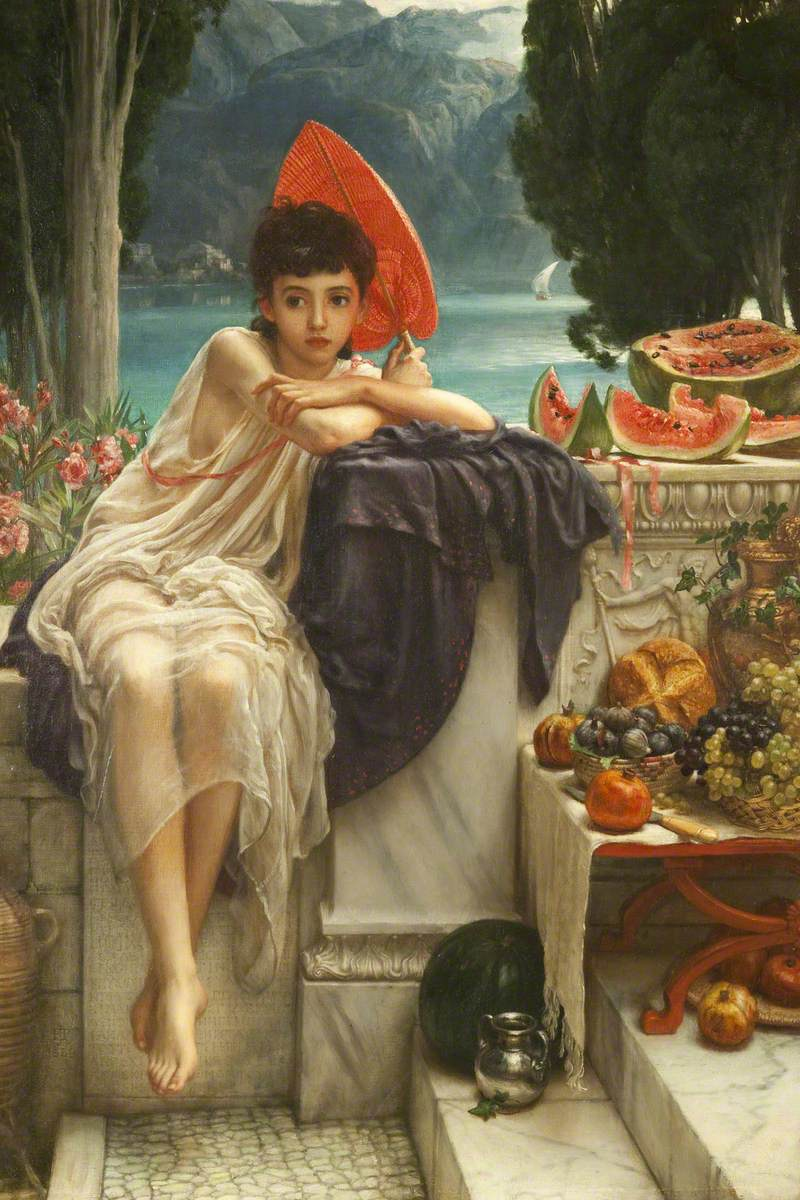
On the Temple Steps (1889)

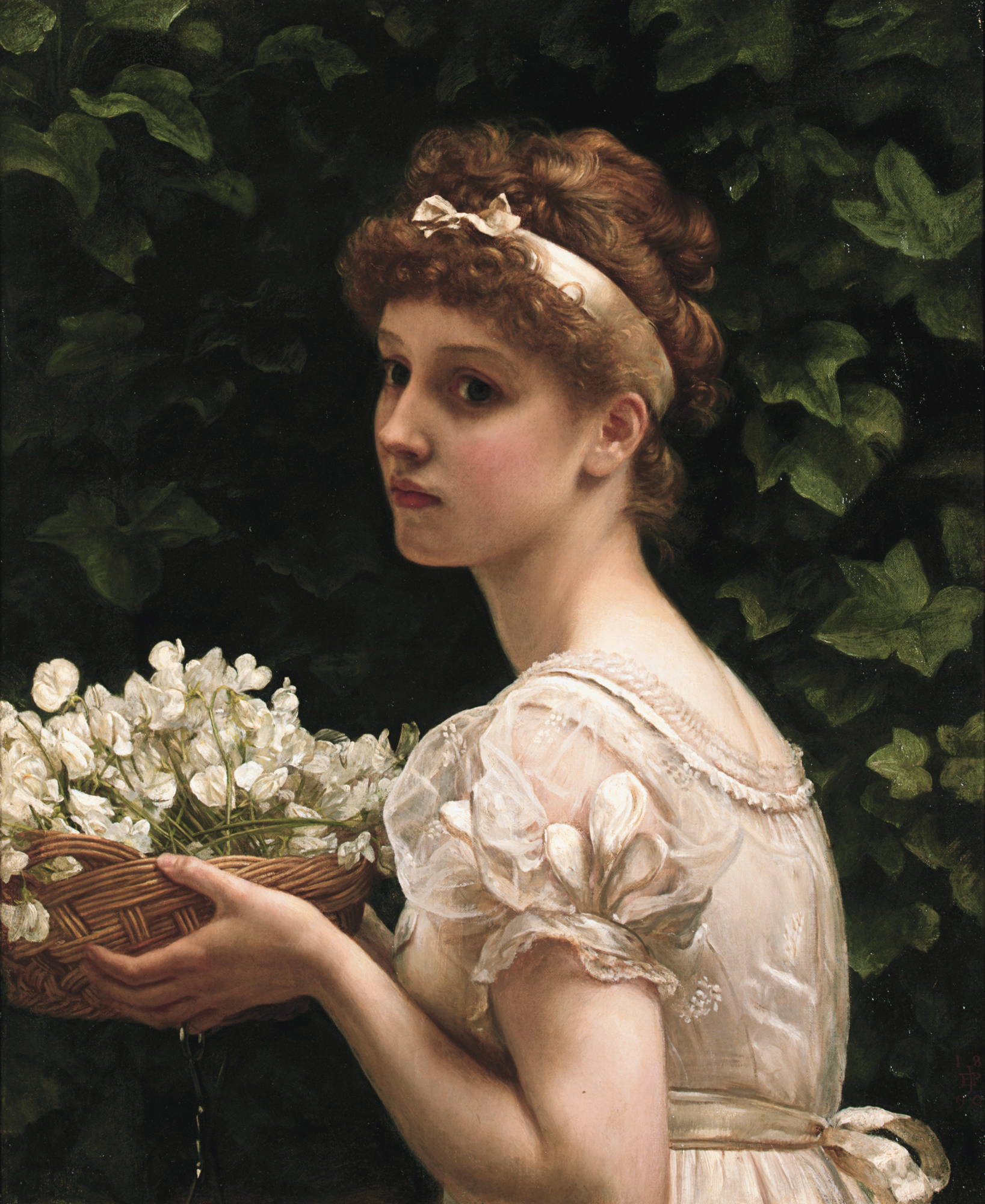
Pea Blossoms (1890)

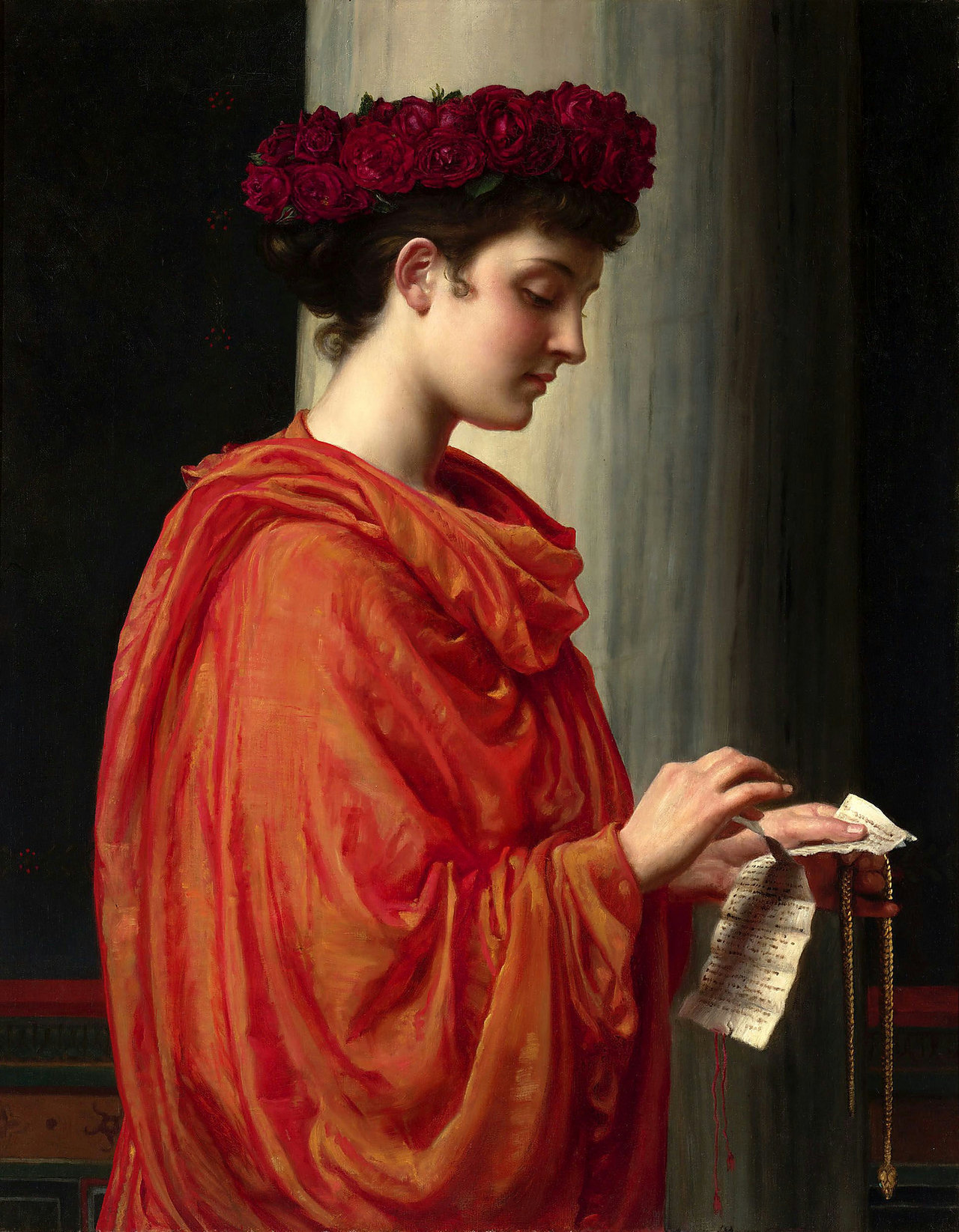
Barine (1894)

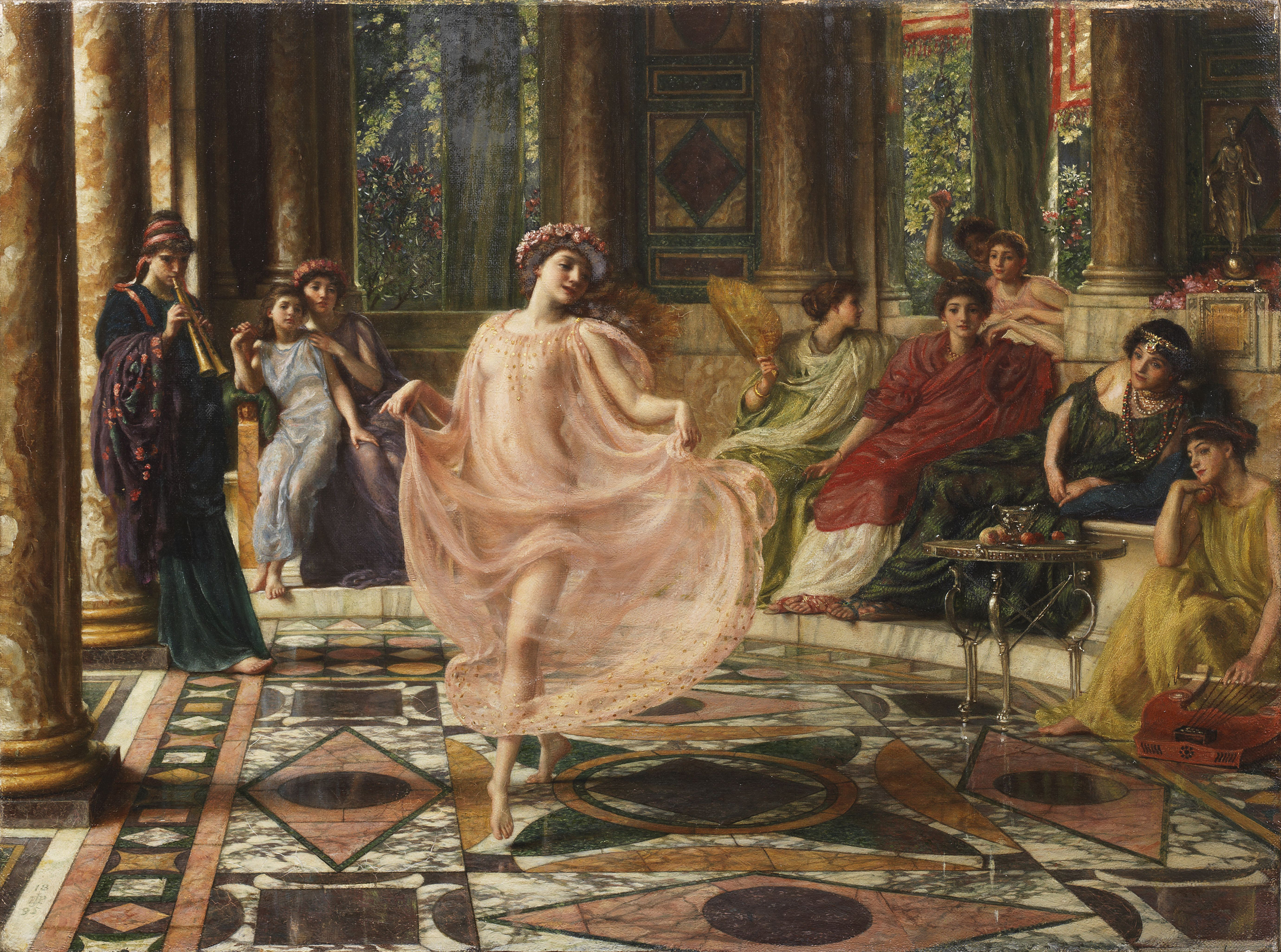
The Ionian Dance (1895)

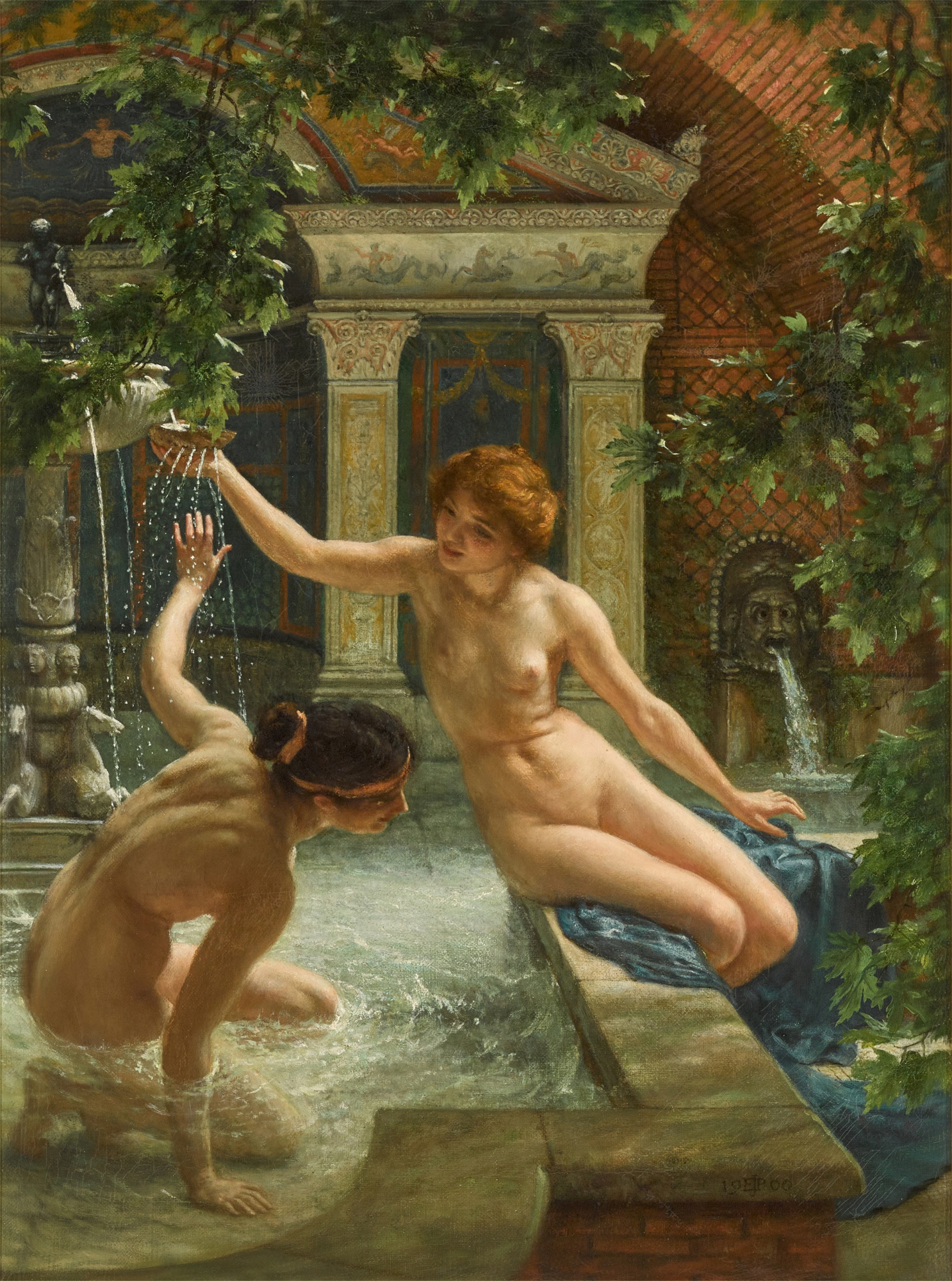
Water Babies (1900)

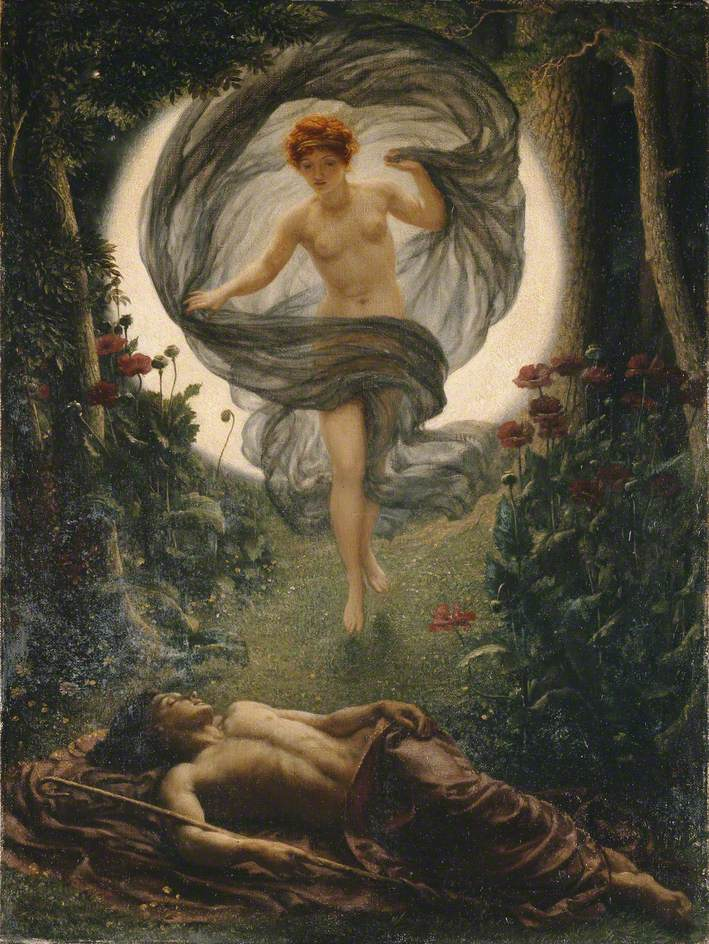
The Vision of Endymion (1902)

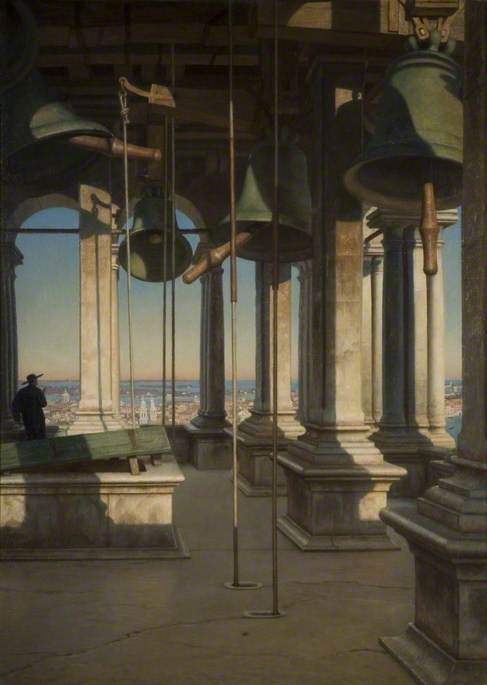
The Bells of Saint Mark's Venice (1903)

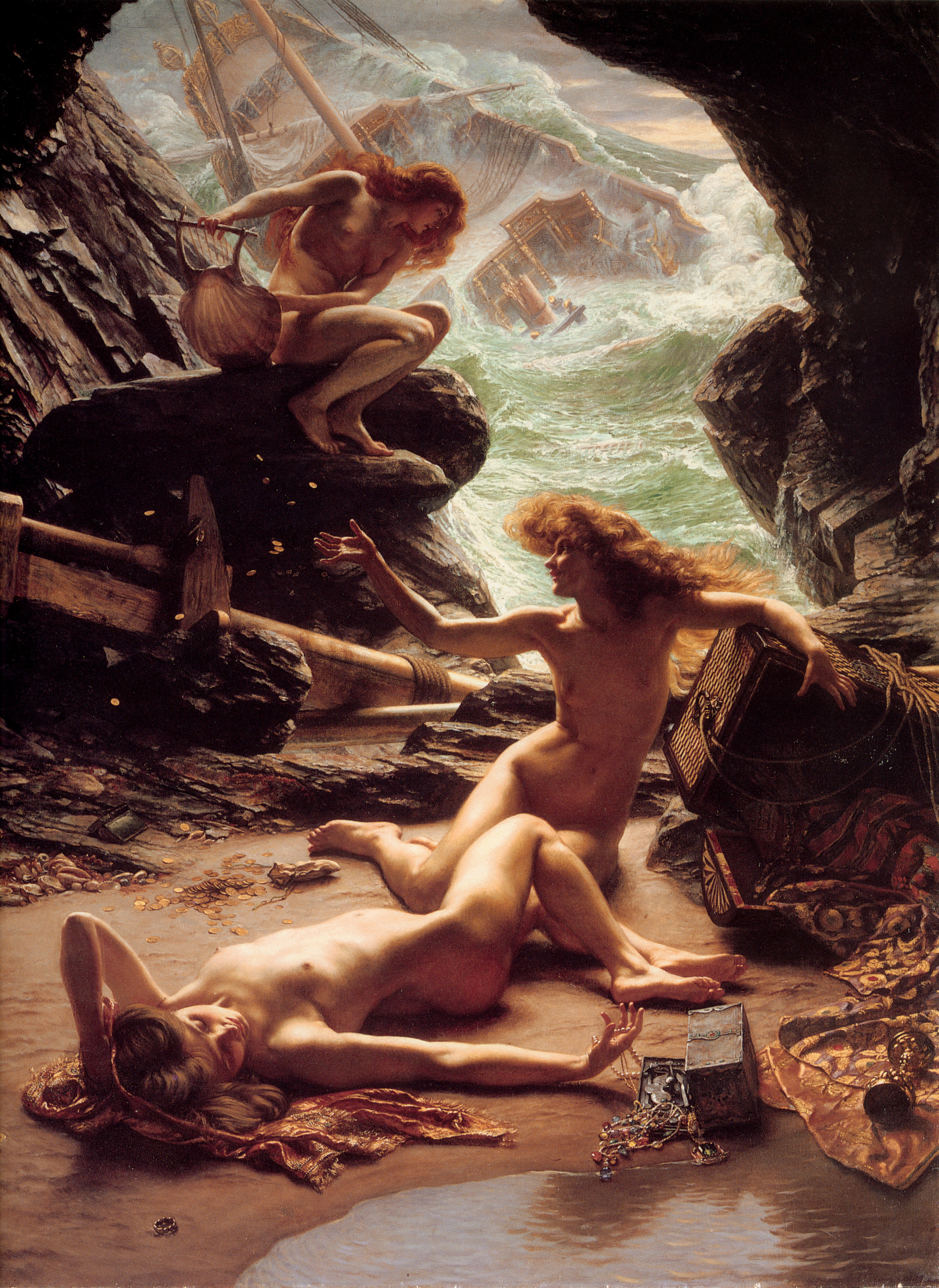
The Cave of the Storm Nymphs (1903)

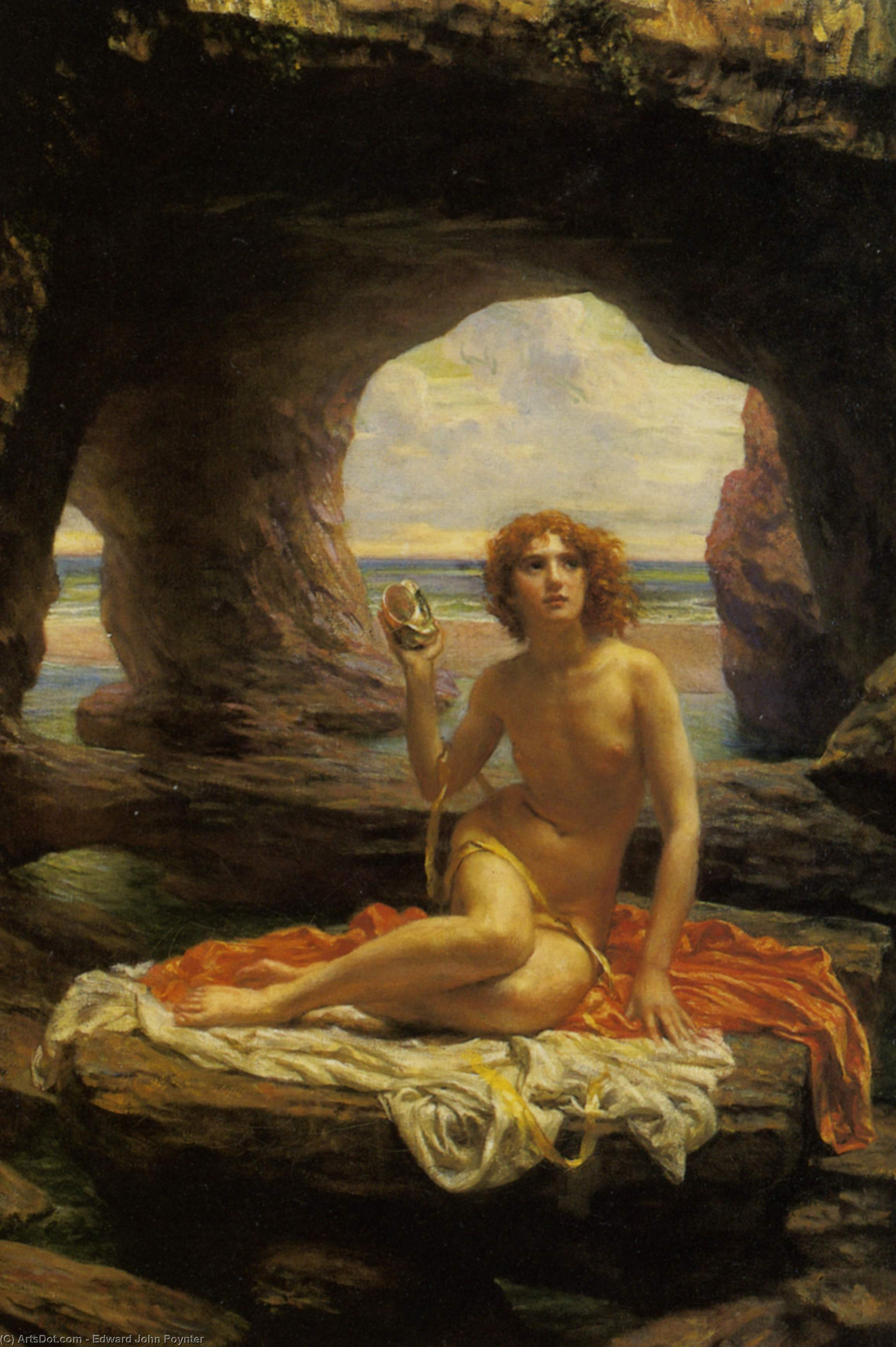
At Low Tide (1914)

=== Stained glass ===
Early in his career, Poynter designed some works in stained glass. Parts of the original designs were sometimes re-used in later windows.

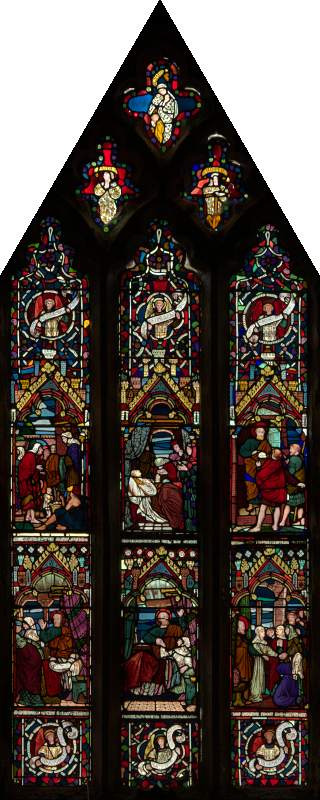
Stained-glass window designed by Edward Poynter, showing six scenes from the life of Dorcas, on the west side of the tower of St Ia's Church, St Ives.

=== Written works ===
- Ten lectures on art. London: Chapman and Hall. 1880.
- German, Flemish and Dutch painting. Scribner and Welford. 1881. with Buxton, H. J. Wilmot (co-author)
- Classic and Italian painting. London: S. Low, Marston, Searle, & Rivington. 1890. with Percy Head (co-author)

Cultural offices
Preceded by Sir John Everett Millais	President of the Royal Academy; 1896–1918	Succeeded by Sir Aston Webb
Baronetage of the United Kingdom
New creation	Baronet (of Albert Gate); 1902–1919	Succeeded by Ambrose Poynter
