= 1874 in art =

Events from the year 1874 in art.

== Events ==
- February–March – A memorial exhibition of drawings and watercolors by Viktor Hartmann is held at the Imperial Academy of Arts in Saint Petersburg and inspires his friend Modest Mussorgsky to compose the piano suite Pictures at an Exhibition.
- April 15 – May 15 – First exhibition by the Société Anonyme Coopérative des Artistes Peintres, Sculpteurs, Graveurs is held in a private studio (belonging to Nadar) outside the official Paris Salon; on April 25, Louis Leroy reviewing the exhibition in the French satirical newspaper Le Charivari under the heading "L'Exposition des impressionistes", coins the term "Impressionism" to describe the movement, with particular reference to Claude Monet's Impression, Sunrise (1872), first exhibited here and in May sold to the businessman and collector Ernest Hoschedé. Renoir exhibits six works, including La Loge. The only female exhibitor is Berthe Morisot.
- May 4 – The Royal Academy Exhibition of 1874 opens at Burlington House in London
- Summer – Monet visits Amsterdam.
- August 22 – English illustrator Helen Paterson marries Irish poet and editor William Allingham and becomes a watercolourist under her married name.
- c. December 19 – Monet begins painting his Snow at Argenteuil series.
- December 22 – Berthe Morisot marries Eugène, brother of Édouard Manet, at Passy.
- Goya's Black Paintings are transferred to canvas.

== Works ==
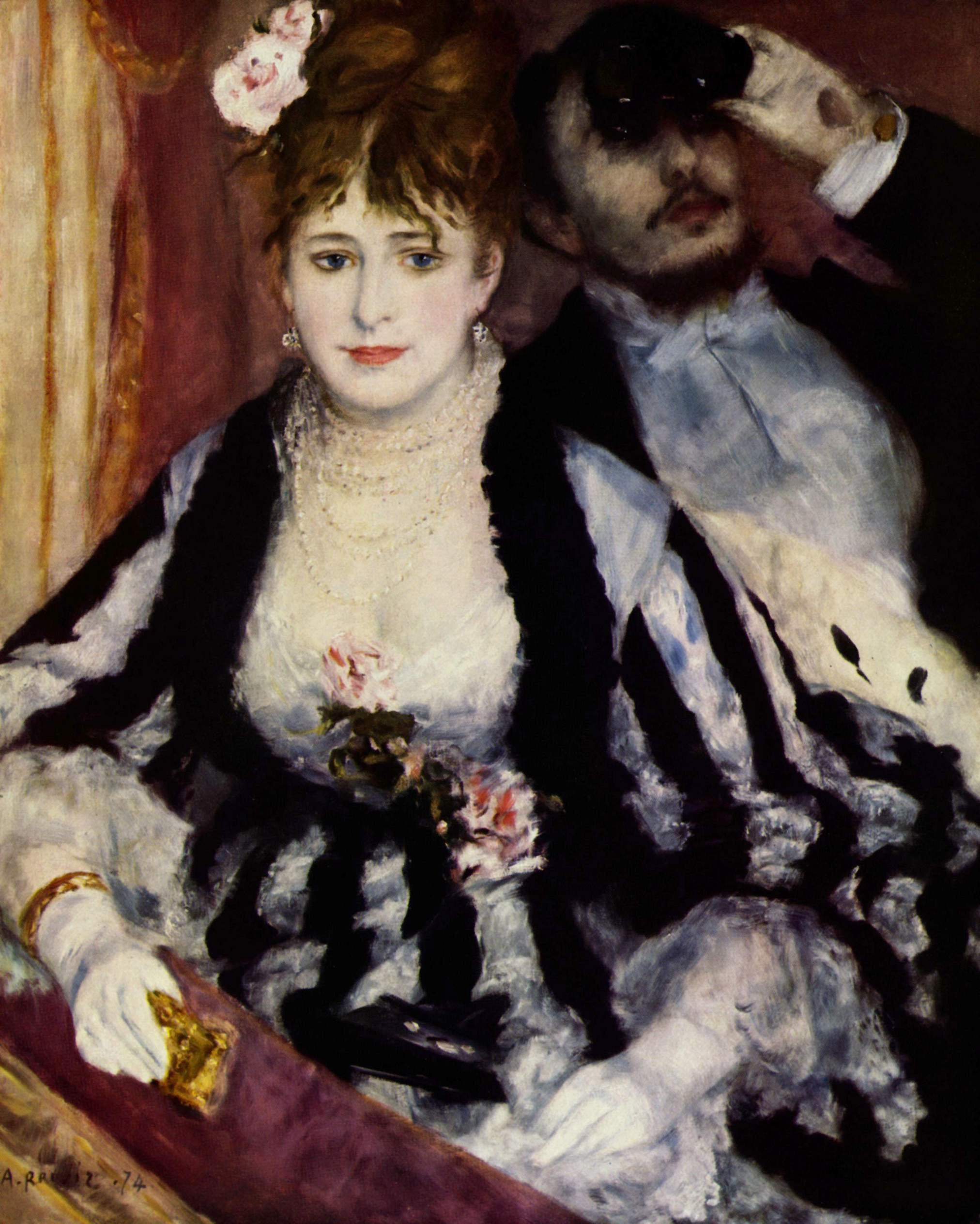
Renoir – La Loge

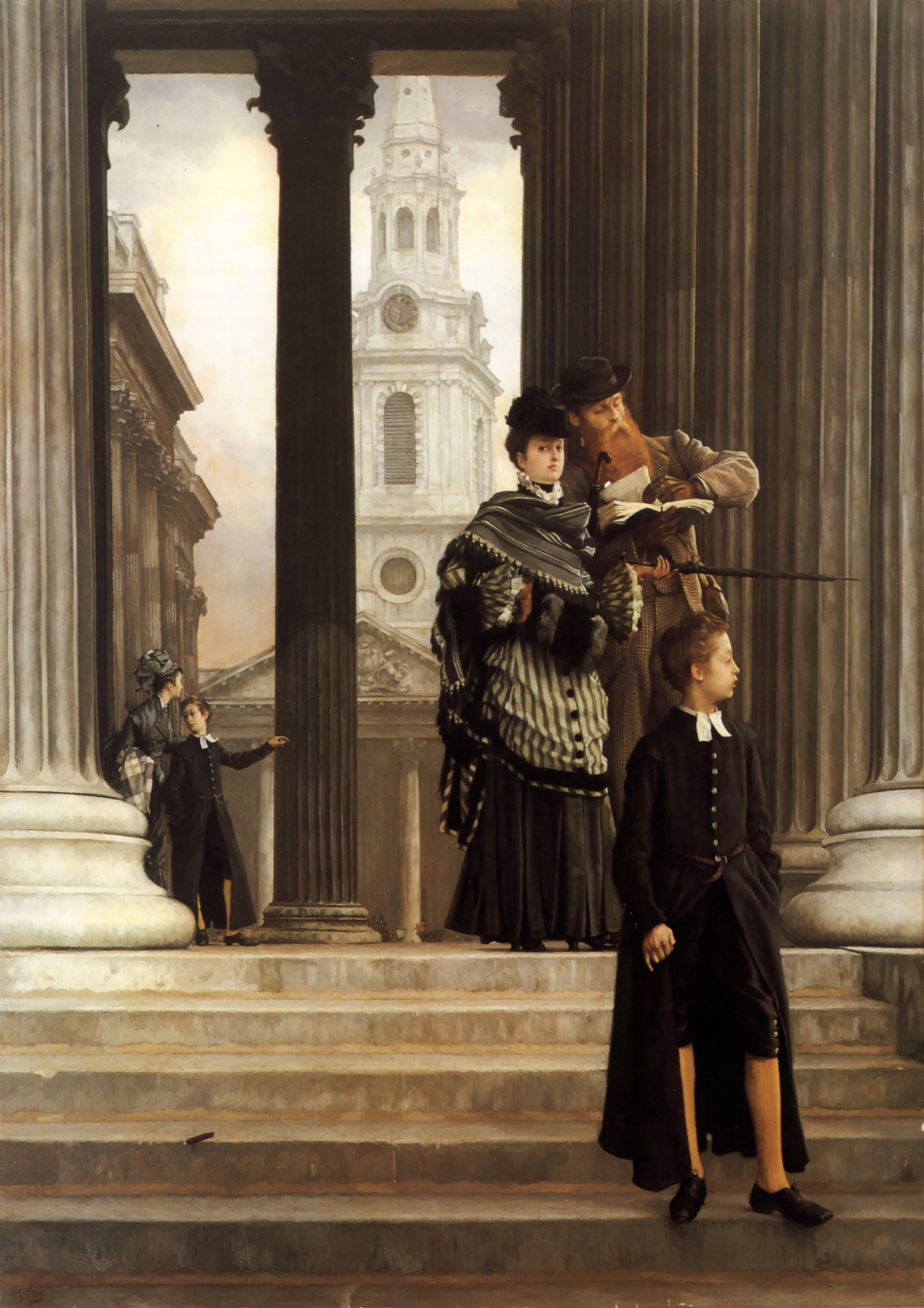
James Tissot – London Visitors

- April 26 – Confederate Obelisk (Atlanta)
- Peter Nicolai Arbo
  - Dagr
  - Self-portrait
- Thomas Jones Barker – Balaklava – One of the Six Hundred
- Caroline Shawk Brooks – Dreaming Iolanthe (butter sculpture; first version)
- Ford Madox Brown – Cromwell on his Farm
- Edward Burne-Jones – The Beguiling of Merlin
- Louis Buvelot – Macedon Ranges
- Philip Hermogenes Calderon – The Queen of the Tournament
- Eyre Crowe – The Dinner Hour, Wigan
- Edgar Degas – The Dance Class
- Lowes Cato Dickinson – Gladstone's Cabinet of 1868
- Giuseppe De Nittis – How Cold It Is!
- Pere Borrell del Caso – Escaping Criticism
- Thomas Eakins – Portrait of Professor Benjamin H. Rand
- John Faed – The Warning Before Flodden
- Henri Fantin-Latour – Still Life with Pansies (Metropolitan Museum of Art, New York)
- Luke Fildes – Applicants for Admission to a Casual Ward
- Emmanuel Frémiet – Joan of Arc (formerly in the Place des Pyramides, Paris)
- Walter Greaves – Old Battersea Bridge
- Armand Guillaumin – La Seine (Metropolitan Museum of Art)
- Winslow Homer – Farmer with a Pitch Fork
- Vilhelm Kyhn – Sildig Sommeraften ved Himmelbjærget ("Late Summer Evening near Himmelbjerget")
- Alphonse Legros – The Tinker
- Édouard Manet
  - Boating (Metropolitan Museum of Art)
  - Argenteuil
  - Claude Monet Painting in his Studio
- Antonin Mercié – Gloria Victis (sculpture)
- John Everett Millais – Miss Eveleen Tennant
- Jean-François Millet - Haystacks: Autumn
- Claude Monet – The Railway Bridge at Argenteuil
- Albert Joseph Moore – Shells
- Thomas Moran – Chasm of the Colorado
- Berthe Morisot – The Butterfly Hunt
- John Pettie – Jacobites, 1745
- Camille Pissarro – Portrait of Paul Cézanne
- Illarion Pryanishnikov – Episode in the War of 1812
- Pierre-Auguste Renoir
  - Danseuse
  - La Loge
  - La Parisienne
- Dante Gabriel Rossetti
  - The Damsel of the Sanct Grael or Holy Grail
  - Proserpine (Tate Britain)
- Alfred Sisley – Misty Morning
- James Tissot
  - The Ball on Shipboard
  - London Visitors
  - Waiting for the Ferry at the Falcon Tavern
  - On the Thames (approximate date)
- James McNeill Whistler
  - Miss Cicely Alexander
  - Westminster Bridge

== Births ==
- February 23 – Arnold Friedman, American modernist painter (died 1946)
- March 9 – John Duncan Fergusson, Scottish Colourist painter (died 1961)
- March 23 – Henri Manguin, French Fauvist painter (died 1949)
- April 7 – Frederick Carl Frieseke, American-born painter (died 1939)
- May 11 – Einar Jónsson, Icelandic sculptor (died 1954)
- July 24 – Félix Pissarro, French-born painter (died 1897)
- July 28 – Joaquín Torres García, Uruguayan painter (died 1949)
- October 16 – Otto Mueller, Silesian painter (died 1930)
- October 21 – Charles R. Knight, American animal painter (died 1953)
- November 9 – Julio Romero de Torres, Andalusian painter of female nudes (died 1930)
- December 18 – Frank O. Salisbury, English portrait and official painter (died 1962)
- date unknown
  - Mabel Esplin, English stained-glass artist (died 1921)
  - Dorothea Sharp, English painter (died 1955)

== Deaths ==
- January 29 – John Christian Schetky, Scottish-born marine painter (born 1778)
- April 19 – Owen Jones, British architect, interior designer and pioneer of chromolithography (born 1809)
- April 20 – Alexander Hunter Murray, fur trader in Canada and artist (born 1818/1819)
- May 2 – William Langenheim, German-born American photographer (born 1807)
- May 5 – Marc-Charles-Gabriel Gleyre, Swiss painter in France (born 1806)
- June 14 – Julien-Léopold Boilly, French draughtsman and watercolorist (born 1796)
- July 25 – Edward Troye, Swiss-born American equine painter (born 1808)
- August 27 – John Henry Foley, Irish sculptor (born 1818)
- October 28 – William Henry Rinehart, American sculptor in Italy (born 1825)
- November 21 – Marià Fortuny, Catalan-Spanish painter in Italy (born 1838)
- December 6 – Gustaf Wappers, Flemish painter in France (born 1803)
- date unknown – Henry Bryan Ziegler, British landscape and portrait painter (born 1798)
