= Winter Fuel =

Painting by John Everett Millais

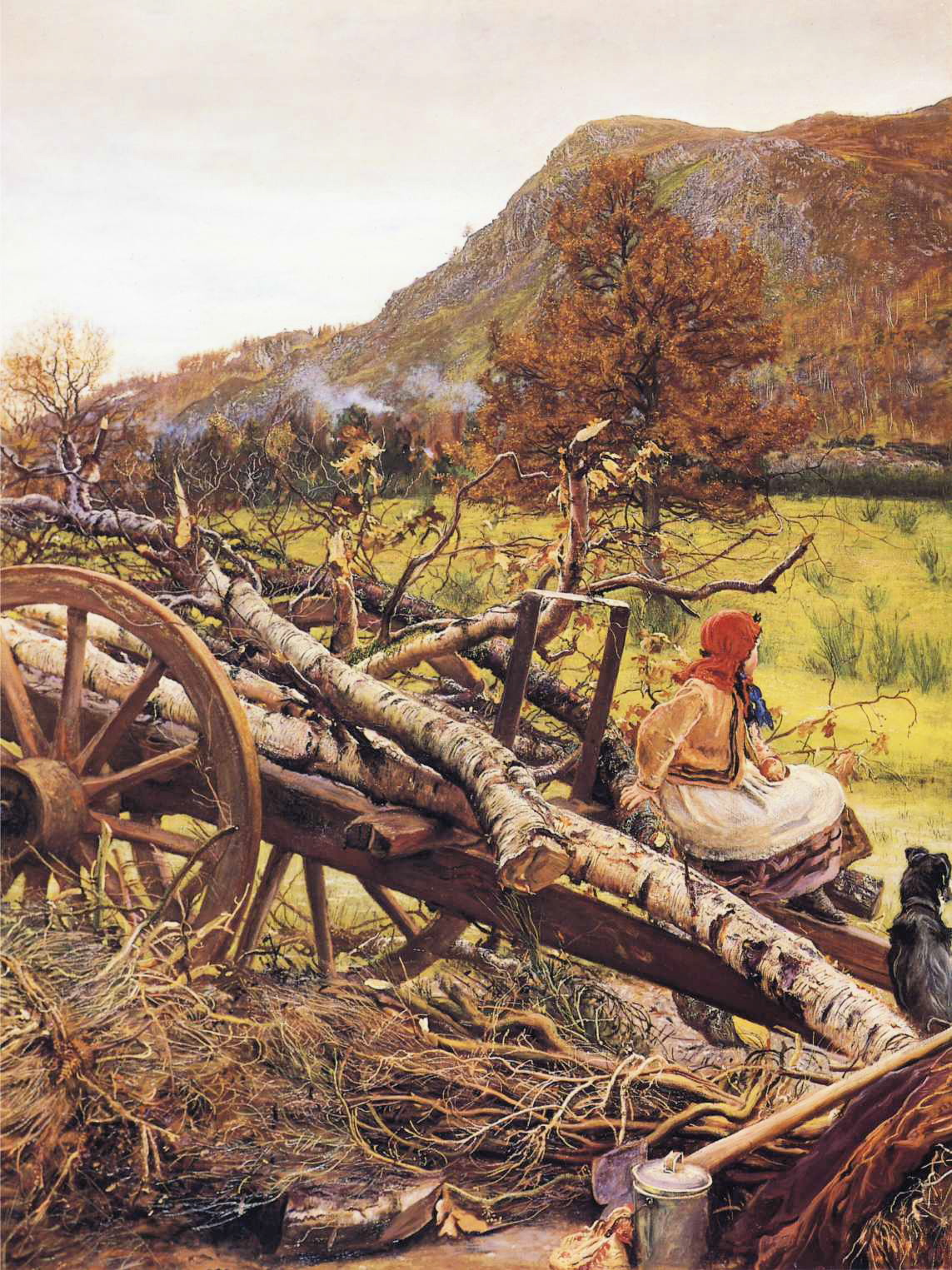
- Artist: John Everett Millais
- Year: 1873
- Type: Oil on canvas, genre painting
- Dimensions: 194.5 cm × 149.5 cm (76.6 in × 58.9 in)
- Location: Manchester Art Gallery, Greater Manchester

Winter Fuel is an 1873 oil painting by the British artist John Everett Millais. It mixes elements of genre painting and landscape. A woodsman's young daughter daughter sits on a cart and surveys her surroundings. It was produced at Birnam Hill near Perth.

Millais had been a prominent member of the Pre-Raphaelite Brotherhood, but was transitioning to producing more academic syle rooted in the Romanticism of earlier in the century. The painting was displayed at the Royal Academy Exhibition of 1874 held at Burlington House in London. Today it is part of the collection of the Manchester Art Gallery, having been received in 1897 as a gift.

== See also ==
- List of paintings by John Everett Millais

== Bibliography ==
- Barlow, Paul. Time Present and Time Past: The Art of John Everett Millais. Routledge, 2017.
- Riding, Christine. John Everett Millais. Harry N. Abrams, 2006.
- Treuherz, Julian. Pre-Raphaelite Paintings from the Manchester City Art Gallery. Lund Humphries, 1980.
