= Waiting for the Ferry at the Falcon Tavern =

Painting by James Tissot

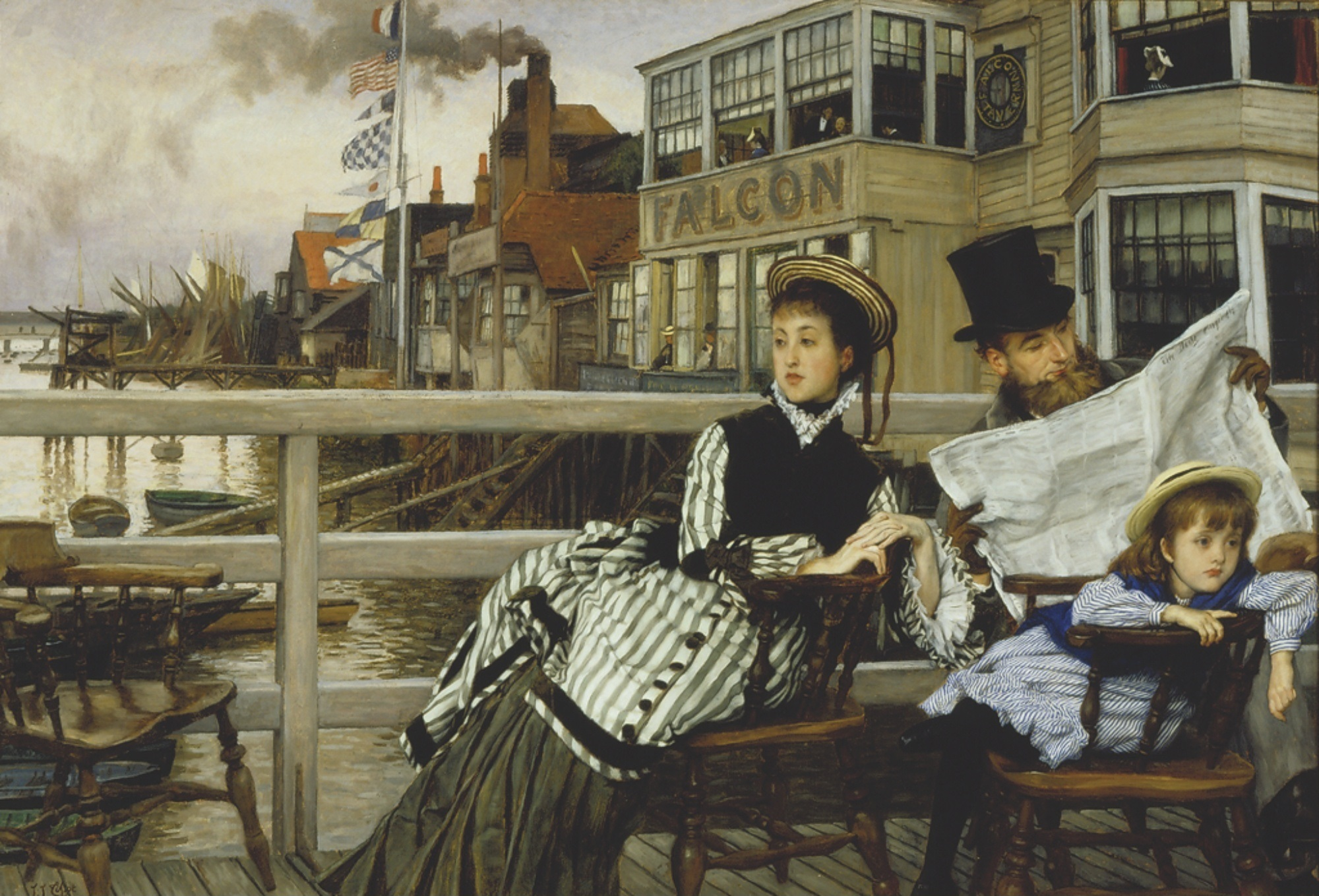
- Artist: James Tissot
- Year: 1874
- Type: Oil on canvas, genre painting
- Dimensions: 66.7 cm × 97 cm (26.3 in × 38 in)
- Location: Speed Art Museum, Louisville

Waiting for the Ferry at the Falcon Tavern is an oil on canvas genre painting by the French artist James Tissot, from 1874. It is held at the Speed Art Museum, in Louisville.

== History and description ==
It was produced during Tissot's time in Britain, where he had moved following the outbreak of the Franco-Prussian War. It depicts a scene that takes place at the dock at the rear of the Falcon Tavern in Gravesend on the River Thames. A couple, with a little daughter, is waiting for the arrival of the ferry. The man reads a newspaper while he waits. Mother and daughter are both seated, but they look into opposite directions. The Falcon Tavern can be seen in the background, and other buildings, including one with a chimney, stand to the left.

Tissot produced two later, differing pictures of the same scene, around 1878, both of which feature Kathleen Newton as the woman in the composition.

== Bibliography ==
- Ash, Russell James Tissot. Pavilion, 1992.
- Kern, Stephen. Eyes of Love: The Gaze in English and French Paintings and Novels, 1840-1900. Reaction Books, 1996.
