= The Warning Before Flodden =

Painting by John Faed

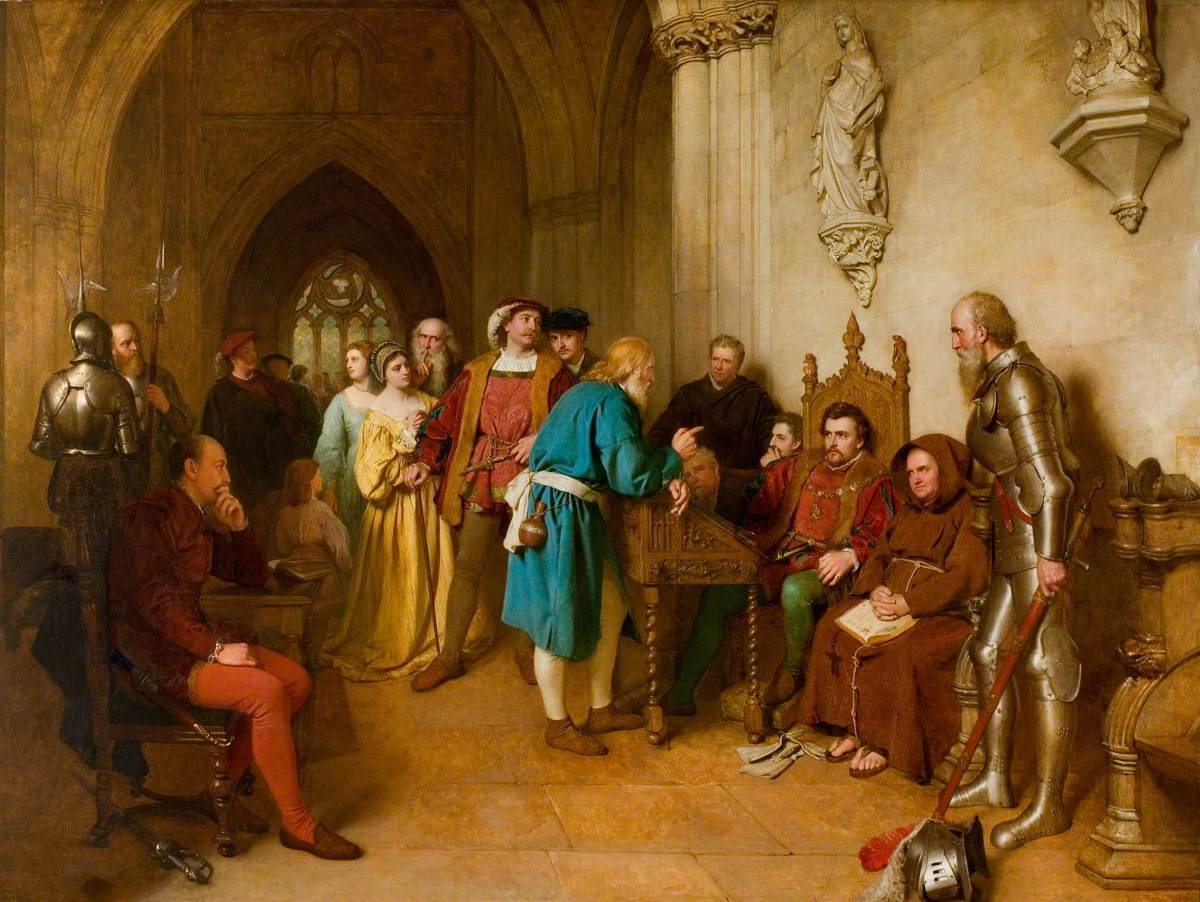
- Artist: John Faed
- Year: 1874
- Type: Oil on canvas, history painting
- Dimensions: 137 cm × 185 cm (54 in × 73 in)
- Location: Wolverhampton Art Gallery, Wolverhampton

The Warning Before Flodden is an 1874 history painting by the British artist John Faed. It depicts a scene from Scottish history. Shortly before embarking on a massive invasion of England as part of the wider War of the League of Cambrai, the Scottish monarch James IV is confronted by a mysterious man in the chapel of Linlithgow Palace who warns him of his premonition of impending danger. On 9 September 1513 the Scottish Army suffered a heavy defeat at the Battle of Flodden and James himself was amongst the slain.

The painting was displayed at the Royal Academy Exhibition of 1874 held at Burlington House in London and again at the Society of Artists in Birmingham in 1875. It belonged to the building contractor and art collector Philip Horsman who in 1886 gave it to the Wolverhampton Art Gallery in Staffordshire.

== Bibliography ==
- McKerrow, Mary. The Faeds: A Biography. Canongate, 1982.
- Roe, Sonia & Ellis, Andrew. Oil Paintings in Public Ownership in Staffordshire. Public Catalogue Foundation, 2007.
