= The Dinner Hour, Wigan =

Painting by Eyre Crowe

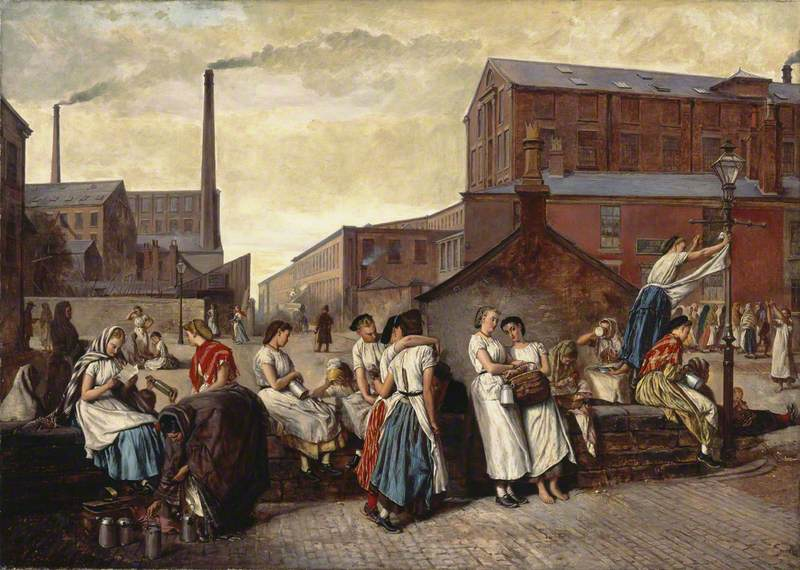
- Artist: Eyre Crowe
- Year: 1874
- Type: Oil on canvas, genre painting
- Dimensions: 76.3 cm × 107 cm (30.0 in × 42 in)
- Location: Manchester Art Gallery, Greater Manchester

The Dinner Hour, Wigan is an oil painting on canvas by the British artist Eyre Crowe, from 1874. It shows female factory workers eating their dinner during their lunchtime break in Wigan in Lancashire. A genre painting it depicts a scene of everyday life in the Industrial North during the Victorian era outside a large cotton mill.

The painting was displayed at the Royal Academy Exhibition of 1874 held at Burlington House in London. Today it is part of the collection of Manchester Art Gallery, which acquired it in 1922.

== Bibliography ==
- Child, Danielle. Working Aesthetics: Labour, Art and Capitalism. Bloomsbury Publishing, 2019.
- Treuherz, Julia & Casteras, Susan P. . Hard Times: Social Realism in Victorian Art. Lund Humphries, 1987.
