= London Visitors =

Painting by James Tissot

- Toledo version
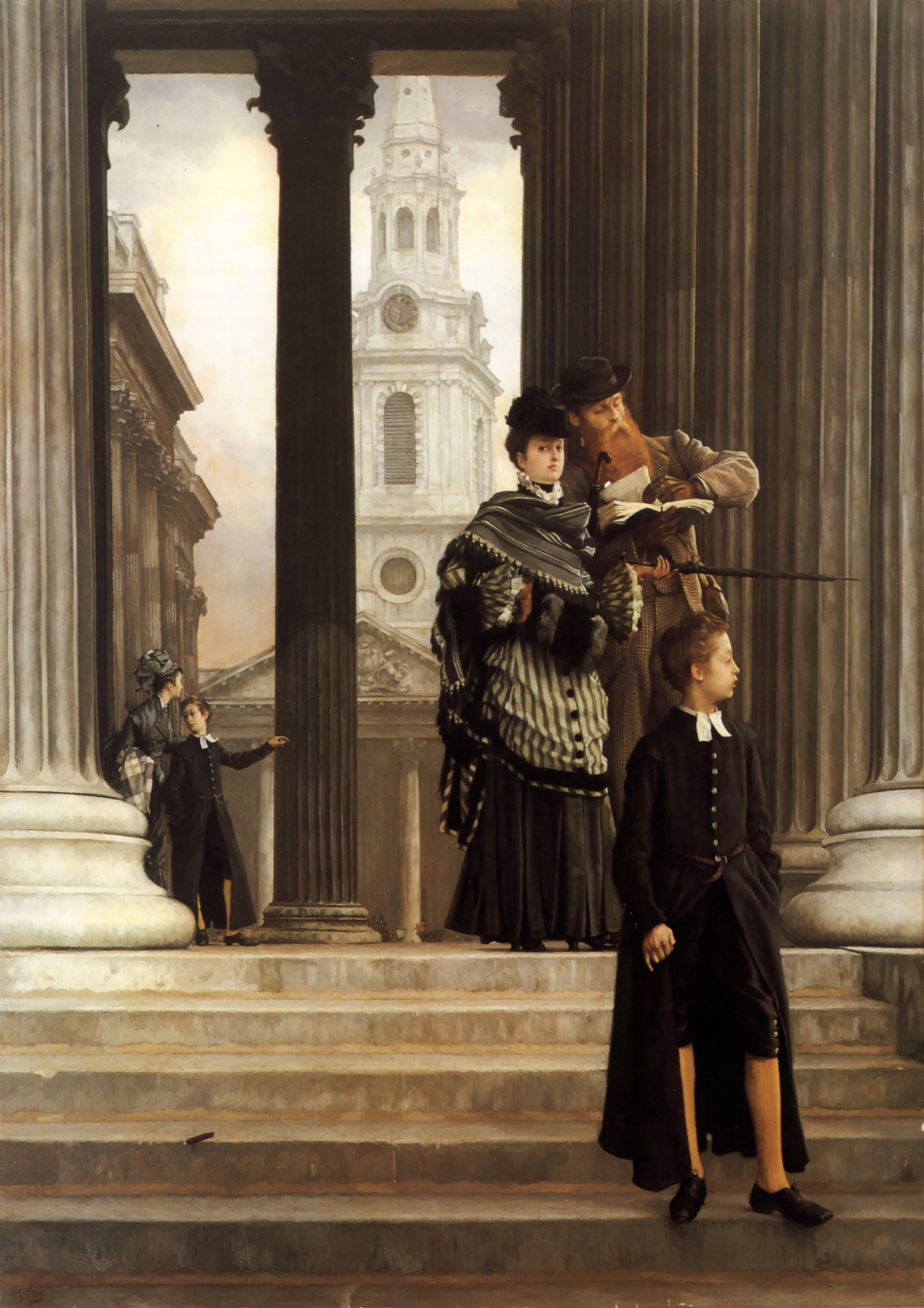
- Artist: James Tissot
- Year: 1874
- Type: Oil on canvas
- Dimensions: 160 cm × 114 cm (63 in × 45 in)
- Location: Toledo Museum of Art, Toledo, Ohio

London Visitors
- Milwaukee version
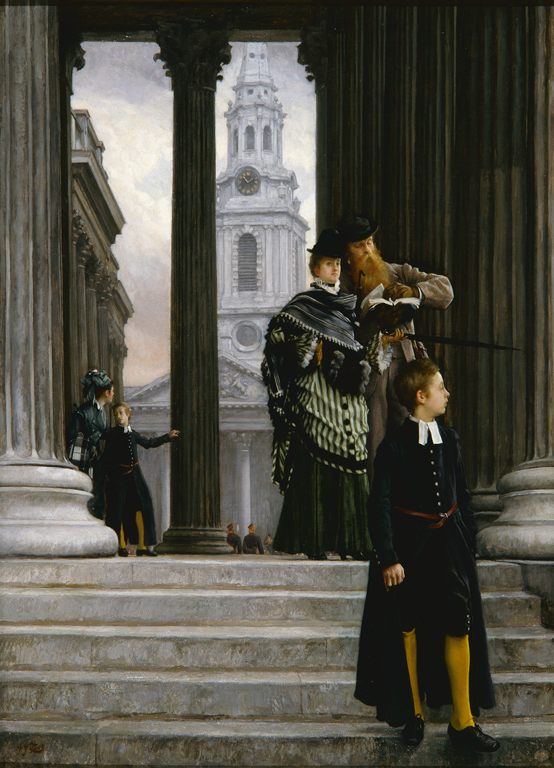
- Artist: James Tissot
- Year: 1874
- Medium: Oil on canvas
- Dimensions: 87 cm × 62.9 cm (34 1/4 in × 24 3/4 in)
- Location: Milwaukee Art Museum, Milwaukee

London Visitors is an oil on canvas genre painting by the French artist James Tissot, from 1874.

== History and description ==
Produced during his time in Britain, it depicts a number of visitors to the capital London shown at the portico entrance to the National Gallery on Trafalgar Square with St Martin-in-the-Fields in the background. A couple are depicted discussing what to see next, she points with an umbrella while he consults a guidebook. Also shown are two blue-coated boys from the charitable Christ’s Hospital School who sometimes acted as tour guides.

It was displayed at the Royal Academy Exhibition of 1874 at Burlington House. Today it is in the collection of the Toledo Museum of Art in Ohio. Another version of the painting is in the Milwaukee Art Museum. It was part of the collection of British-American businessman Frederick Layton.

== Bibliography ==
- Angiuli, Emanuela & Spurrell, Katy. De Nittis e Tissot: pittori della vita moderna. Skira, 2006.
- Marshall, Nancy Rose; Warner, Malcolm (1999). James Tissot: Victorian Life, Modern Love. Yale University Press.
- Mitchell, Sally, ed. (2011). Victorian Britain: An Encyclopedia. Routledge.
