= Royal Academy Exhibition of 1874 =

1874 art exhibition in London

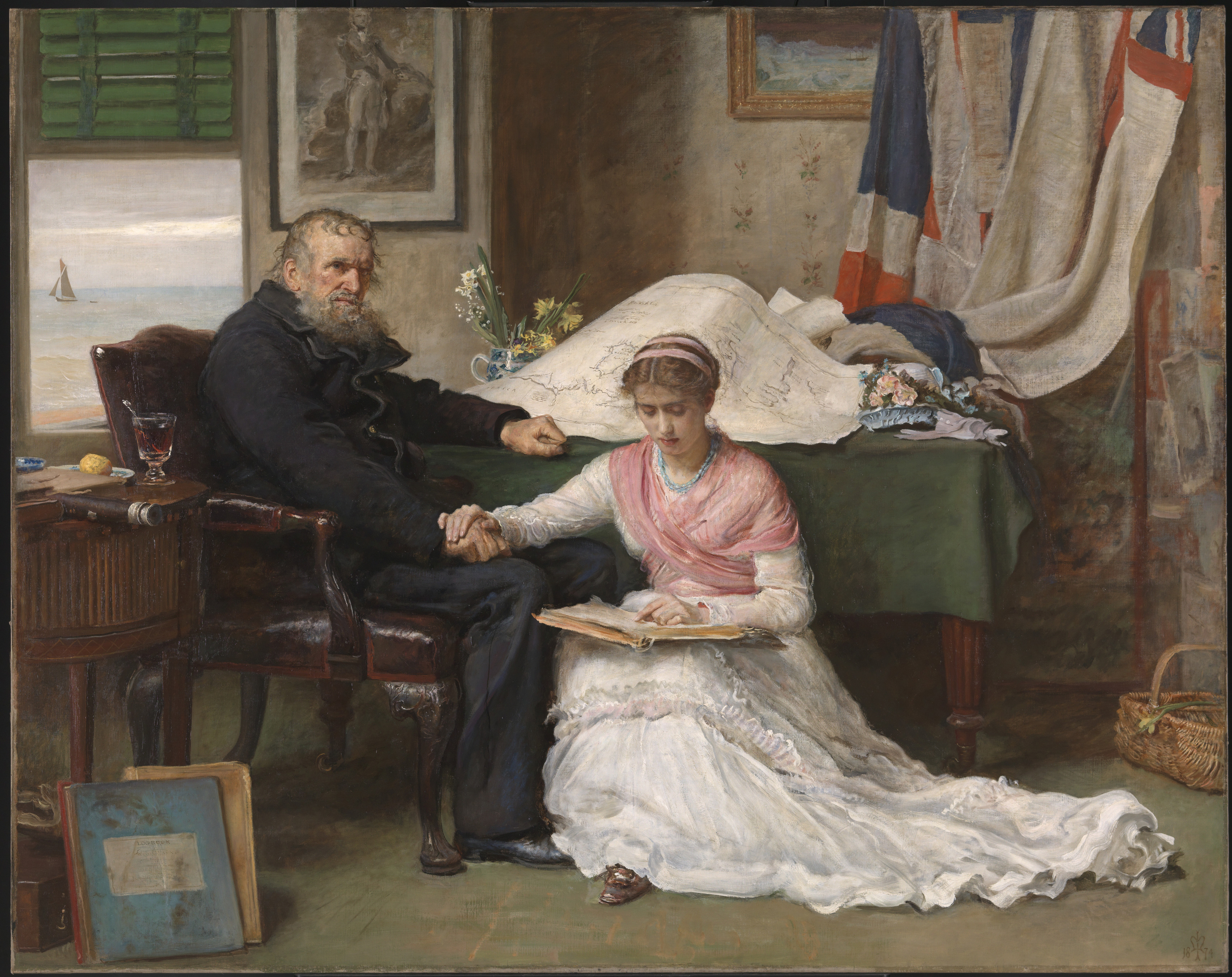
The North-West Passage by John Everett Millais

The Royal Academy Exhibition of 1874 was the hundred and sixth annual Summer Exhibition of the British Royal Academy of Arts which was held at Burlington House in London's Piccadilly between 4 May to 3 August 1874. It featured submissions from leading painters, sculptors and architects of the Victorian era.

The most discussed work of the exhibition was Elizabeth Thompson's The Roll Call. It shows a roll call of British soldiers in the aftermath of a battle of the Crimean War. It marked her breakthrough. Two of her previous submissions to the Royal Academy had been rejected and the third given an obscure hanging.

Another work that drew widespread notice was the Realist Applicants for Admission to a Casual Ward by Luke Fildes. The French artist James Tissot displayed his genre painting London Visitors.

It should not be confused with the Winter Exhibition, held earlier the same year, which featured a retrospective of the works of Edwin Landseer.

== Gallery ==
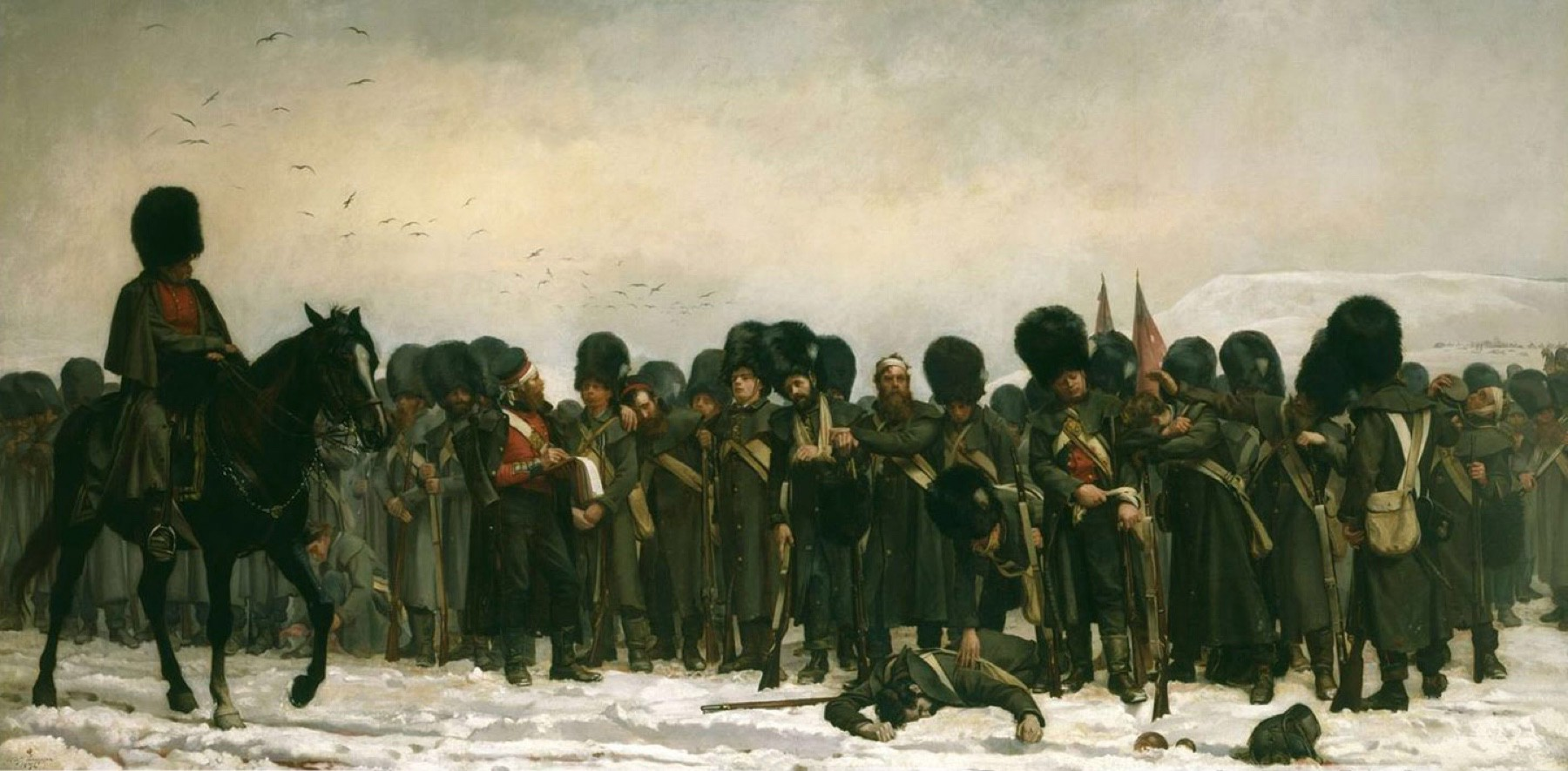
The Roll Call by Elizabeth Thompson

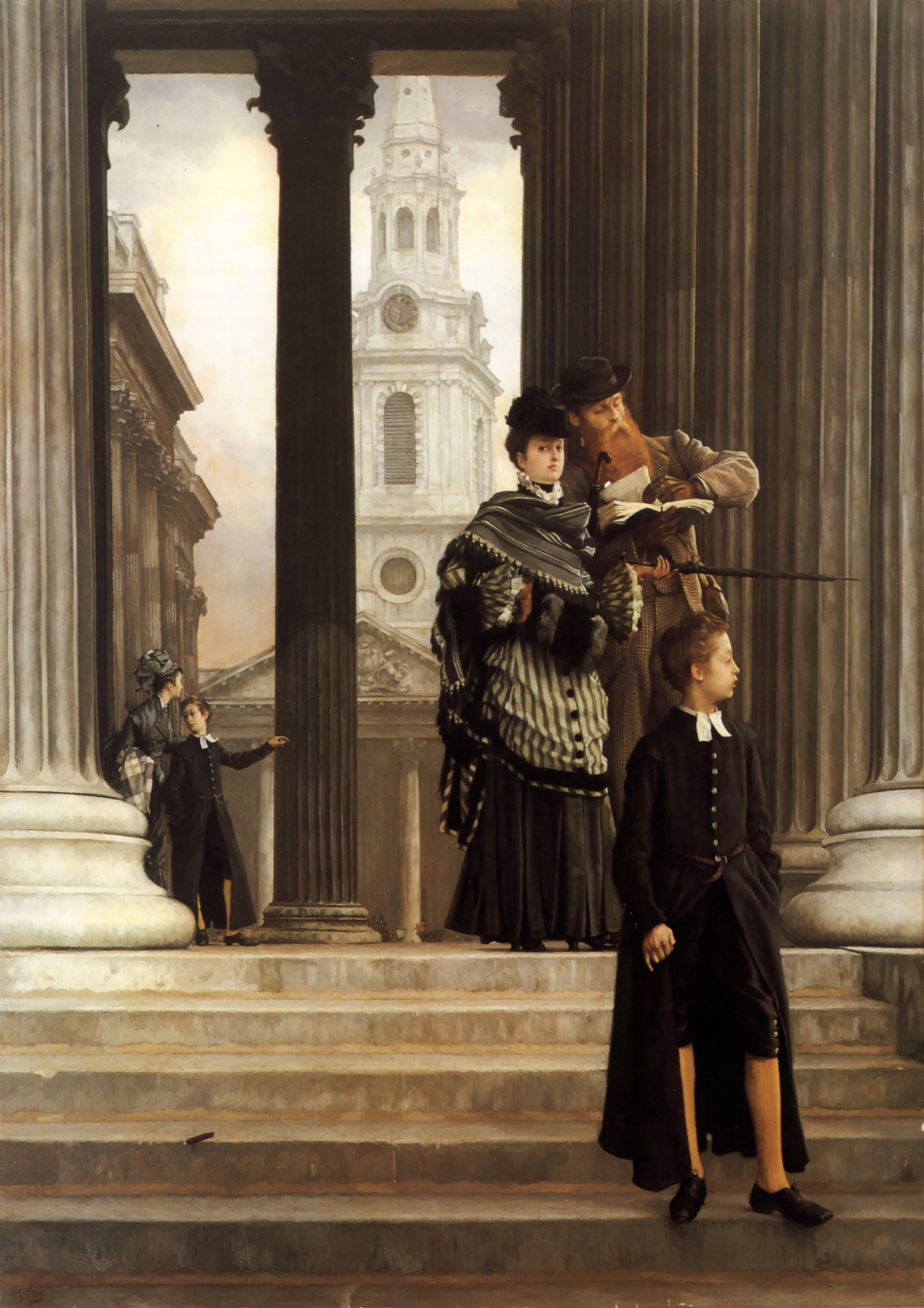
London Visitors by James Tissot

The Tinker by Alphonse Legros

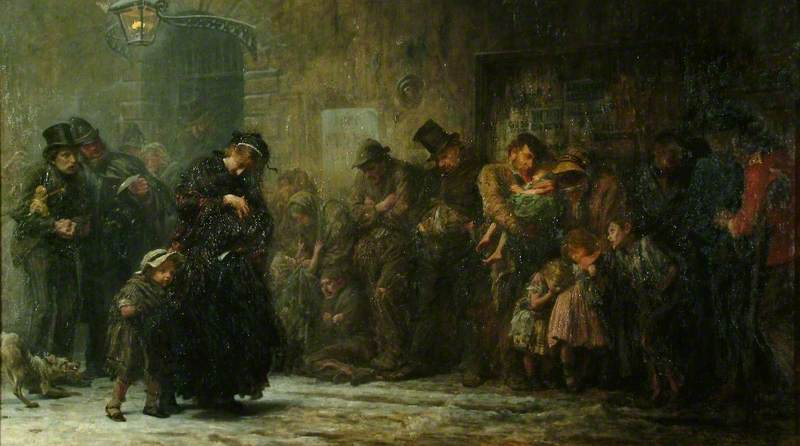
Applicants for Admission to a Casual Ward by Luke Fildes

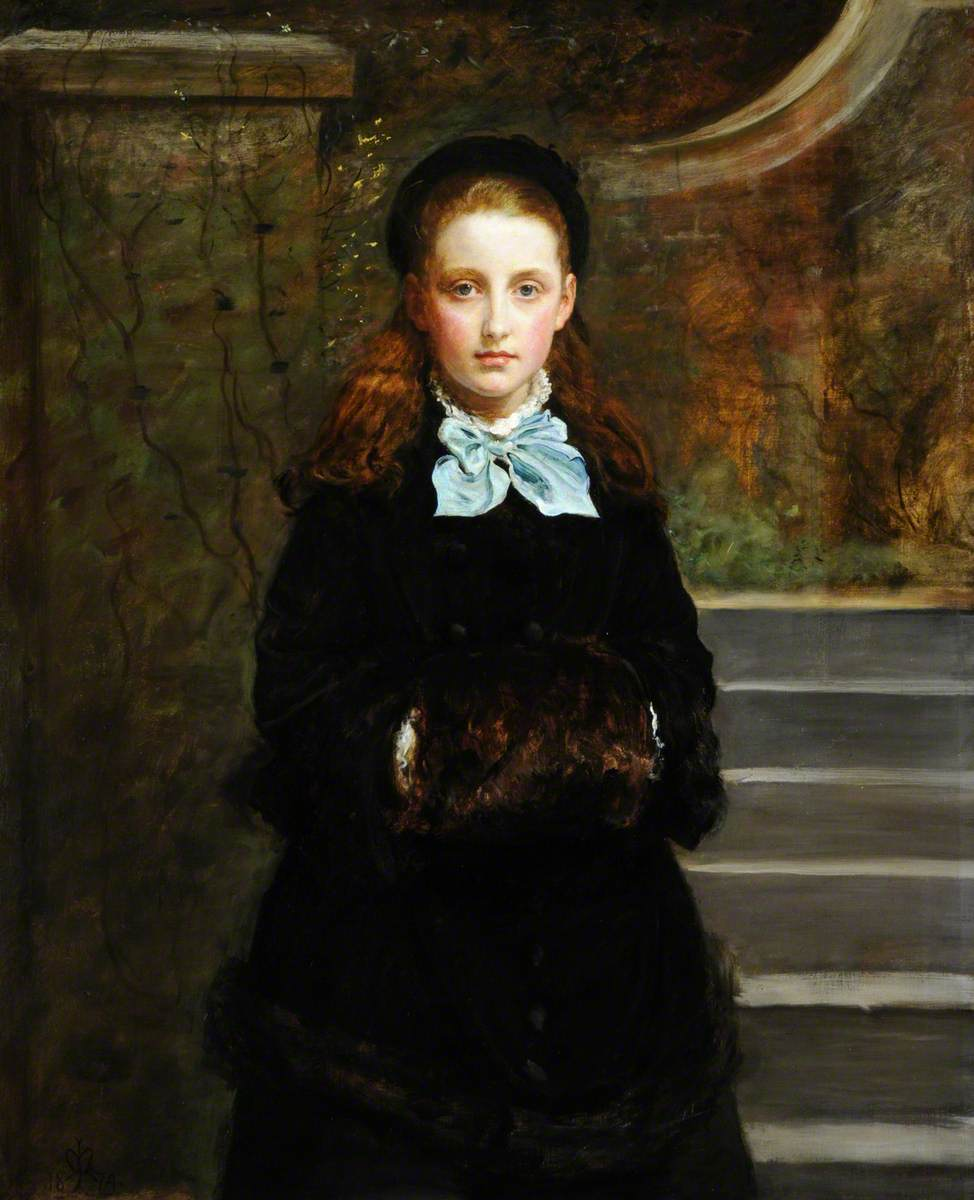
Picture of Health by John Everett Millais

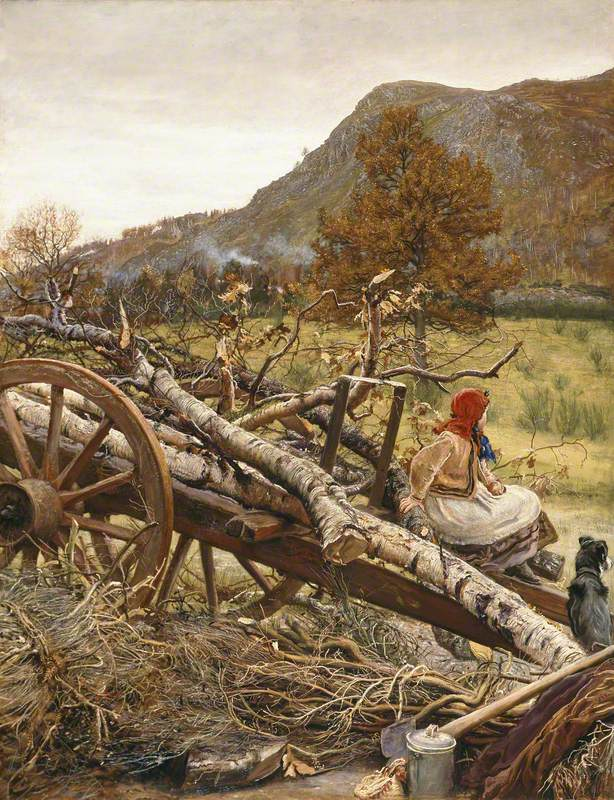
Winter Fuel by John Everett Millais

Scotch Firs by John Everett Millais

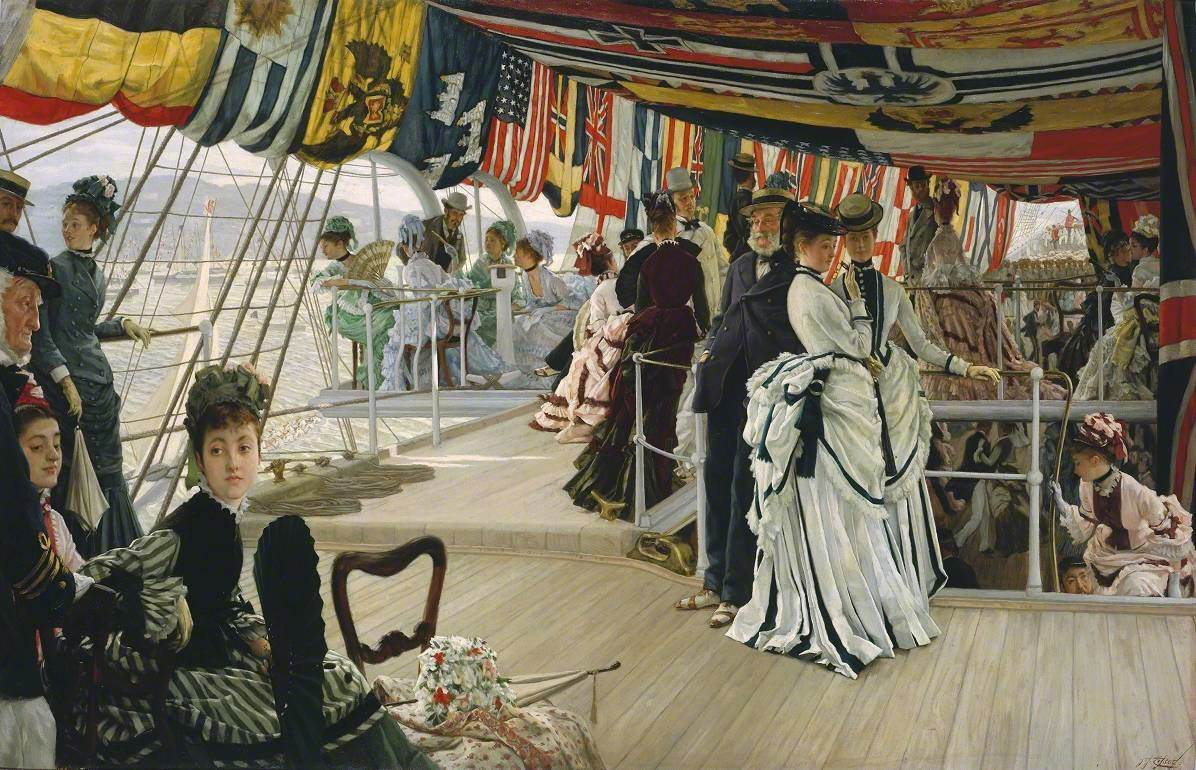
The Ball on Shipboard by James Tissot

Waiting by James Tissot

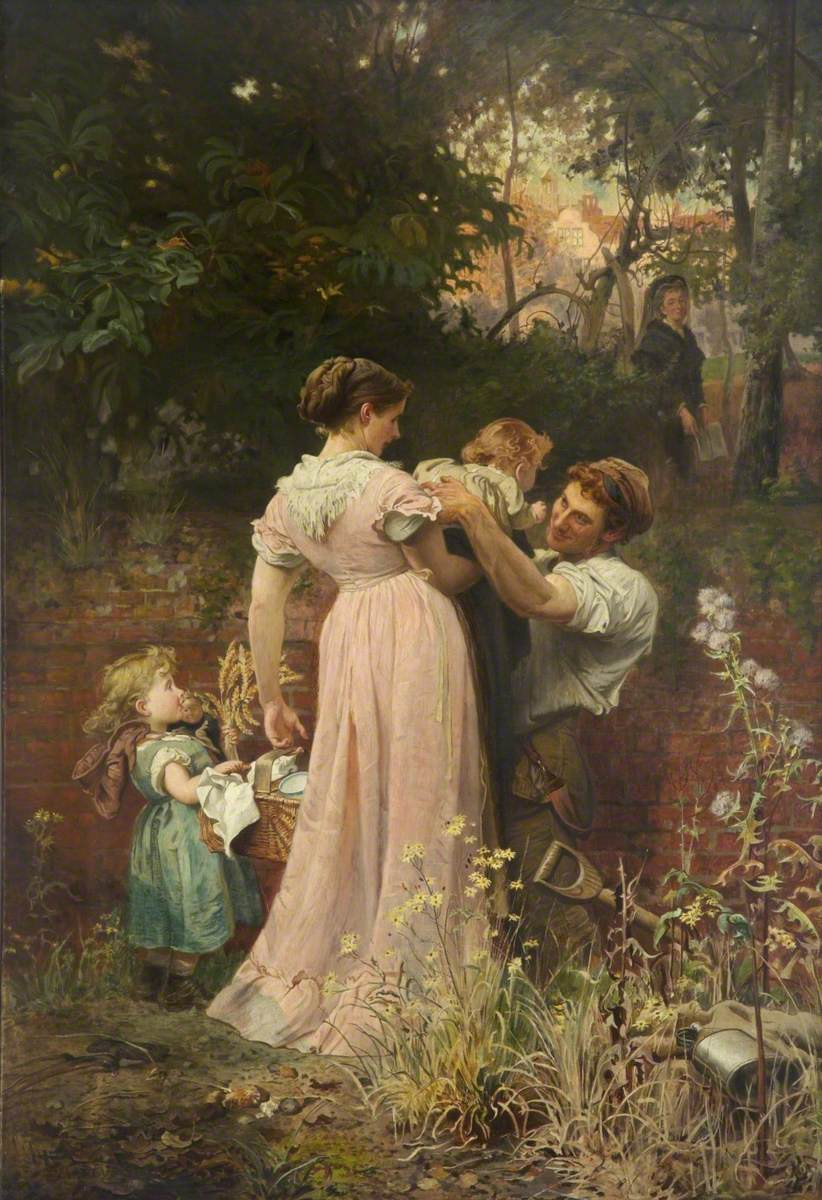
My Lady Is a Widow and Childless by Marcus Stone

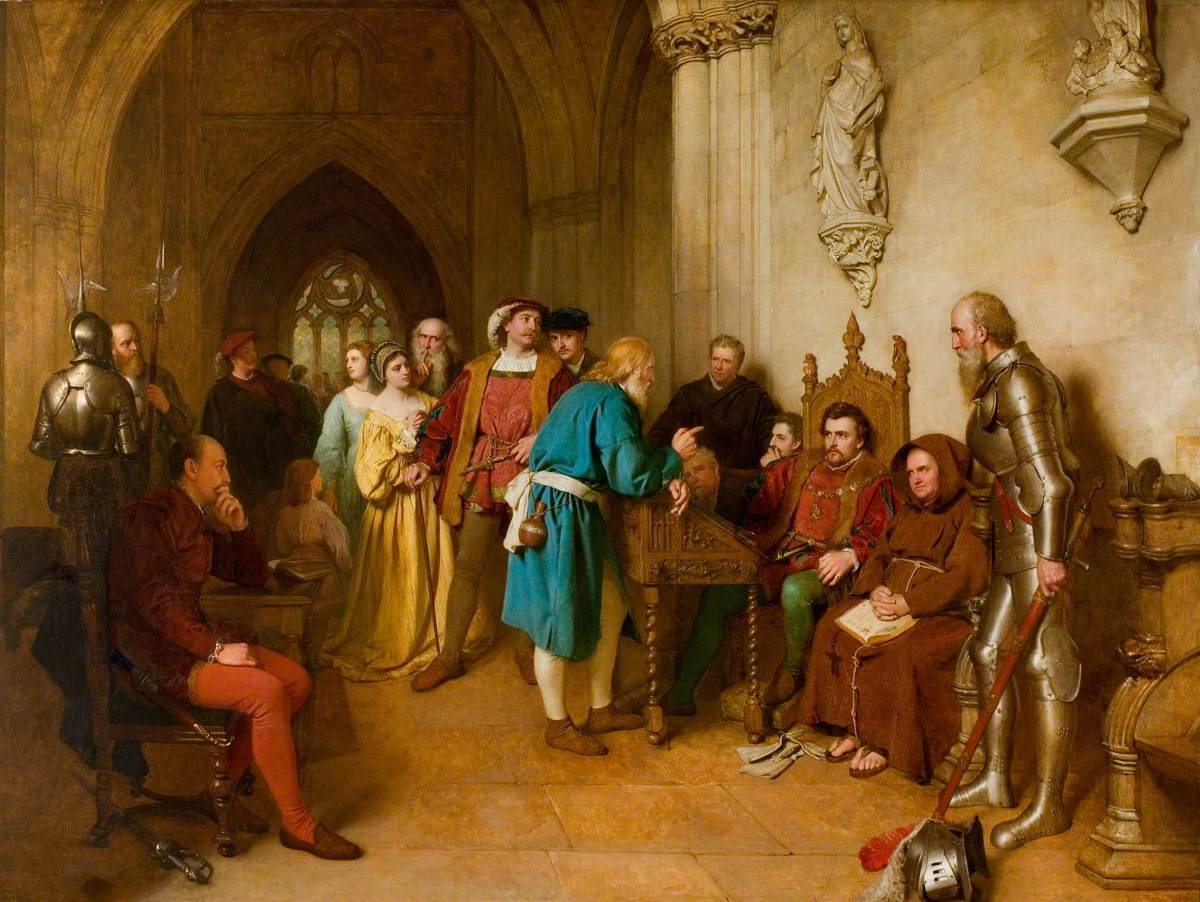
The Warning Before Flodden by John Faed

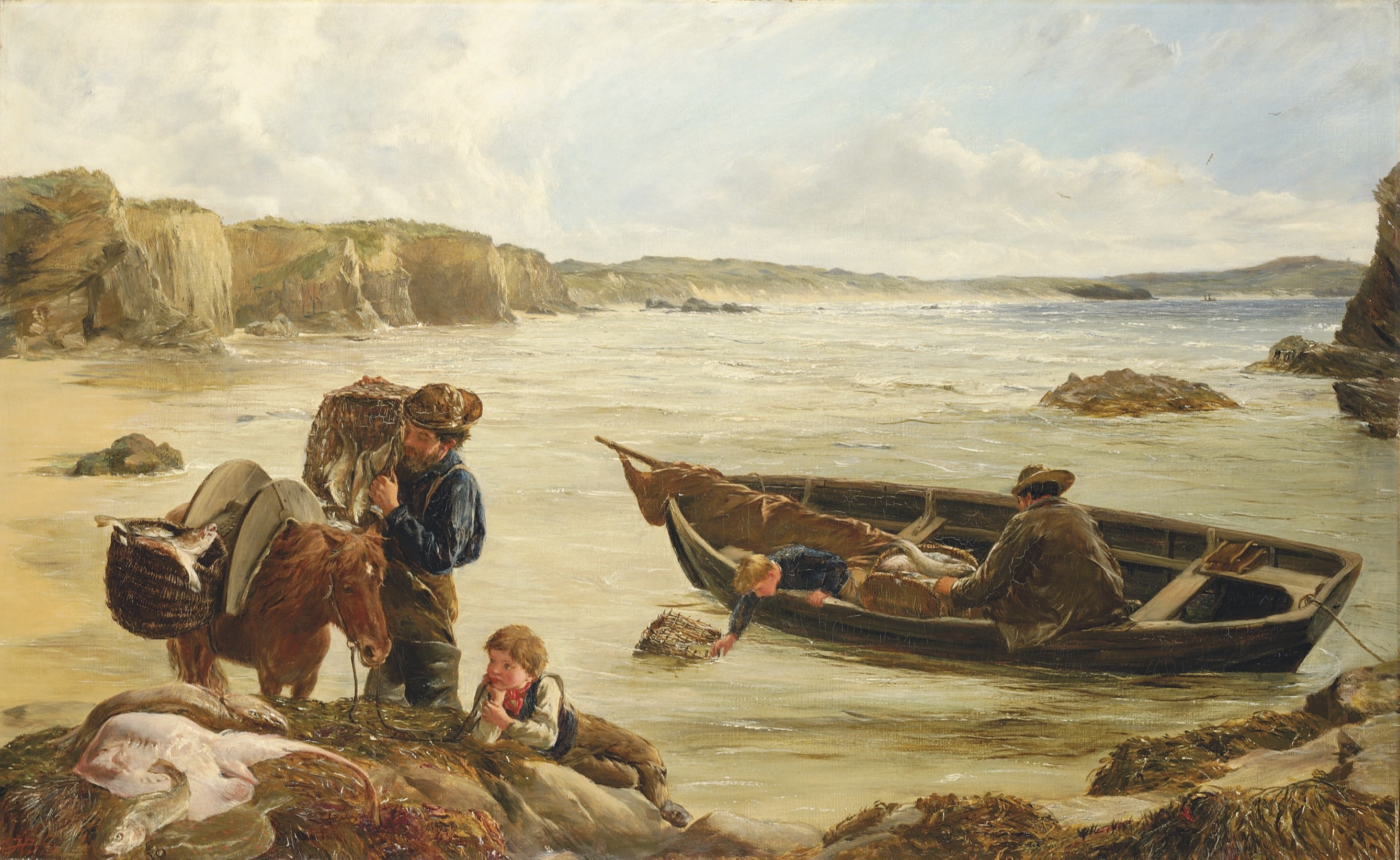
Under the Lee of a Rock by James Clarke Hook

Portrait of James Hunt by Francis Grant

Knitting a Stocking by Francis Grant

Wandering Thoughts by William Powell Frith

The Picture Gallery by Lawrence Alma-Tadema

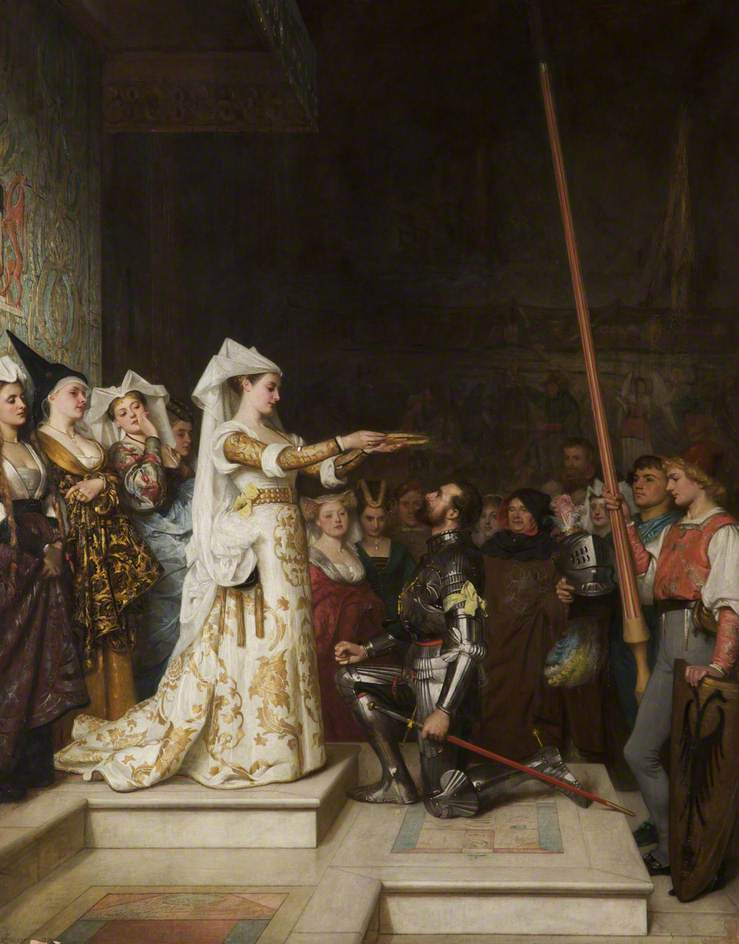
The Queen of the Tournament by Philip Hermogenes Calderon

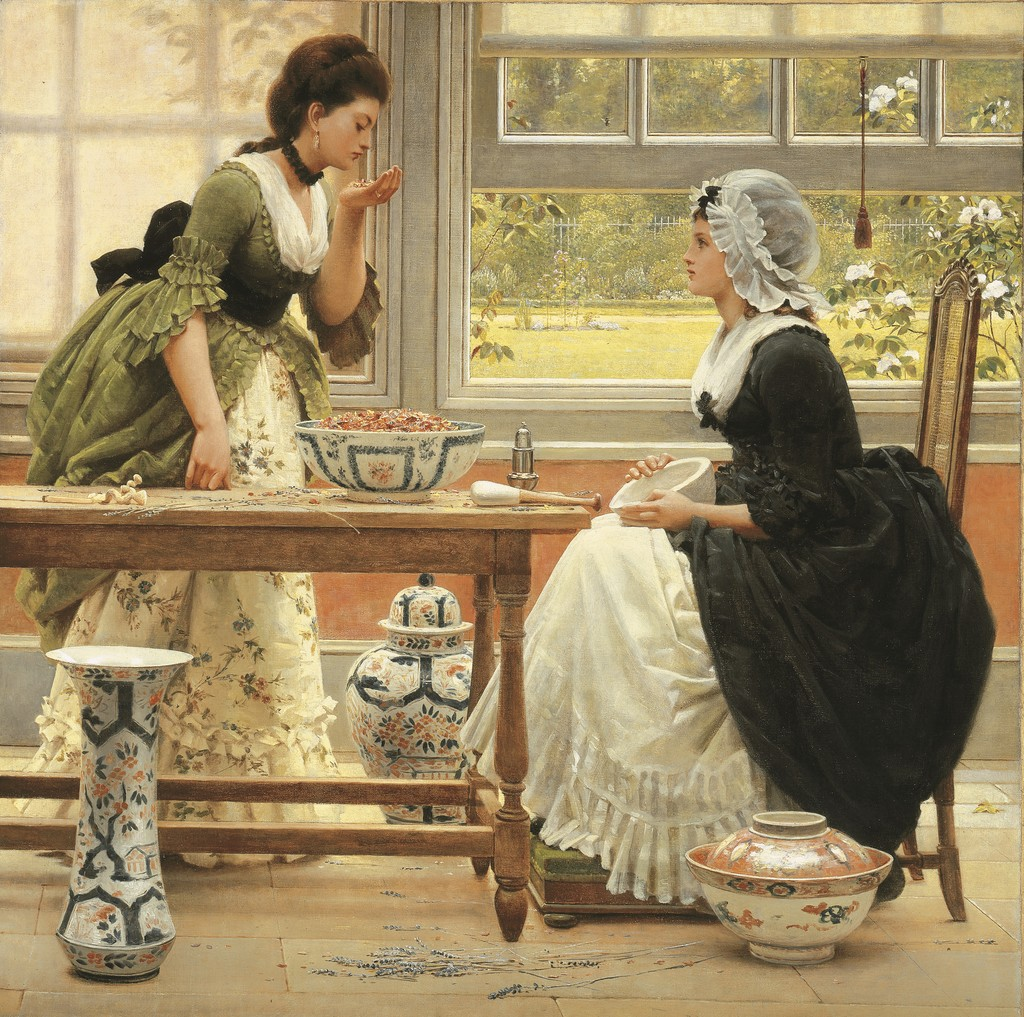
Pot Pourri by George Dunlop Leslie

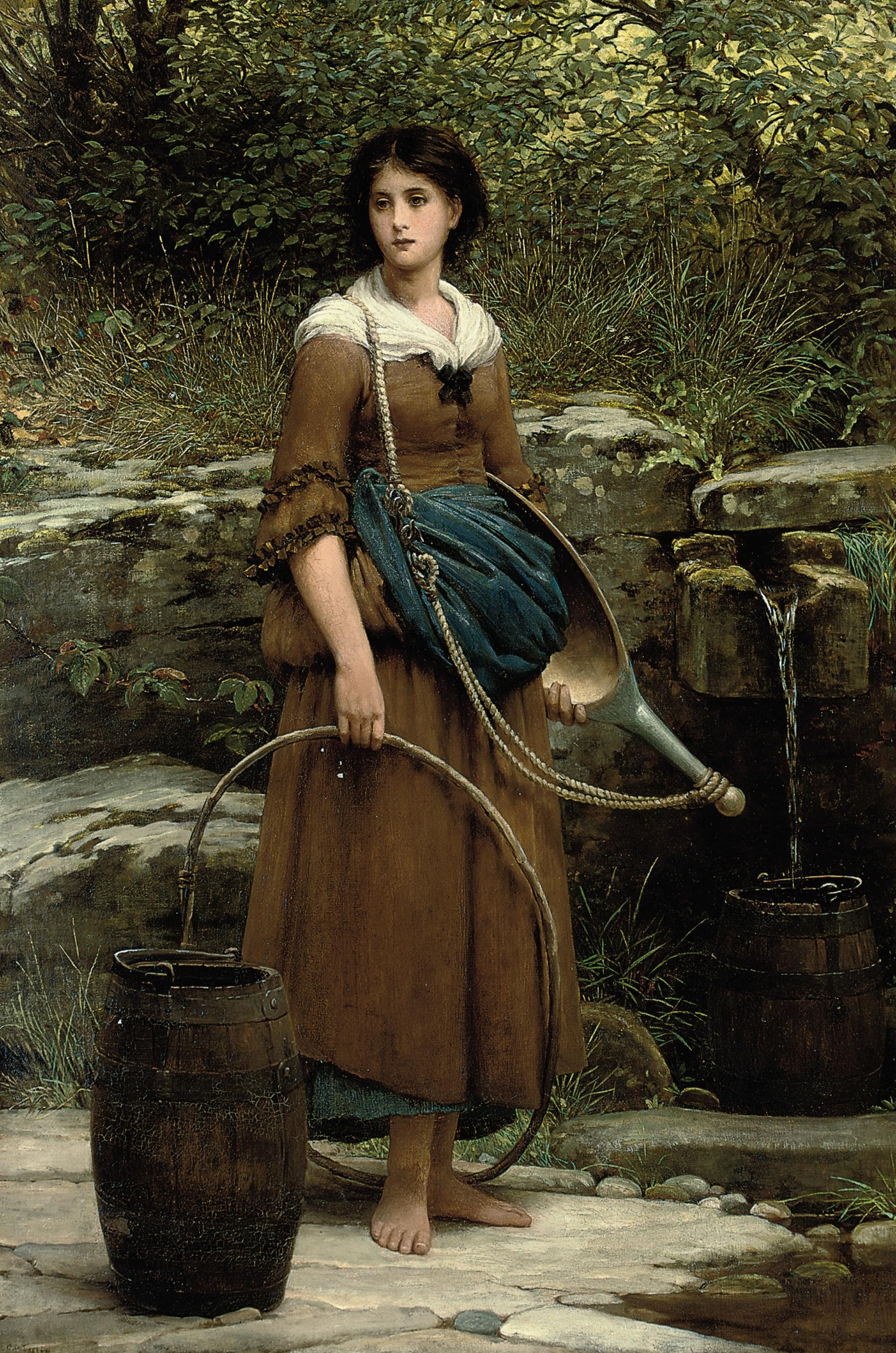
The Nut Brown Maid by George Dunlop Leslie

Rhodope by Edward Poynter

The Moorish Garden, a Dream of Granada by Frederic Leighton

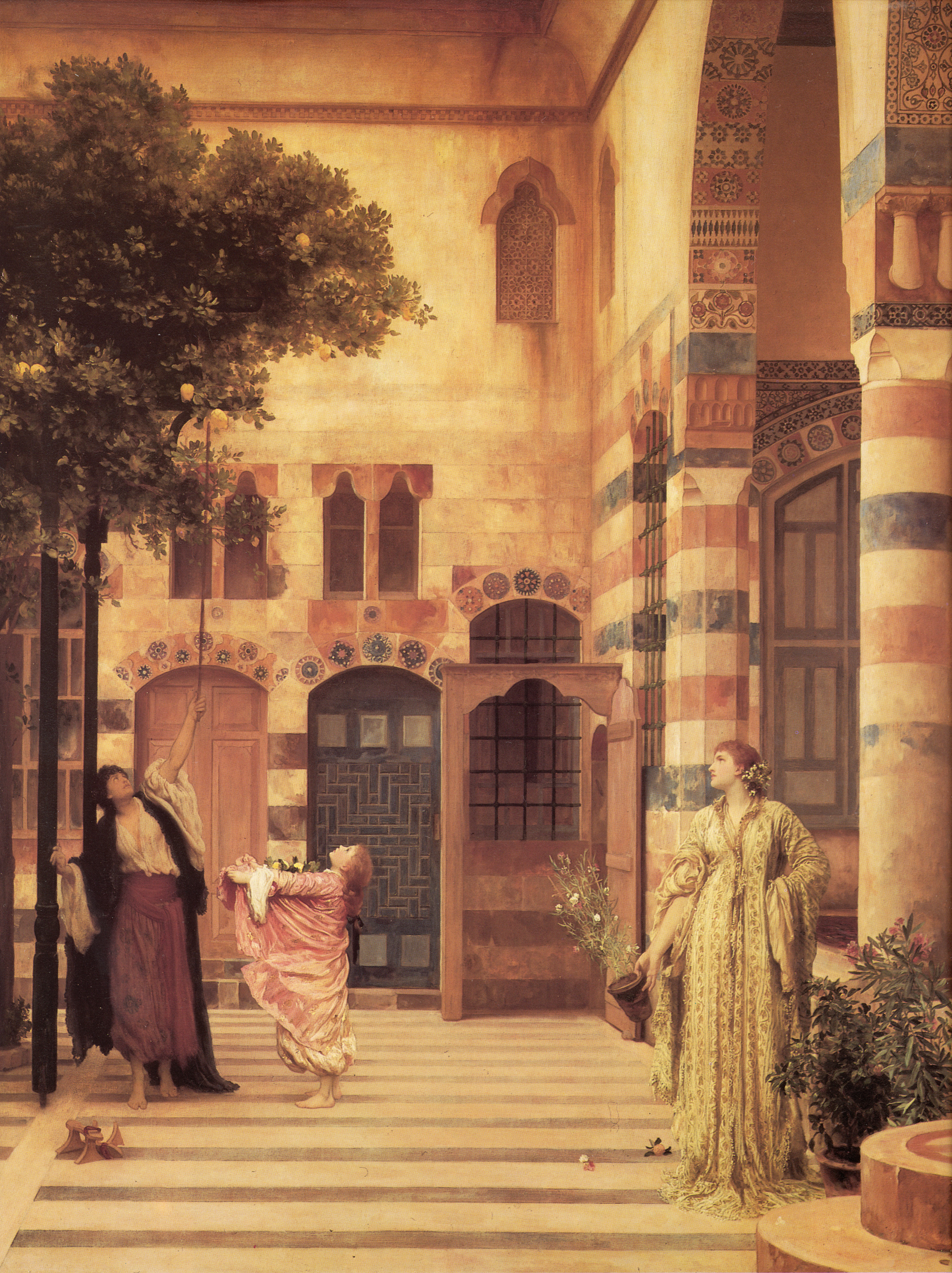
Old Damascus, Jew's Quarter by Frederic Leighton

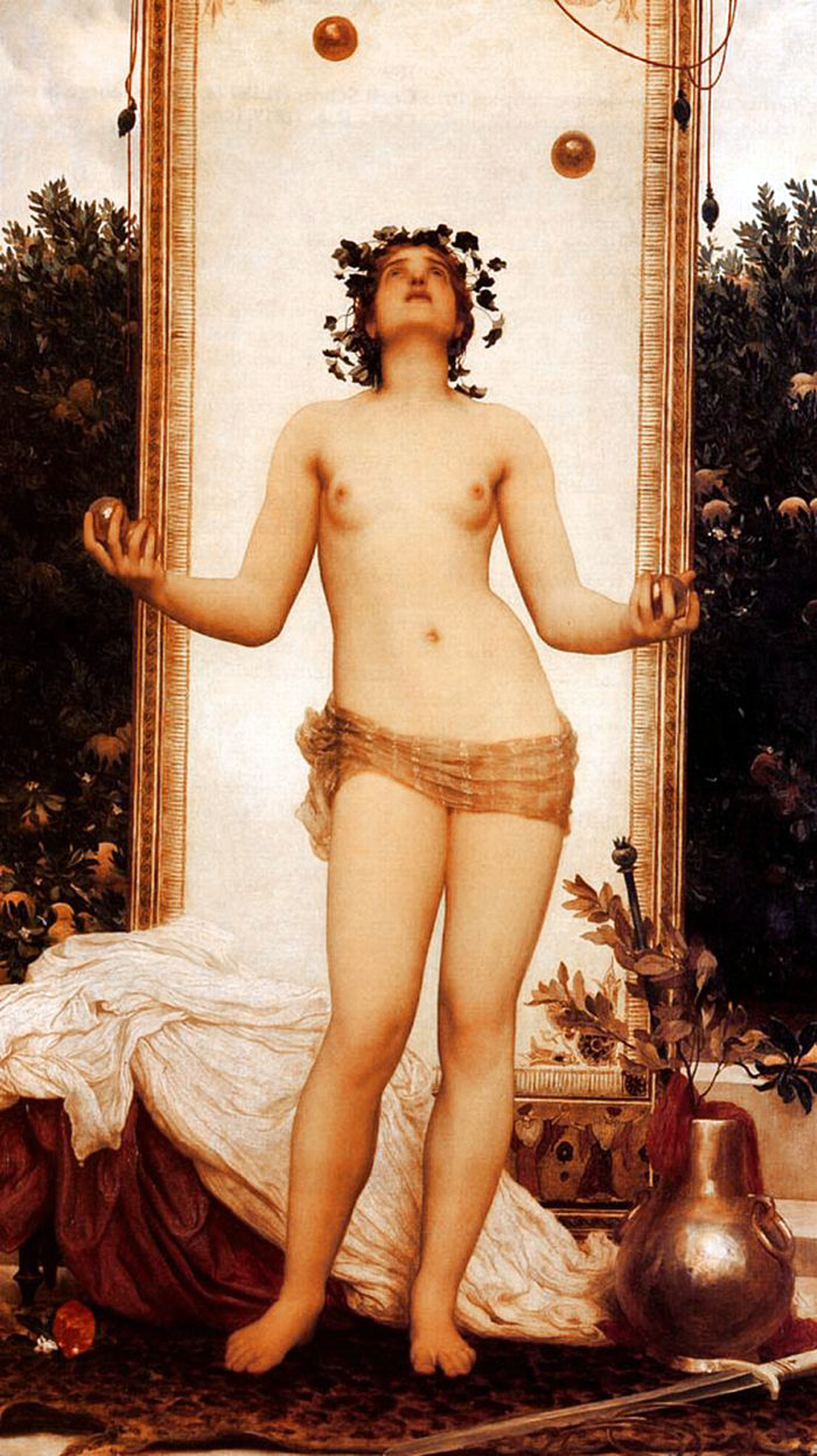
Antique Juggling Girl by Frederic Leighton

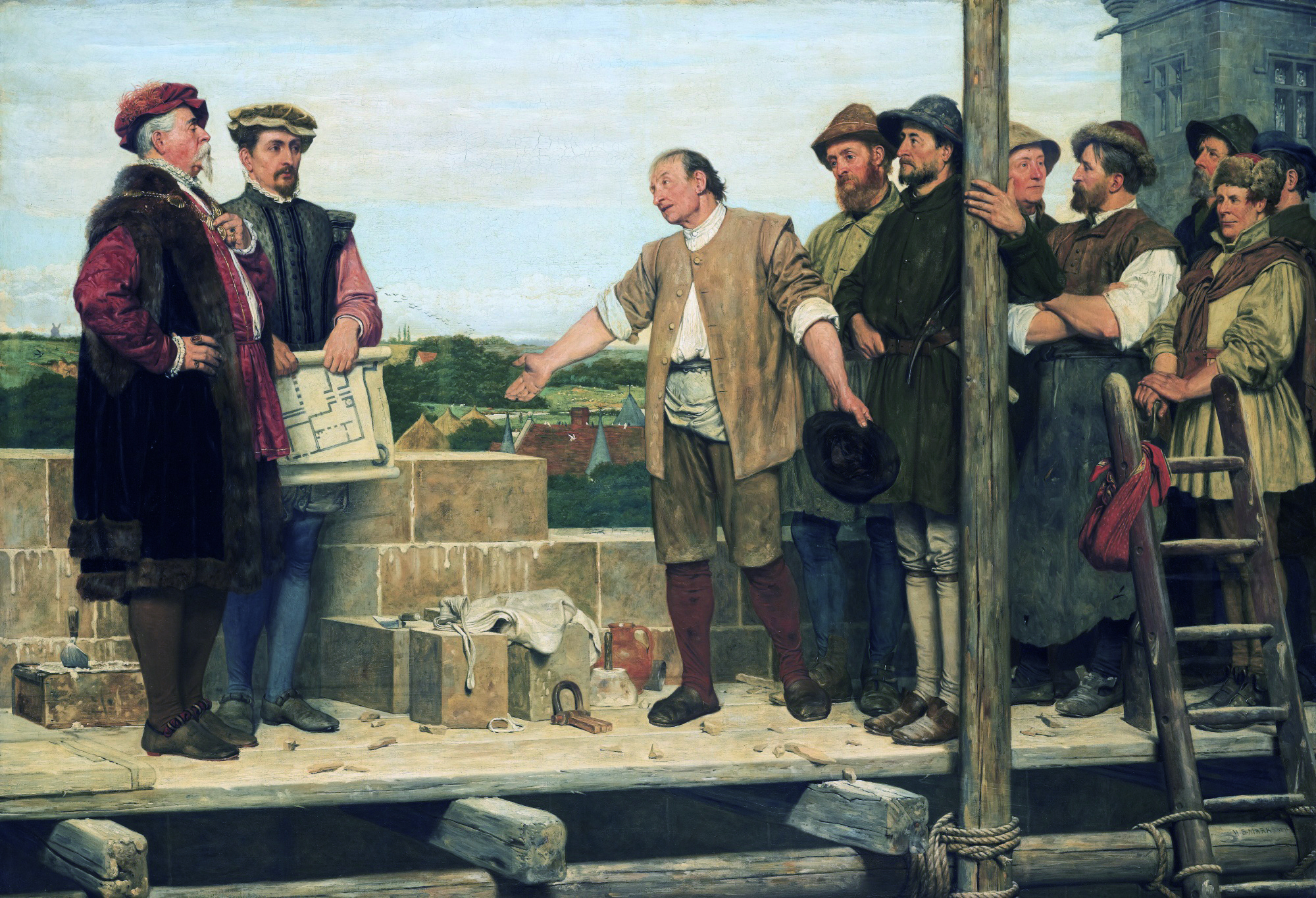
Capital and Labour by Henry Stacy Marks

Taming of the Shrew by Charles West Cope

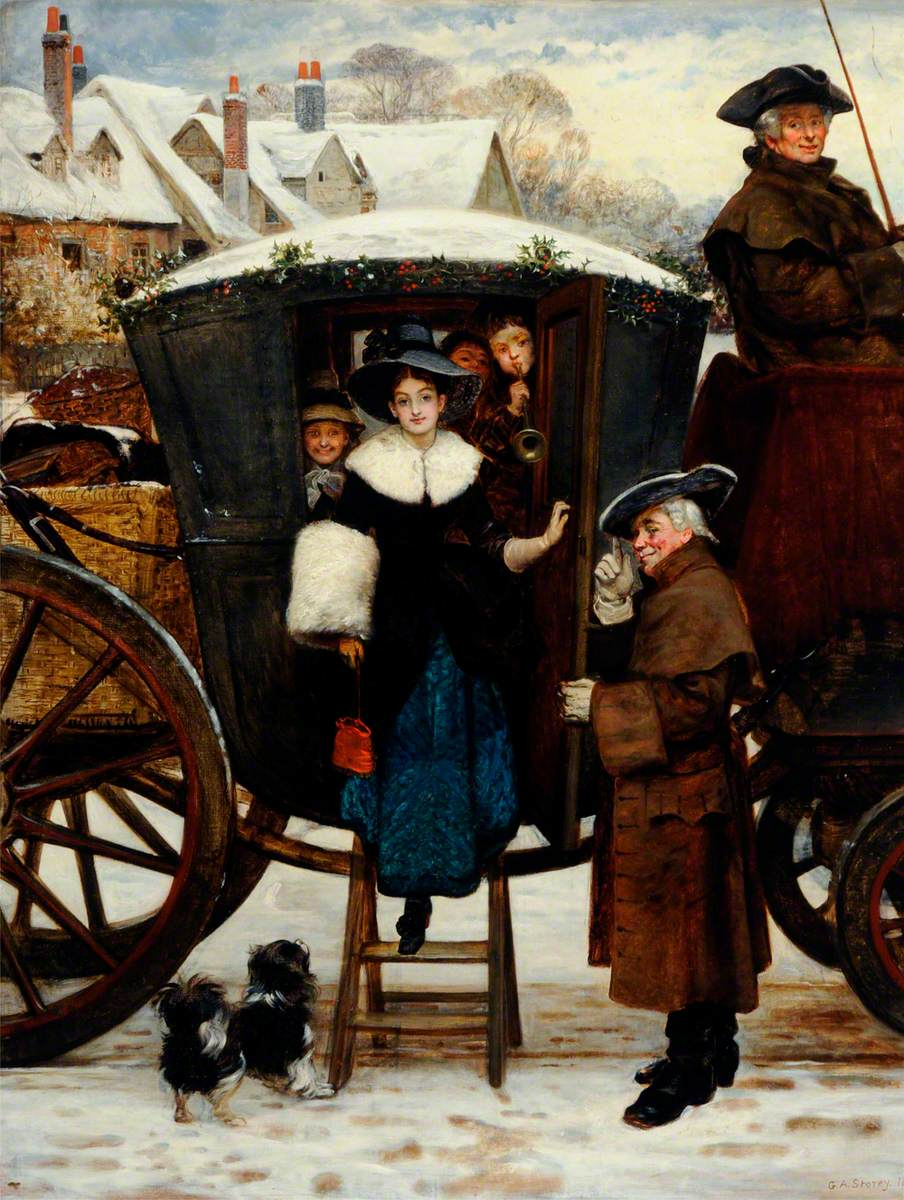
Grandmamma's Christmas Visitors by George Adolphus Storey

There's No Place Like Home by Thomas Sidney Cooper

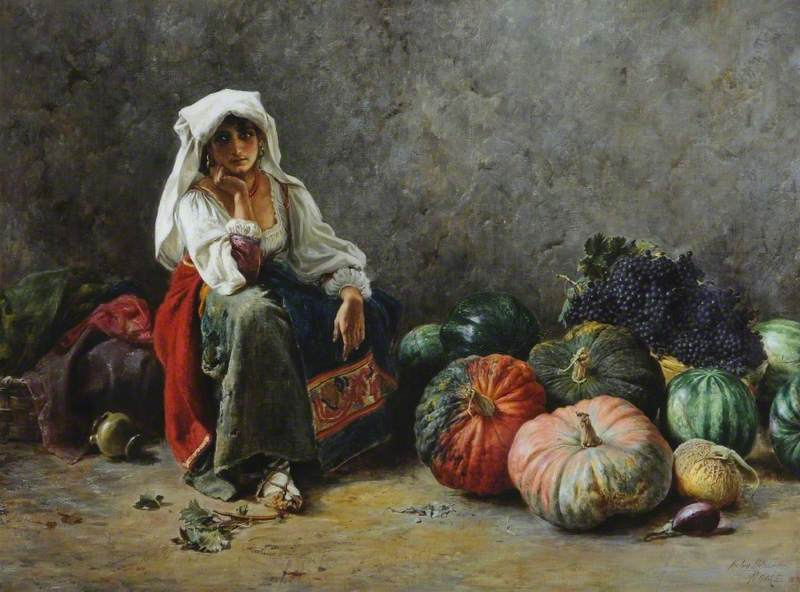
A Roman Fruitseller by Keeley Halswelle

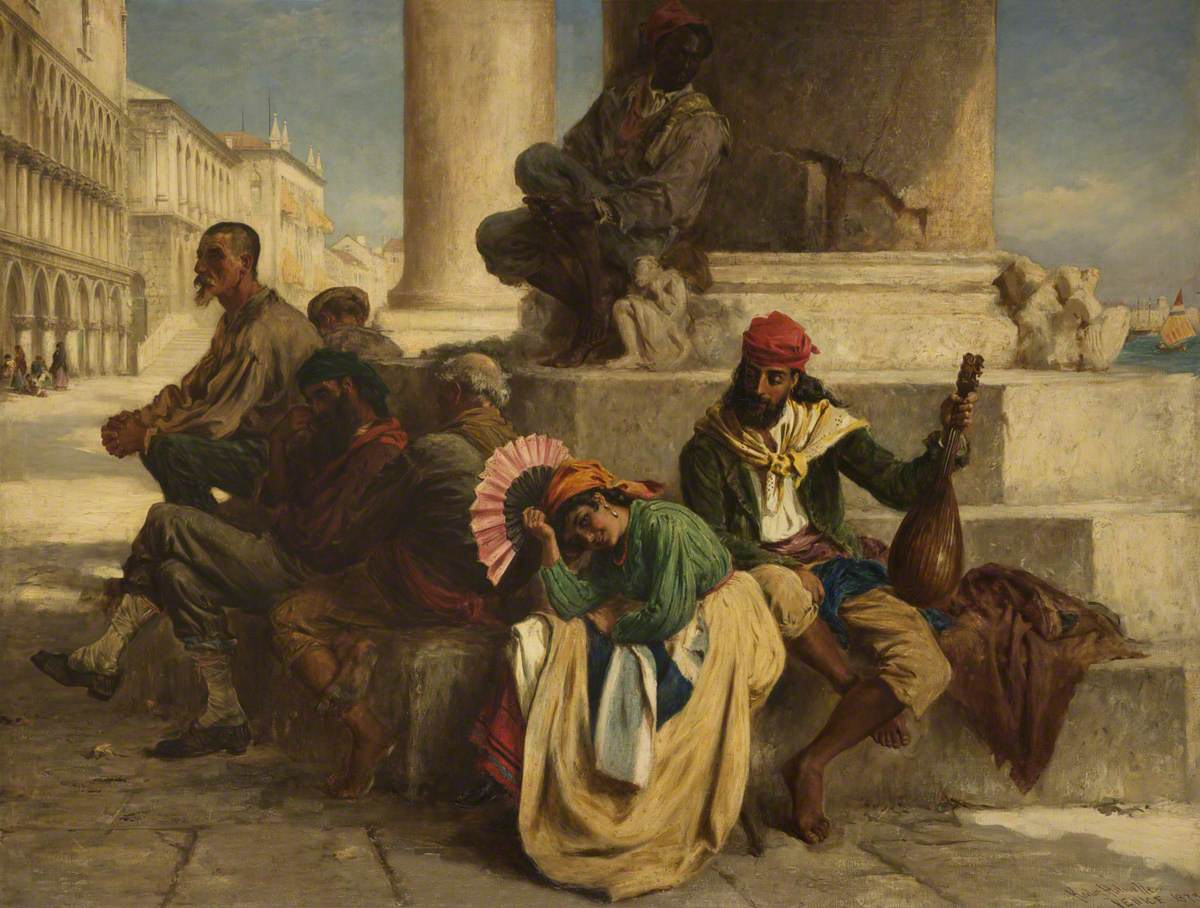
Under the Lion of St Mark's by Keeley Halswelle

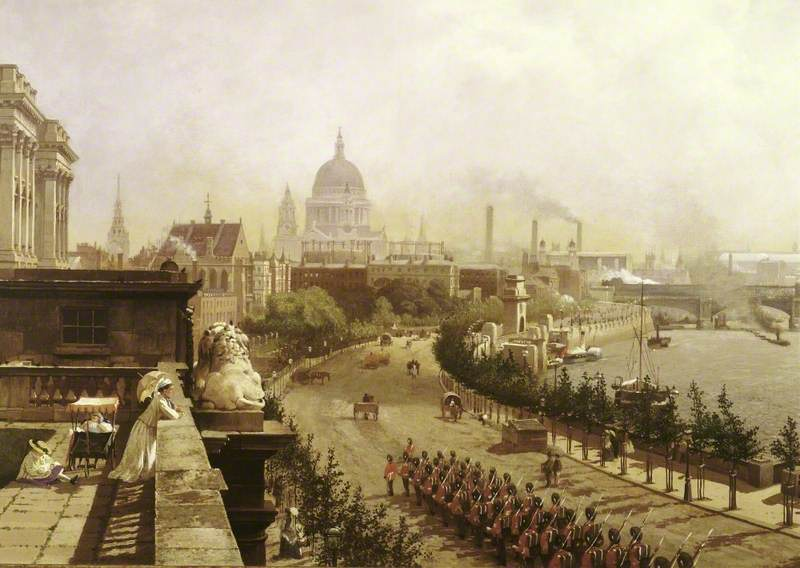
The Embankment, London by John O'Connor

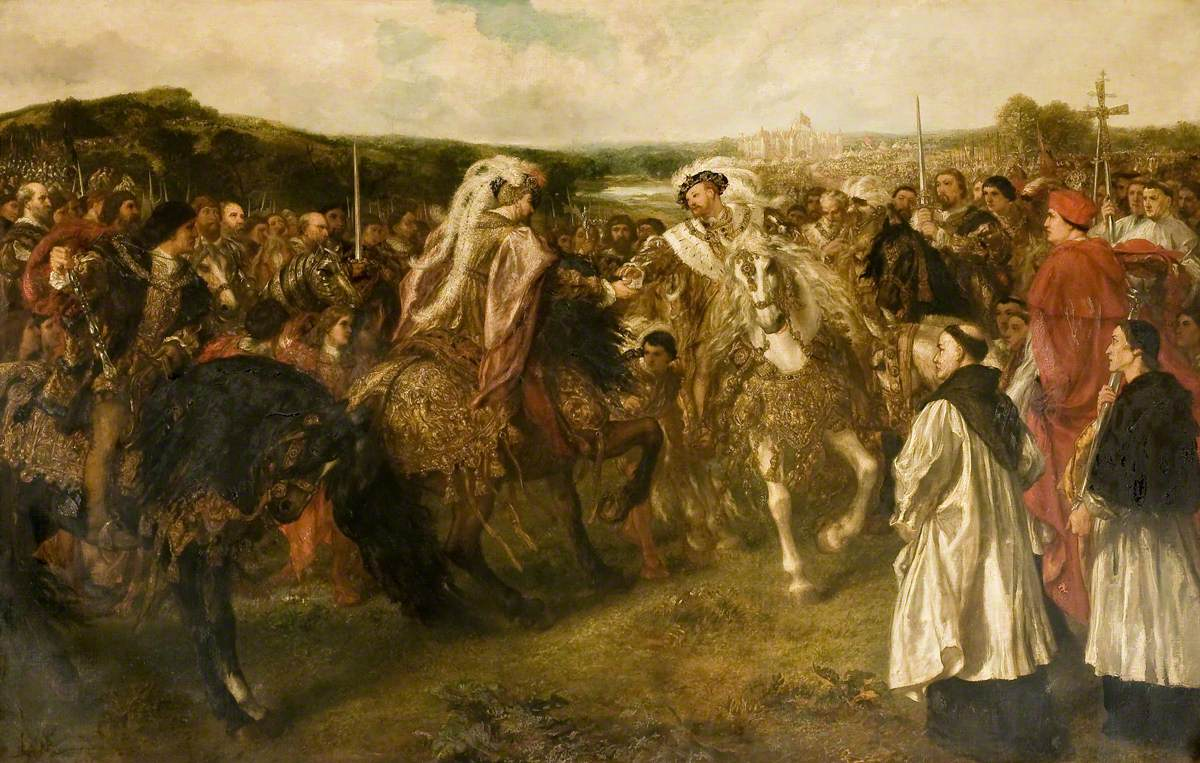
The Field of the Cloth of Gold by John Gilbert

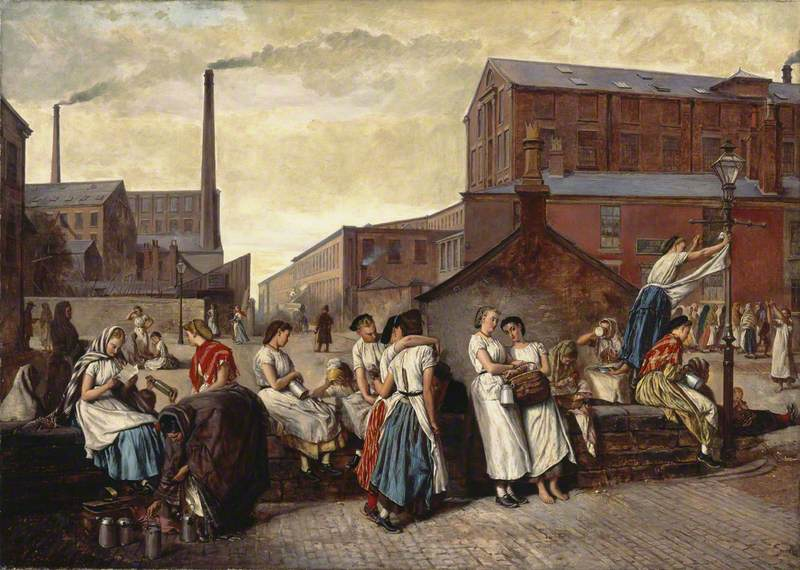
The Dinner Hour, Wigan by Eyre Crowe

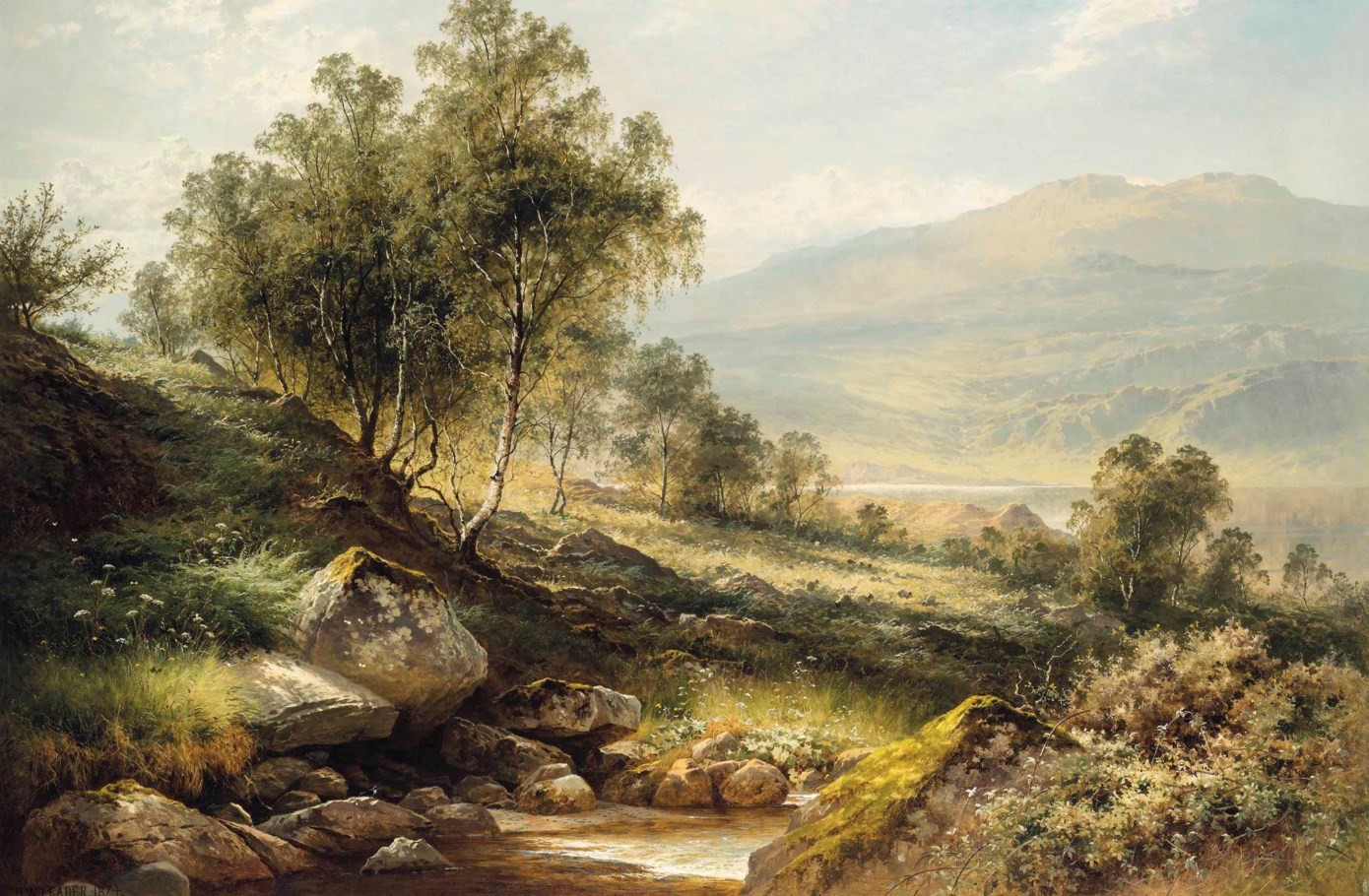
A Dewy Morning on the Mountains, Capel Curig by Benjamin Williams Leader

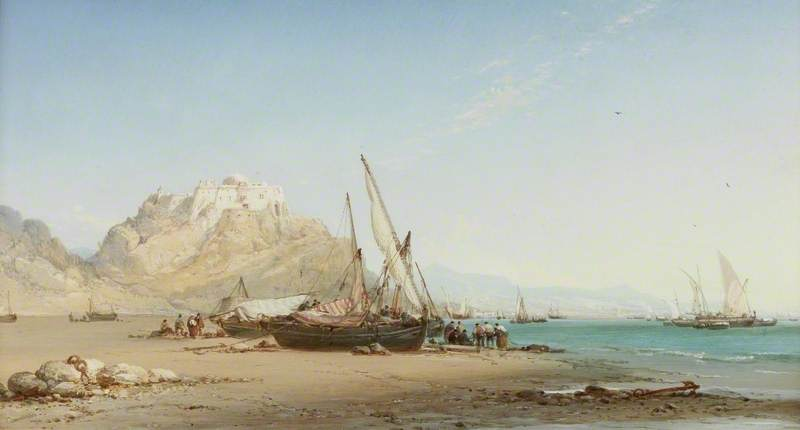
Cartagena, Spain by James Webb

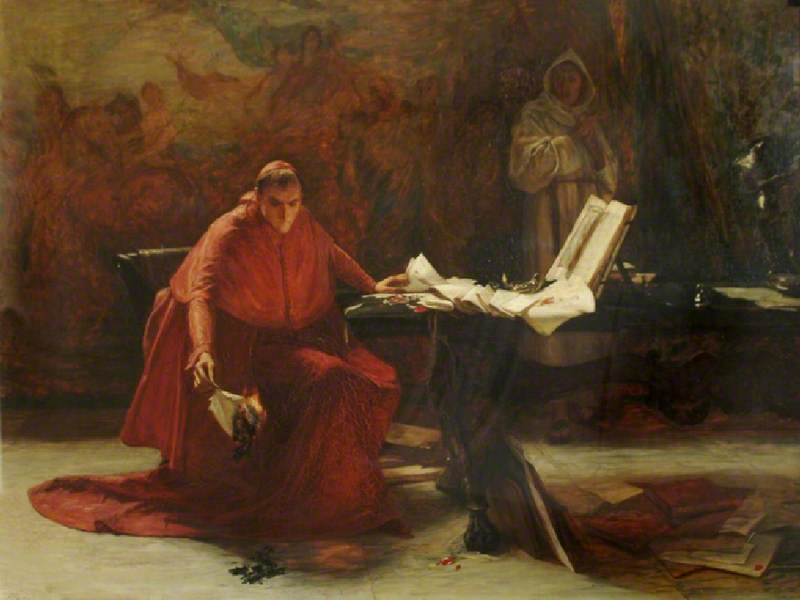
A State Secret by John Pettie

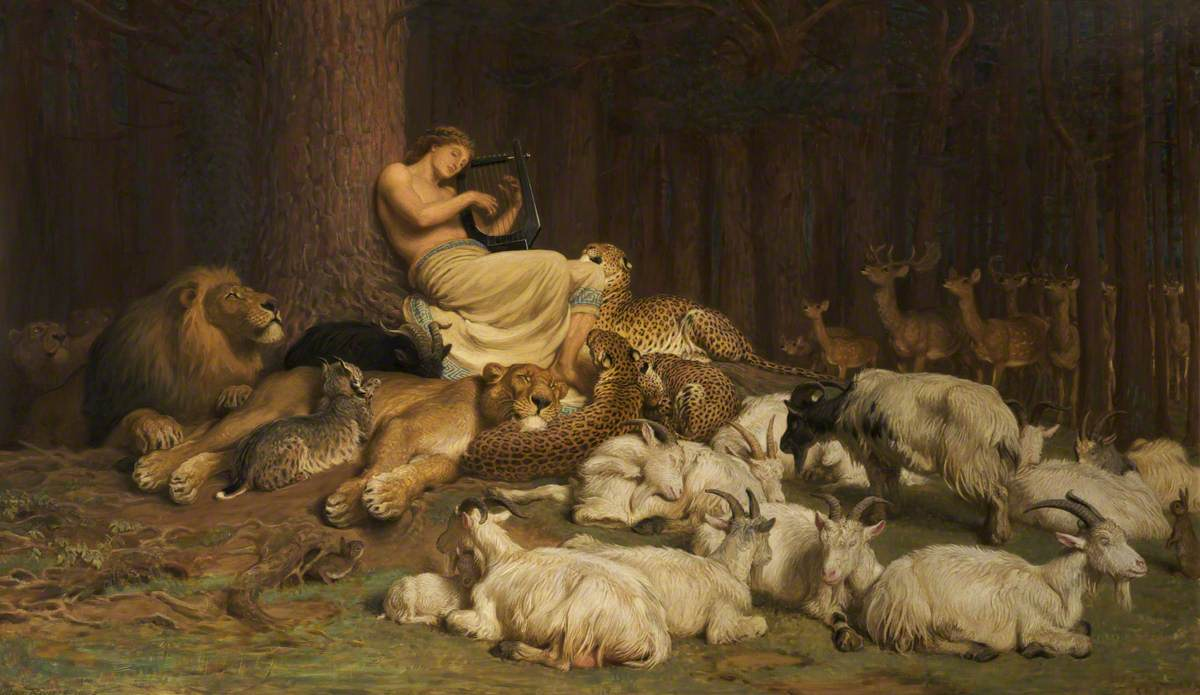
Apollo by Briton Riviere

An Appeal to the Podesta by William Frederick Yeames

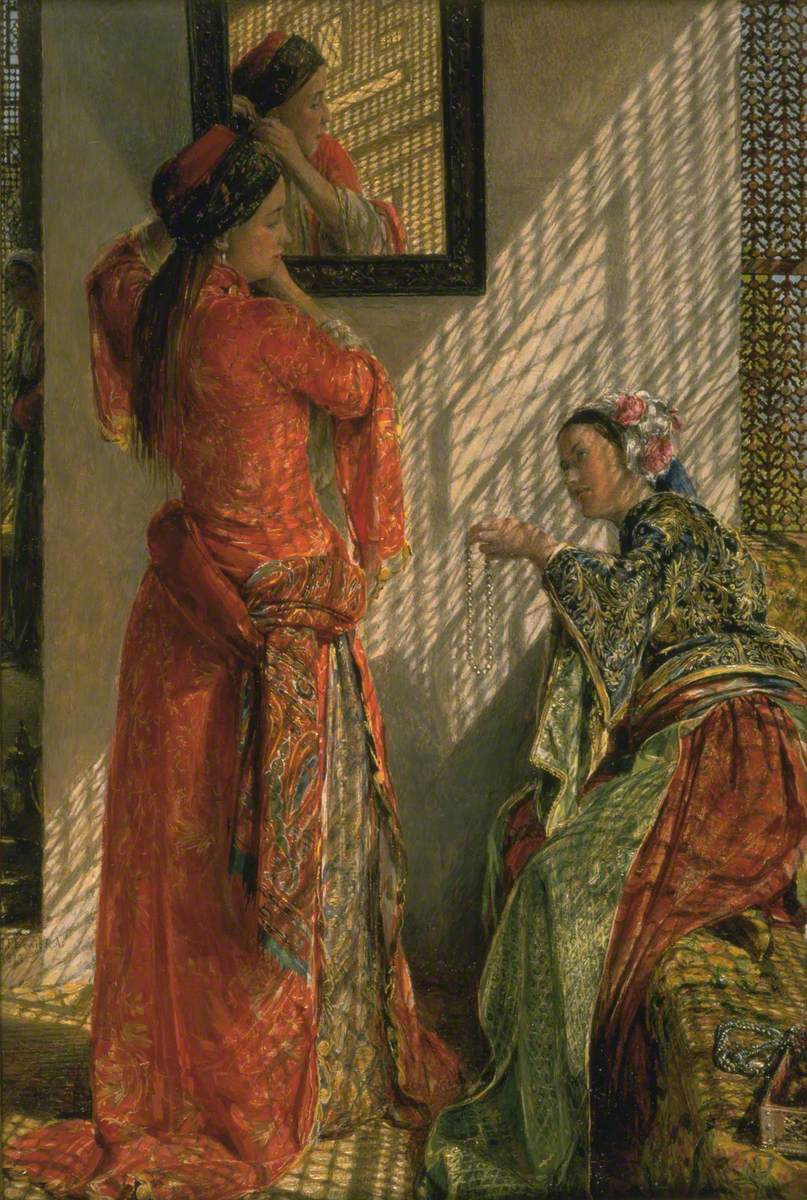
Indoor Gossip, Cairo by John Frederick Lewis

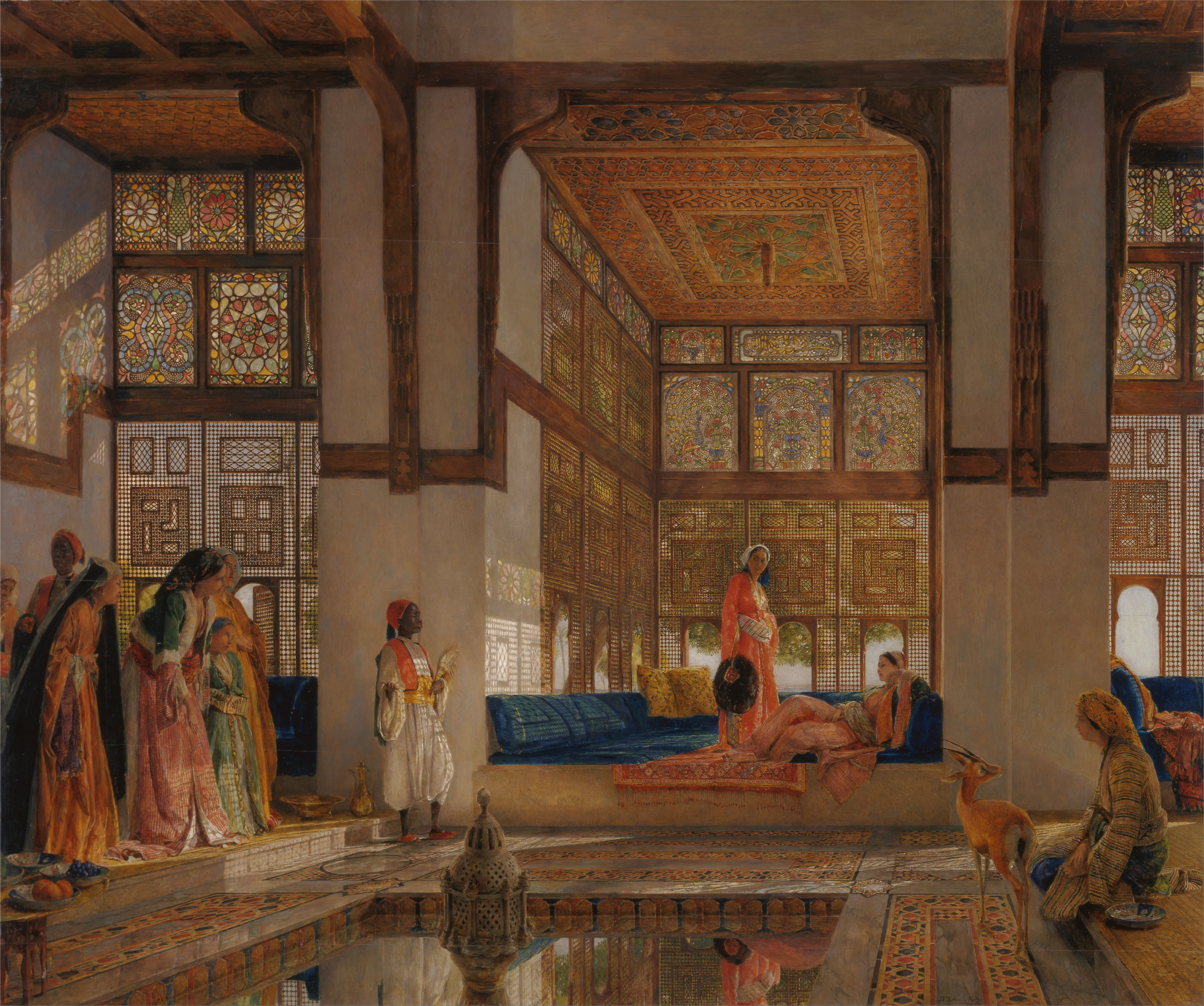
A Lady Receiving Visitors by John Frederick Lewis

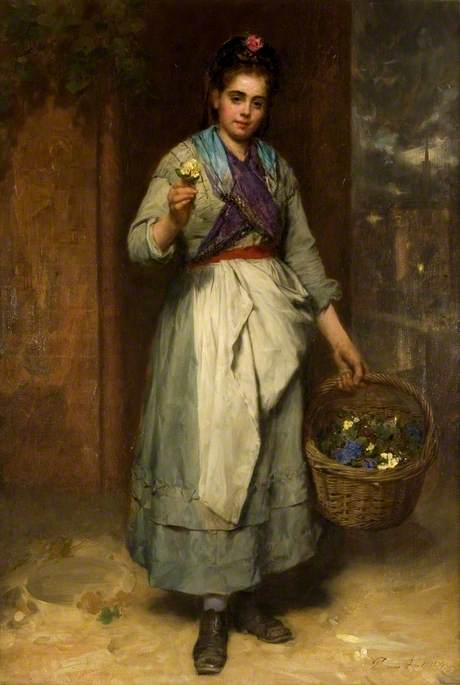
Violets and Primroses by Thomas Faed

Alice Bridgenorth and Julian Peveril by Alfred Elmore

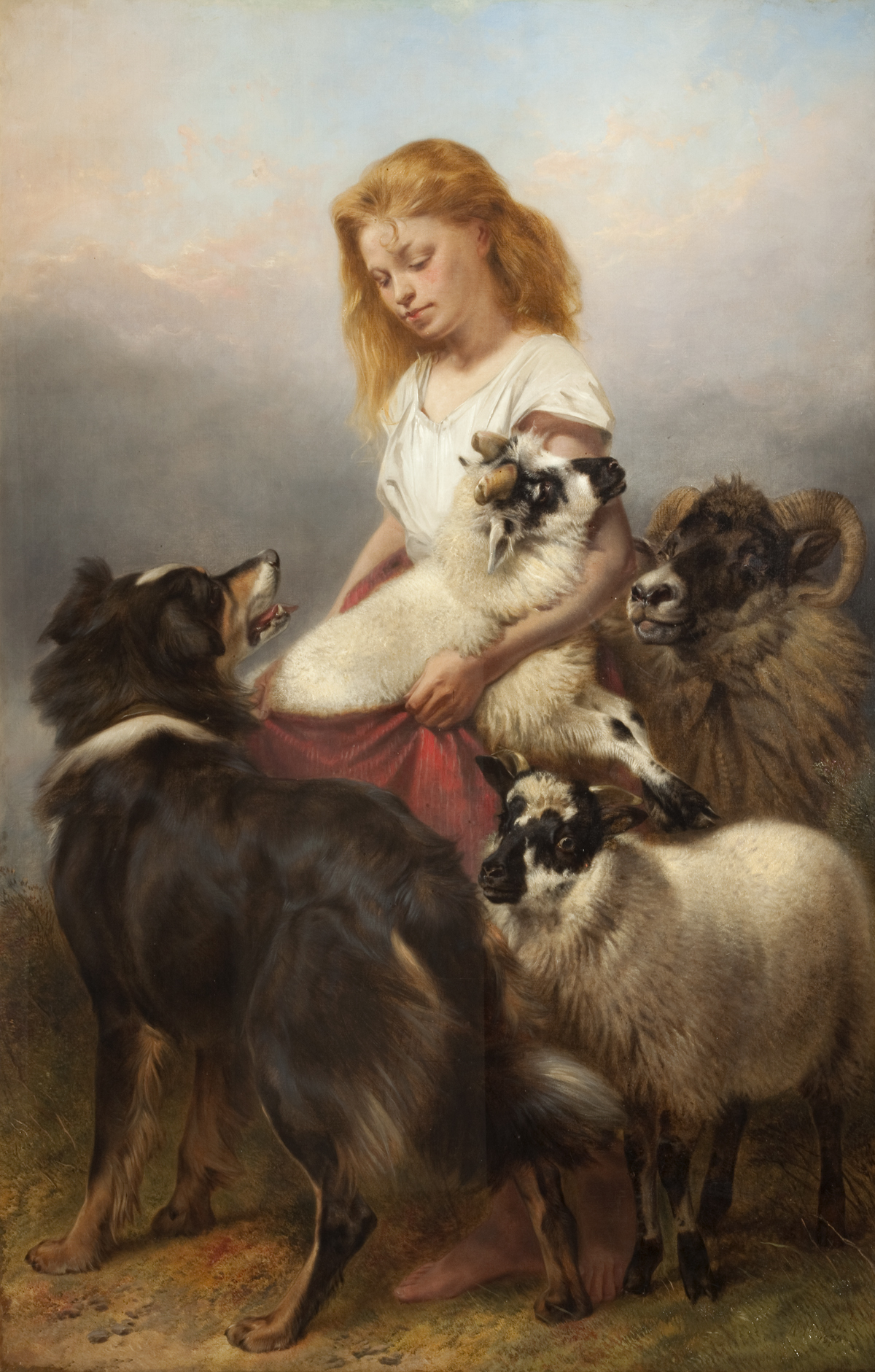
The Herd Lassie by Richard Ansdell

Startled Foresters by Richard Redgrave

Woodcutters by John Linnell

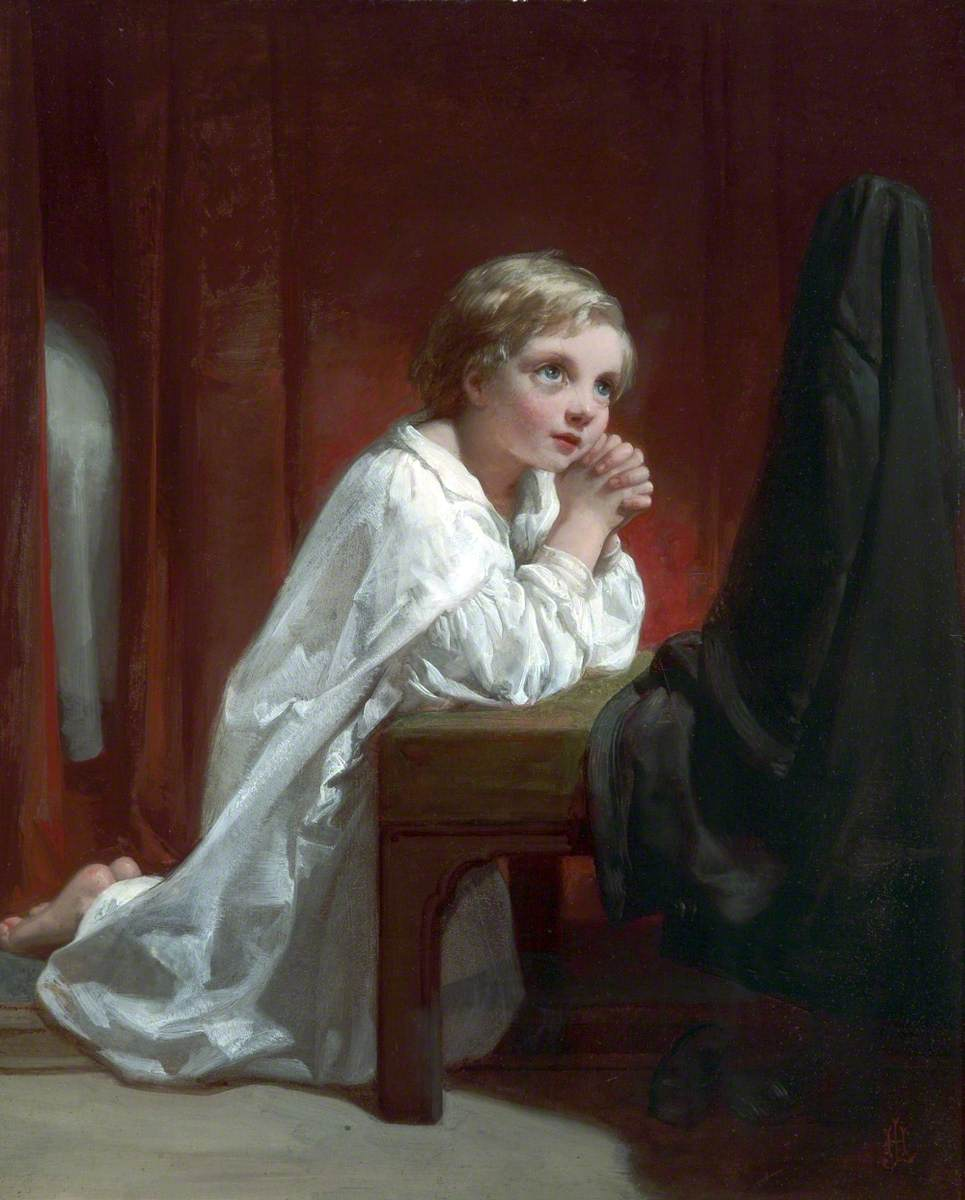
Innocence by Henry Lejeune

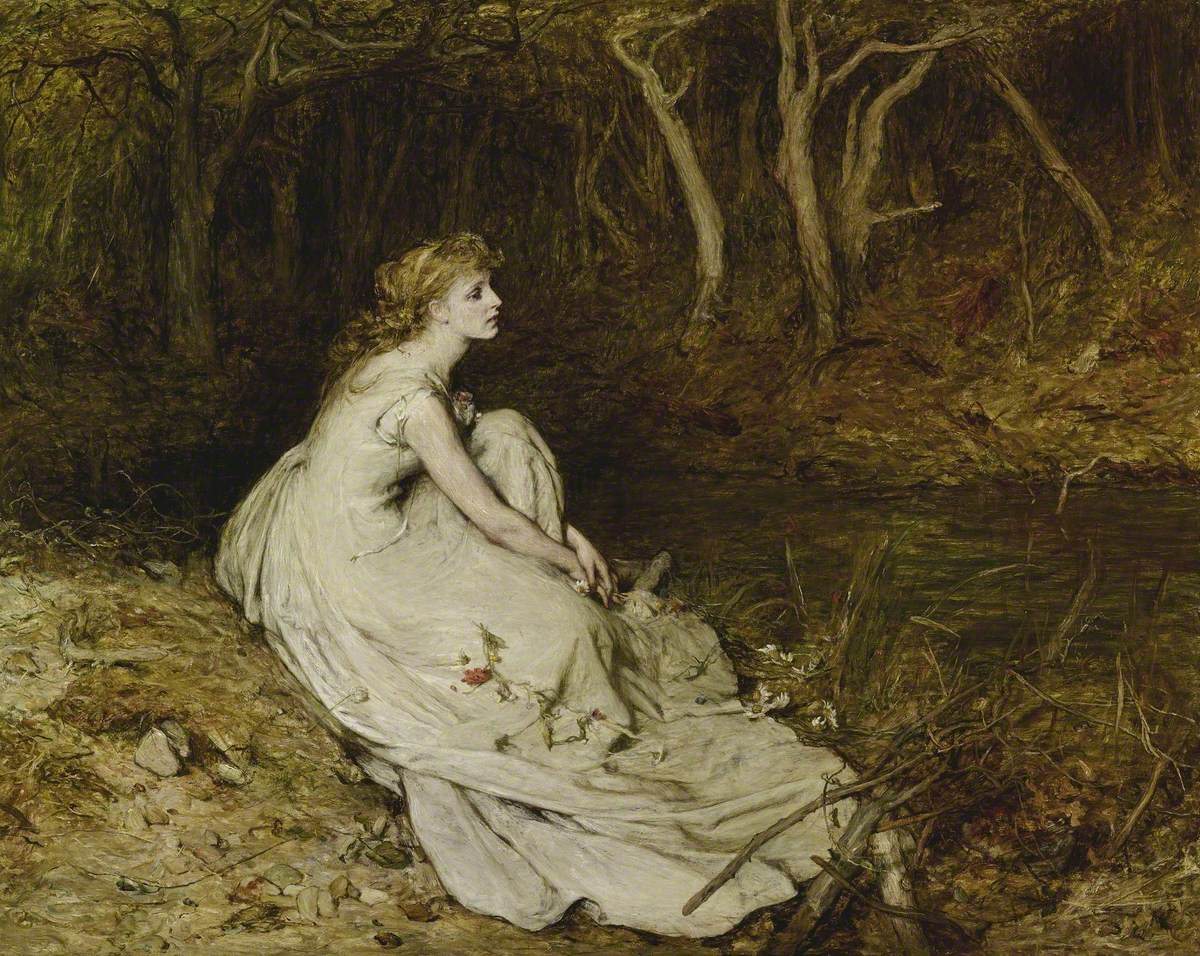
Ophelia by William Quiller Orchardson

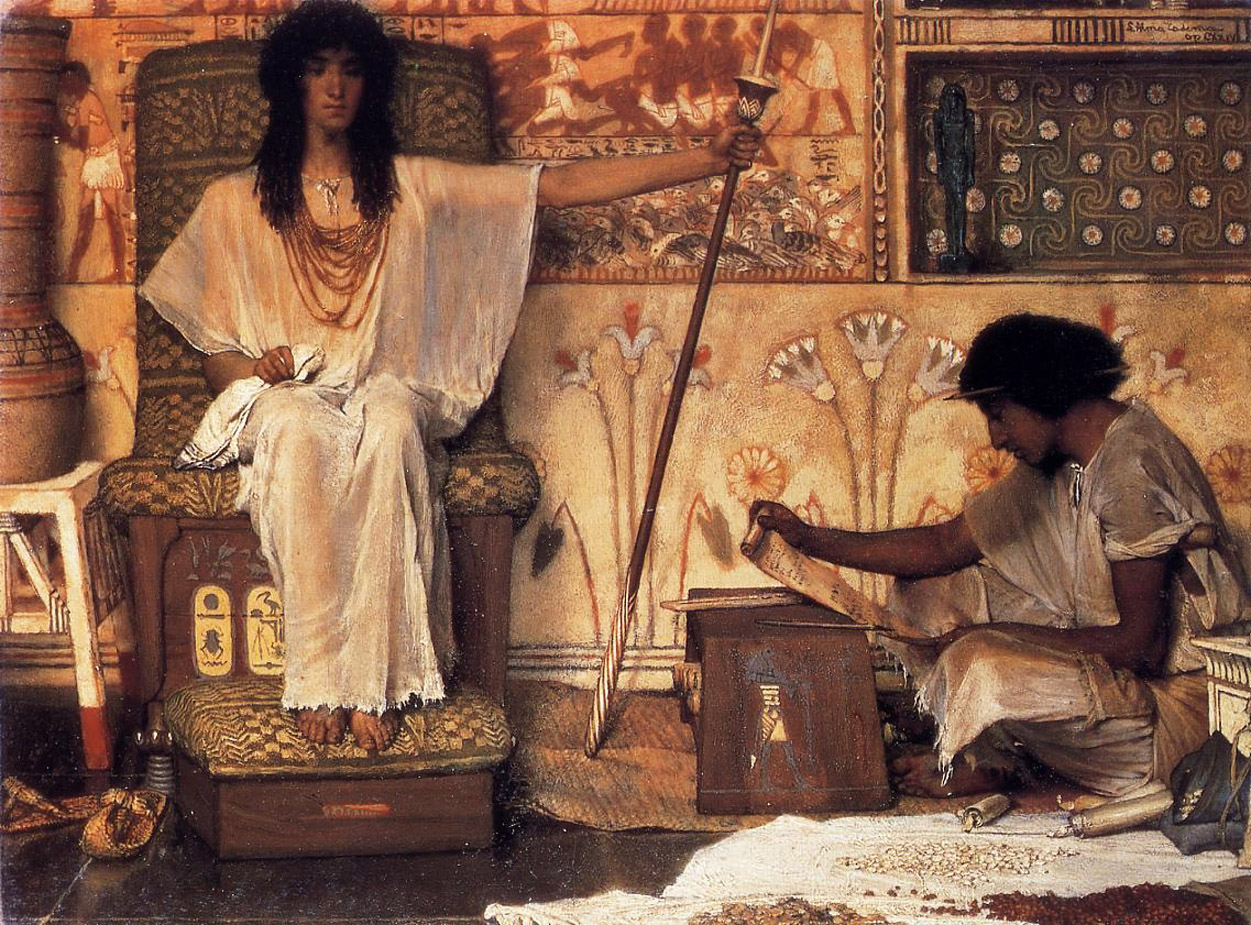
Joseph, Overseer of Pharaoh’s Granaries by Lawrence Alma-Tadema

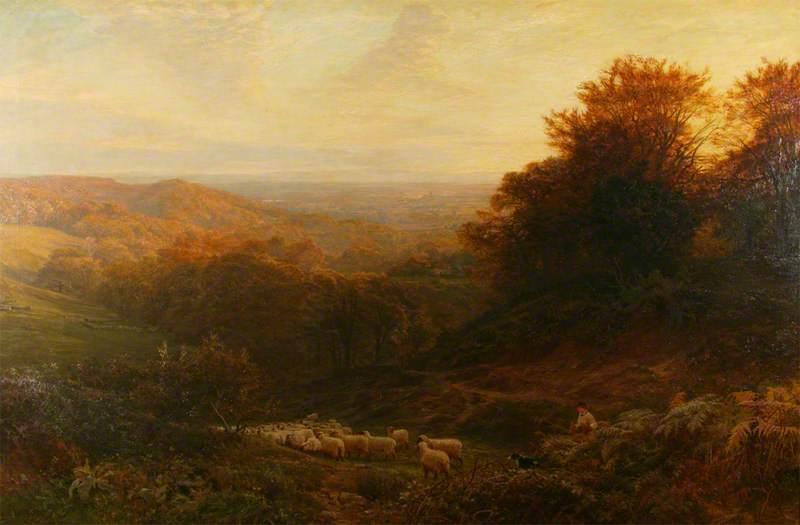
The Heart of Surrey by George Vicat Cole

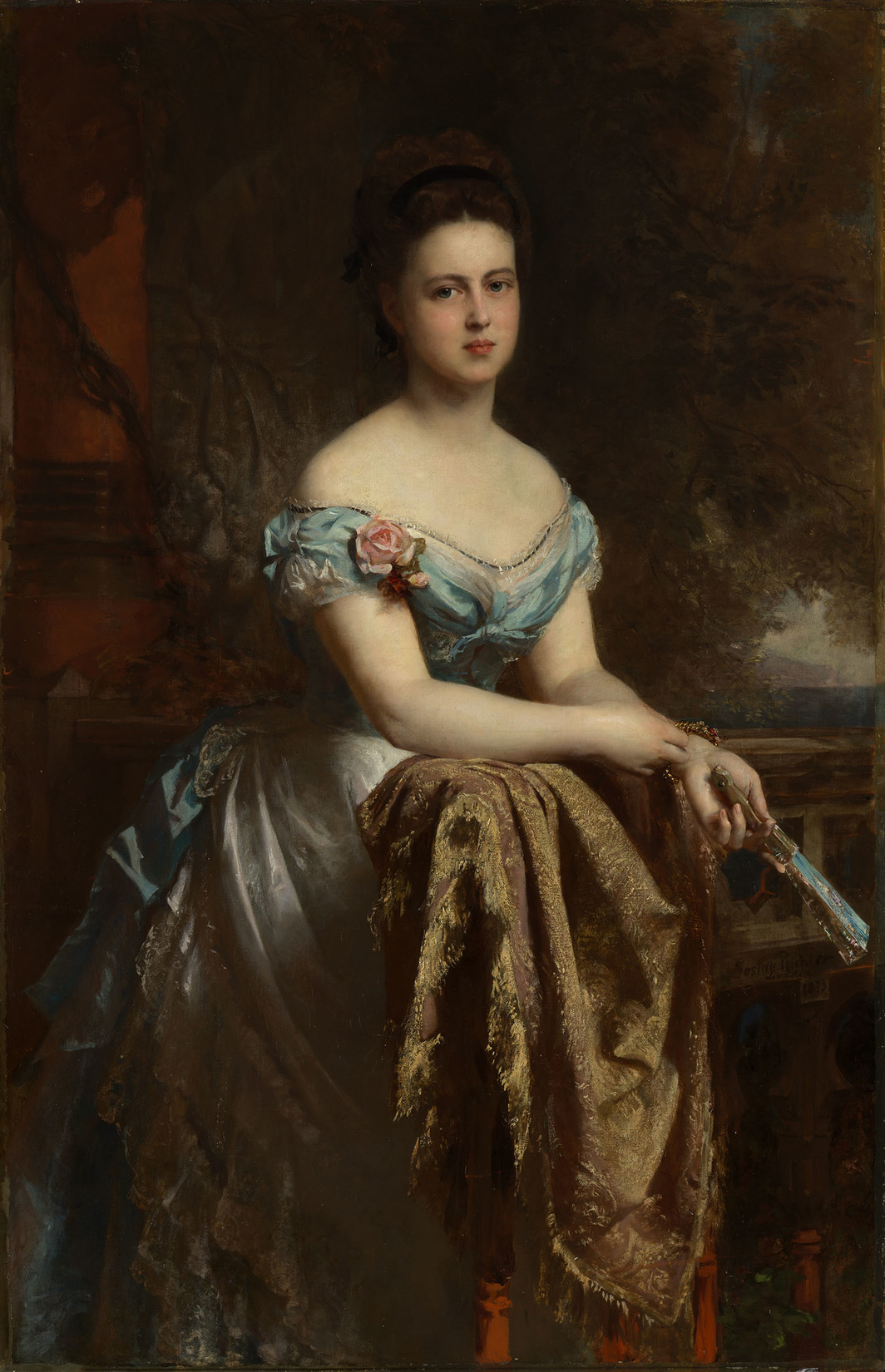
Portrait of Maria, Duchess of Edinburgh by Gustav Richter

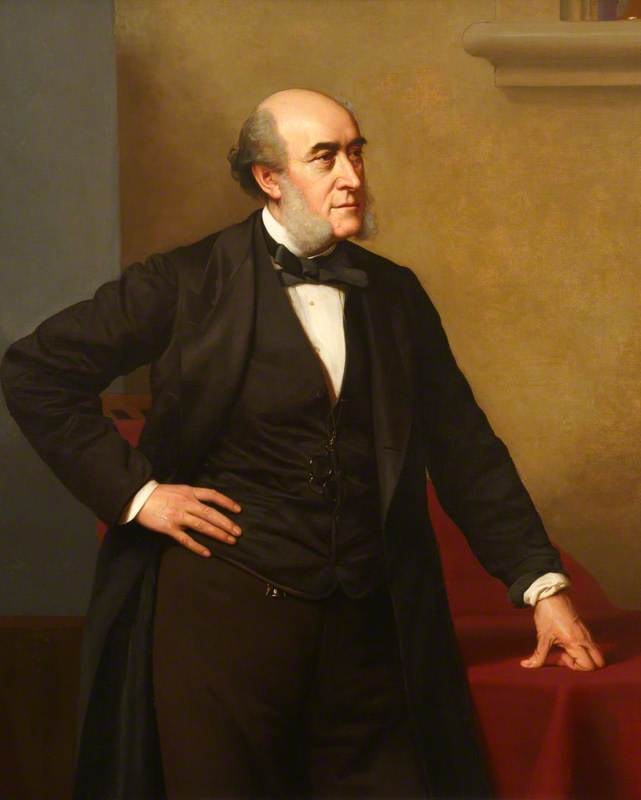
Portrait of Sir William Fergusson by Rudolf Lehmann

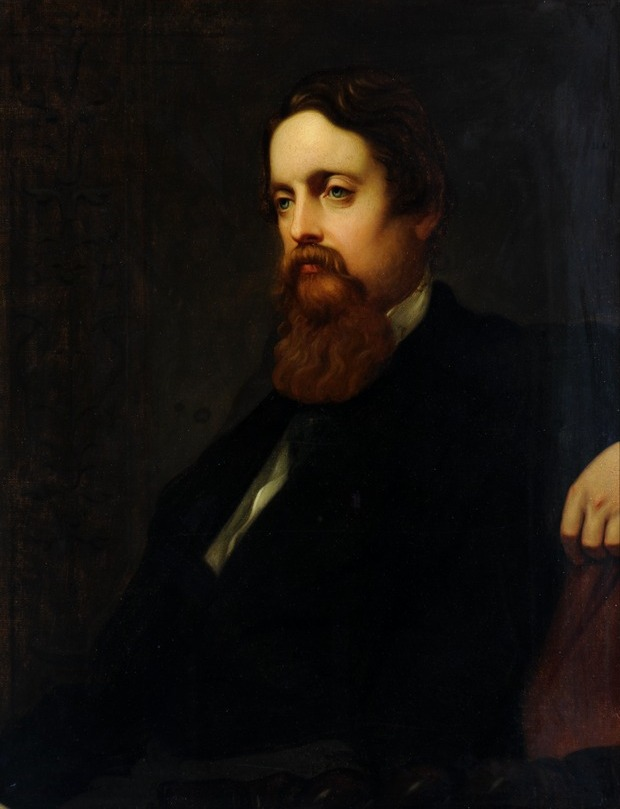
Portrait of Lord Frederick Cavendish by George Richmond

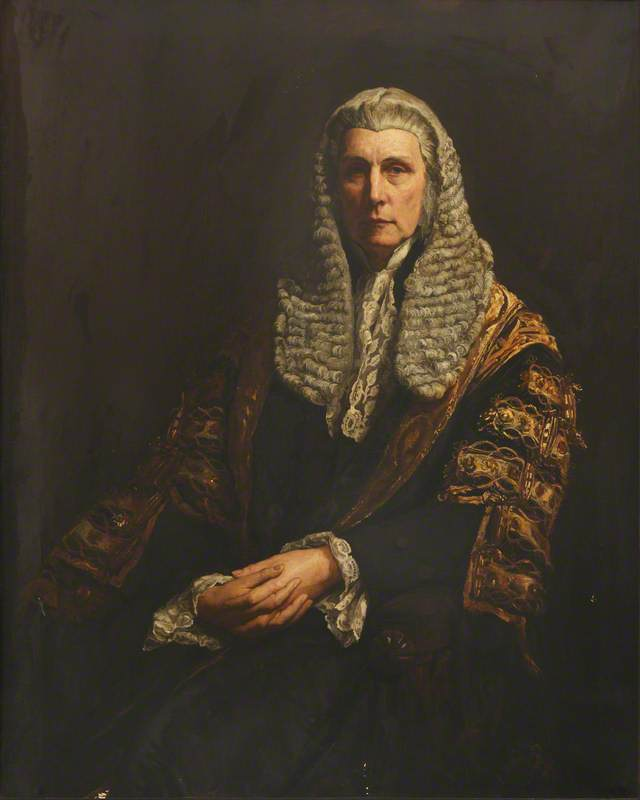
Portrait of Lord Selborne by Walter William Ouless

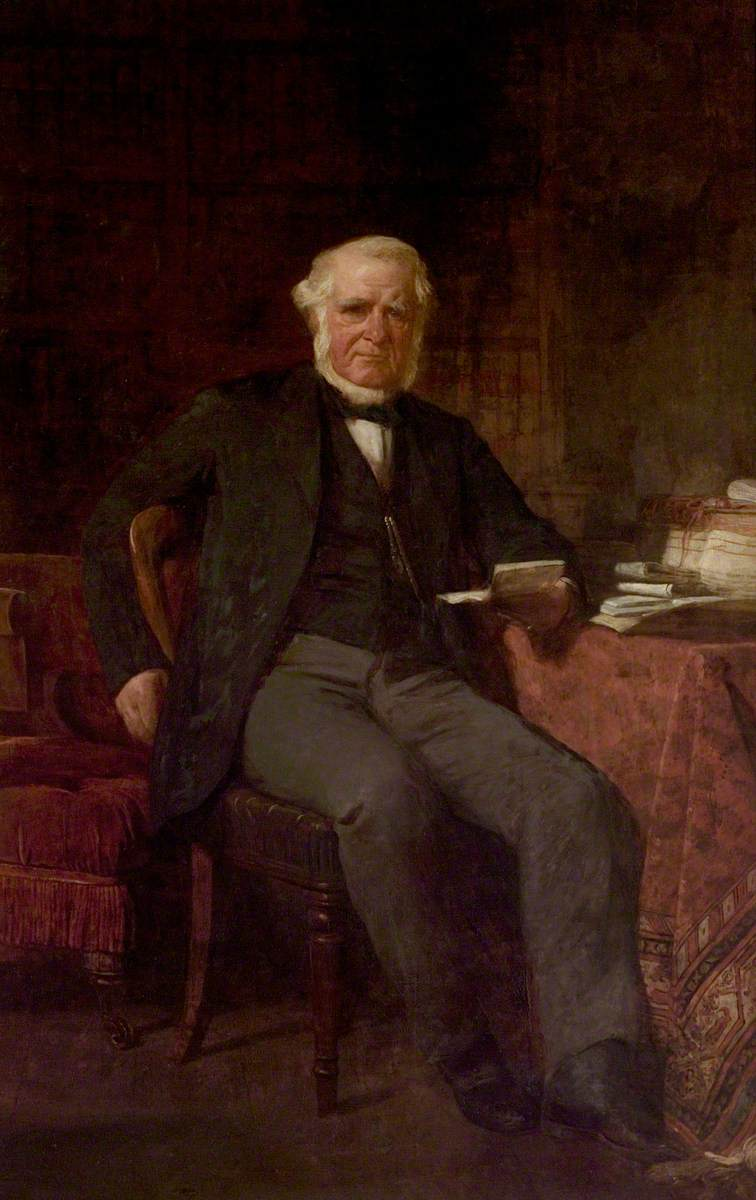
Portrait of John Remington Mills by Henry Tanworth Wells

== Bibliography ==
- Marshall, Nancy Rose & Warner, Malcolm. James Tissot: Victorian Life, Modern Love. Yale University Press, 1999.
