= The Queen of the Tournament =

Painting by Philip Hermogenes Calderon

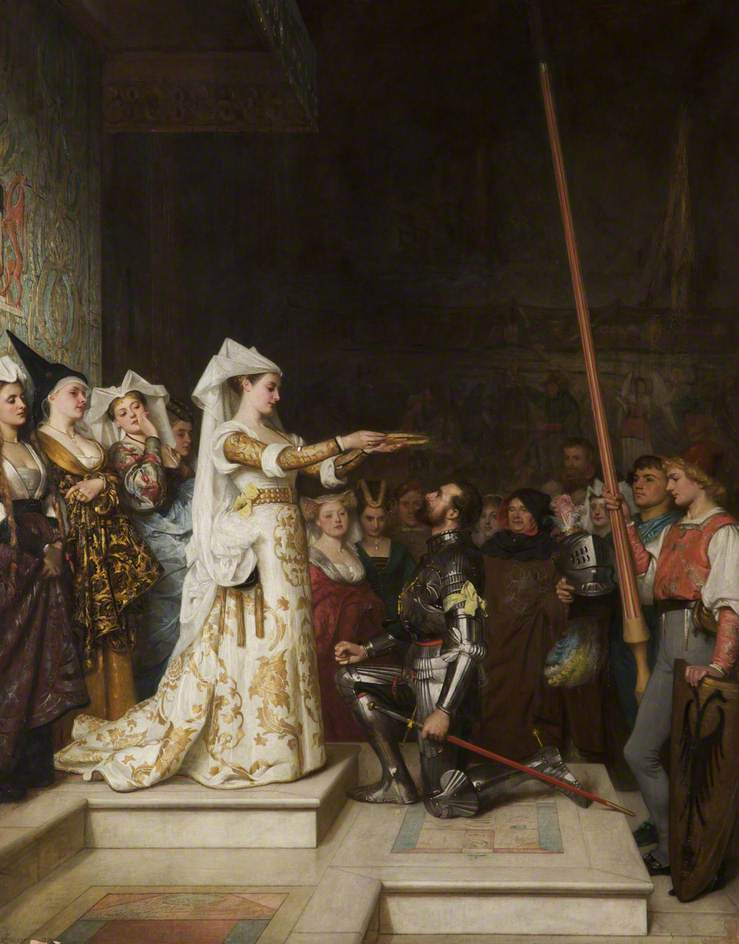
- Artist: Philip Hermogenes Calderon
- Year: 1874
- Type: Oil on canvas, history painting
- Dimensions: 142 cm × 112 cm (56 in × 44 in)
- Location: Salford Museum and Art Gallery, Greater Manchester

The Queen of the Tournament is an 1874 oil painting by the British artist Philip Hermogenes Calderon. A historical genre painting it shows a queen bestowing an honour on a knight following his success in a tournament during the a romanticesd Medieval era. Behind him stands his squire carrying his lance. The painting's style and theme typify the St John's Wood Clique of artists of which Cauldron was a prominent member.

The painting was displayed at the Royal Academy Exhibition of 1874 held at Burlington House in London. Today it is part of the collection of Salford Museum and Art Gallery in Greater Manchester, having been acquired in 1881.

== Bibliography ==
- Phillips, Catherine Gerard Manley Hopkins and the Victorian Visual World. Oxford University Press, 2007.
