= Salon of 1875 =

1875 art exhibition in Paris

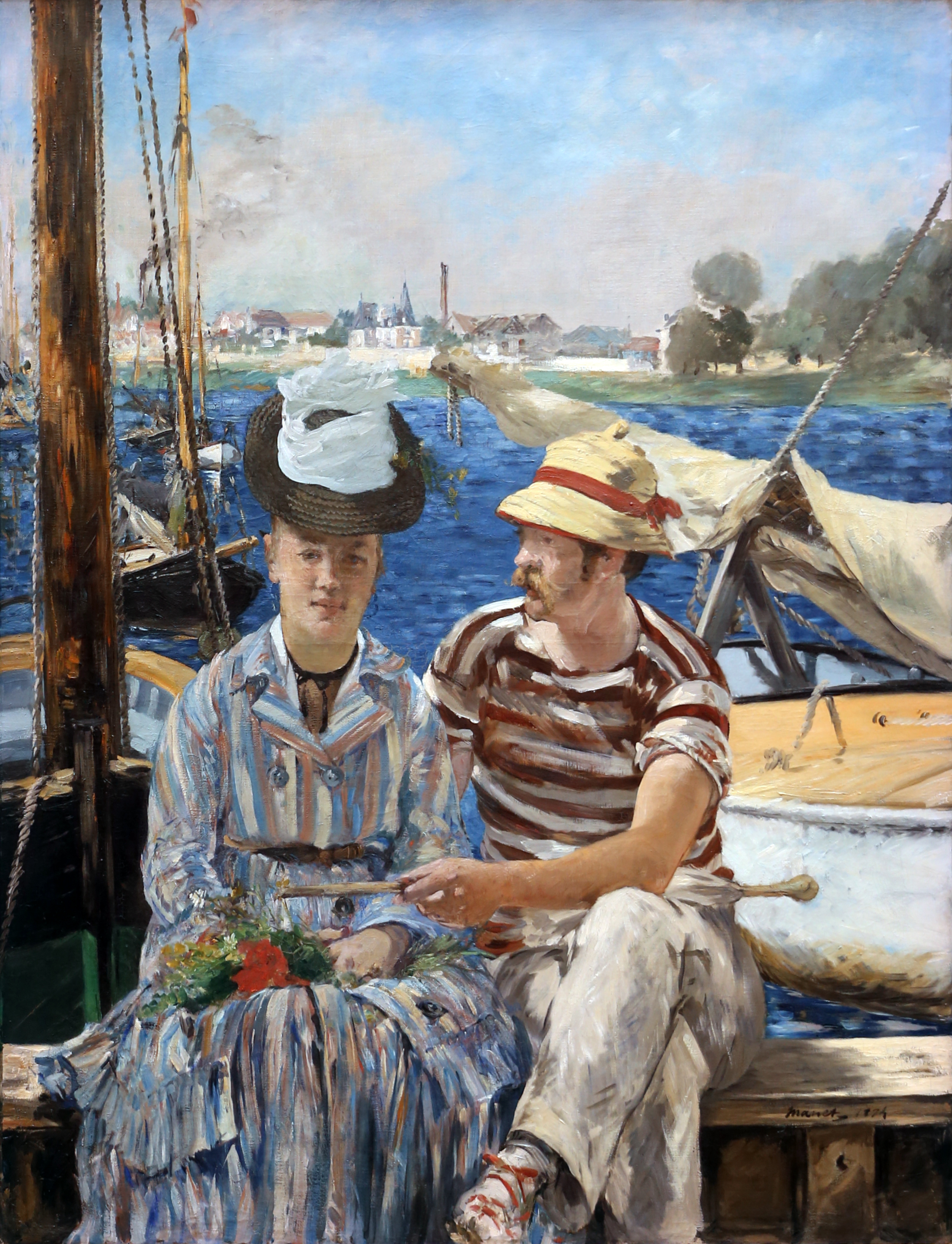
Argenteuil by Édouard Manet

The Salon of 1875 was an art exhibition held at the Palace of Industry in Paris from 1 May to 29 June 1875. It took place during the Belle Époque when Academic art was at its height. Traditionally the Salon was the undisputed premier exhibition held in France, but a Salon des Refusés was held that year featuring works from the Impressionist movement.

Nonetheless, Édouard Manet featured at the Salon of 1875 with one his first overtly impressionistic work Argenteuil, depicting a couple by the River Seine. Jules Lefebvre was awarded a gold medal for Chloé, a nude painting featuring the naiad of the same name. It later became one of the best-known paintings in Australia.

Other works on display included Léon Bonnat's Portrait of the Madame Pasca featuring a depiction of a celebrated actress by Léon Bonnat. Alphonse Legros, a French painter based in Britain, displayed his genre painting The Tinker. Jean-Paul Laurens exhibited the history painting The Excommunication of Robert the Pious. Alexandre Cabanel's biblical painting Thamar showed the continued influence of Romanticism on his work. Fernand Cormon's The Death of Ravana combines Orientalism and the stylistic legacy of Romanticism which had been at its peak in the first half of the nineteenth century. The architect Ferdinand Dutert was awarded with a gold medal for his submitted designs.

== Gallery ==
The Tinker by Alphonse Legros

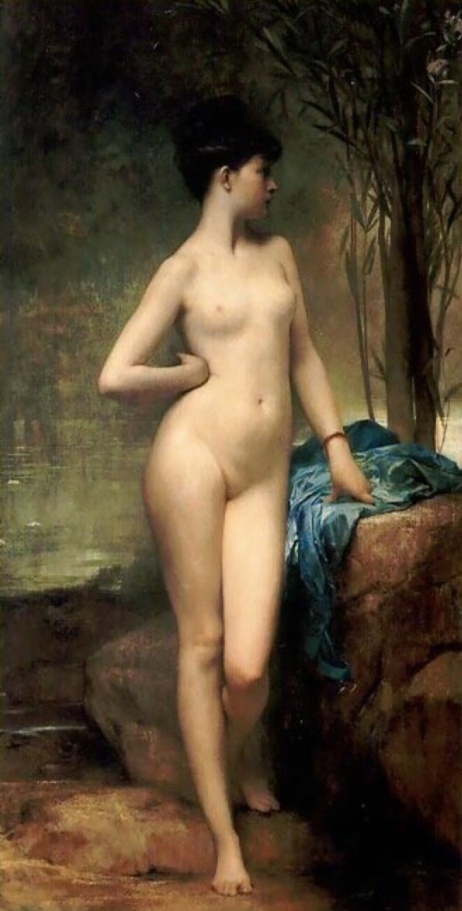
Chloé by Jules Lefebvre

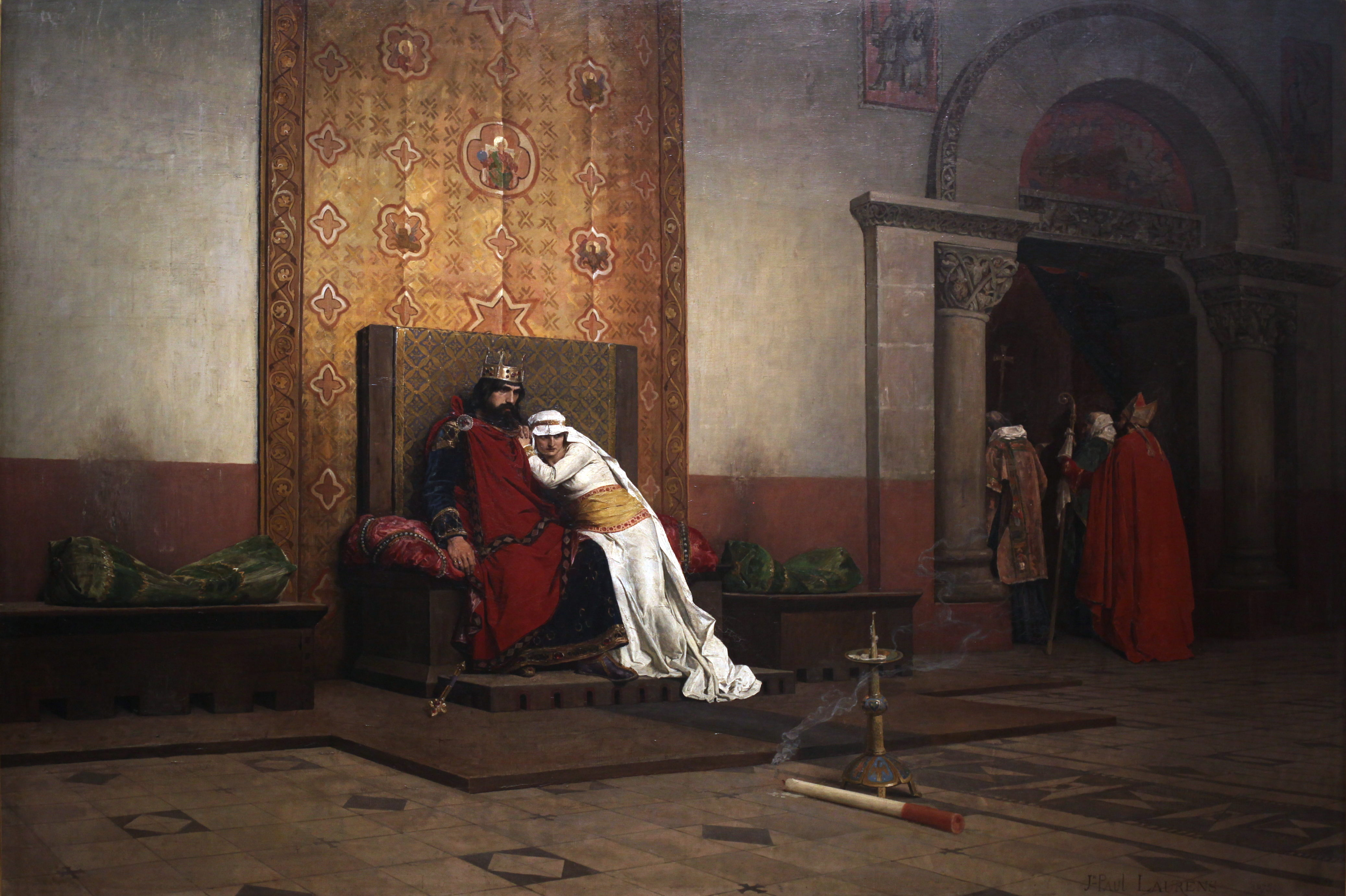
The Excommunication of Robert the Pious by Jean-Paul Laurens

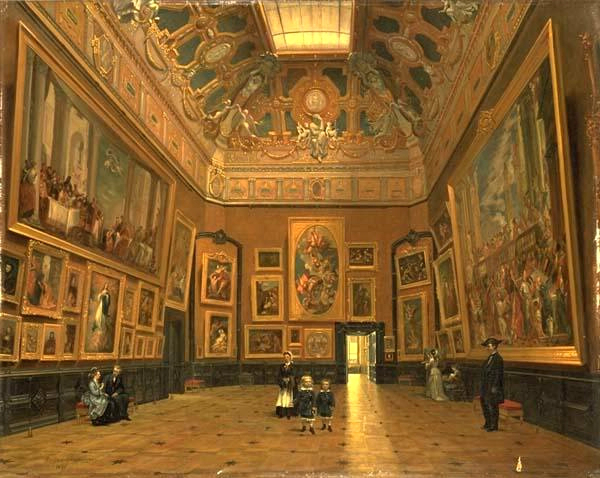
The Salon Carré of the Louvre by Lucien Przepiórski

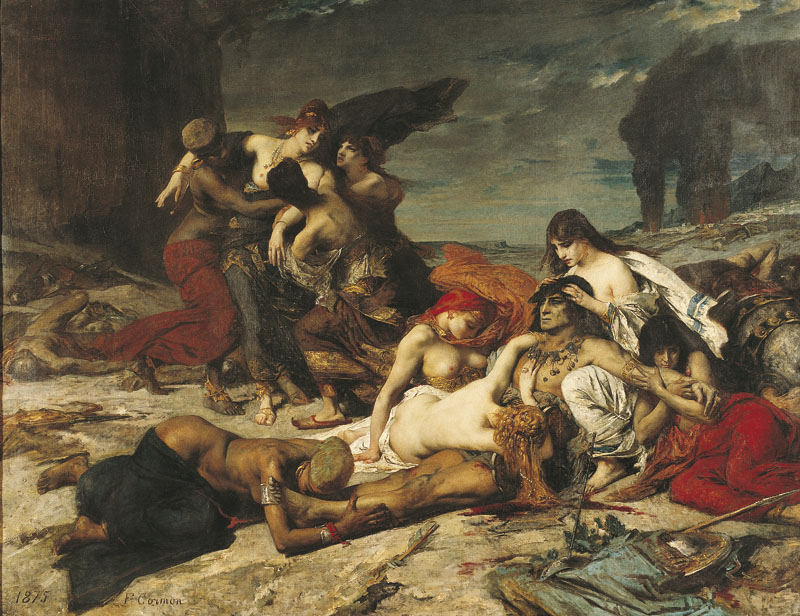
The Death of Ravana by Fernand Cormon

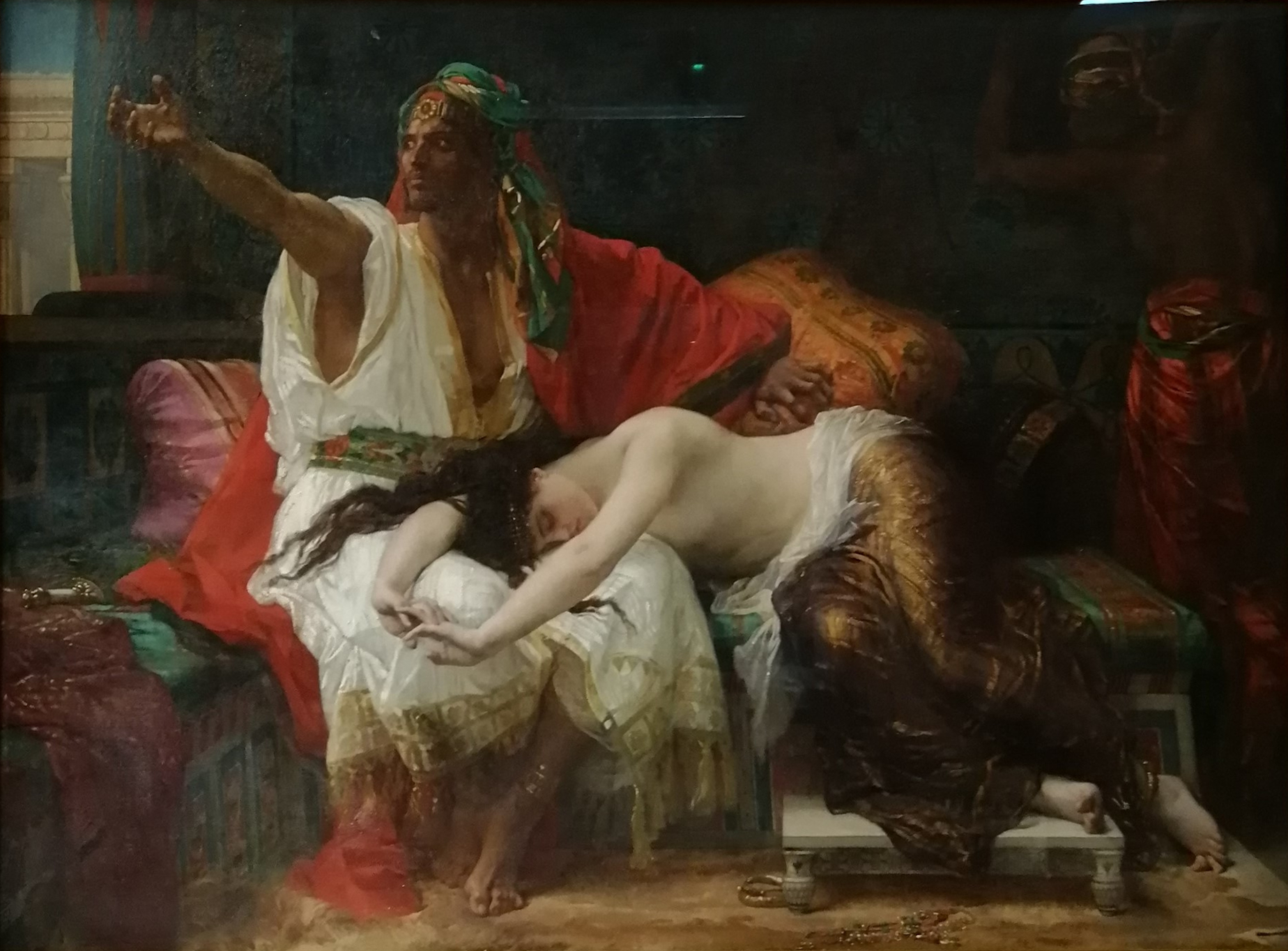
Thamar by Alexandre Cabanel

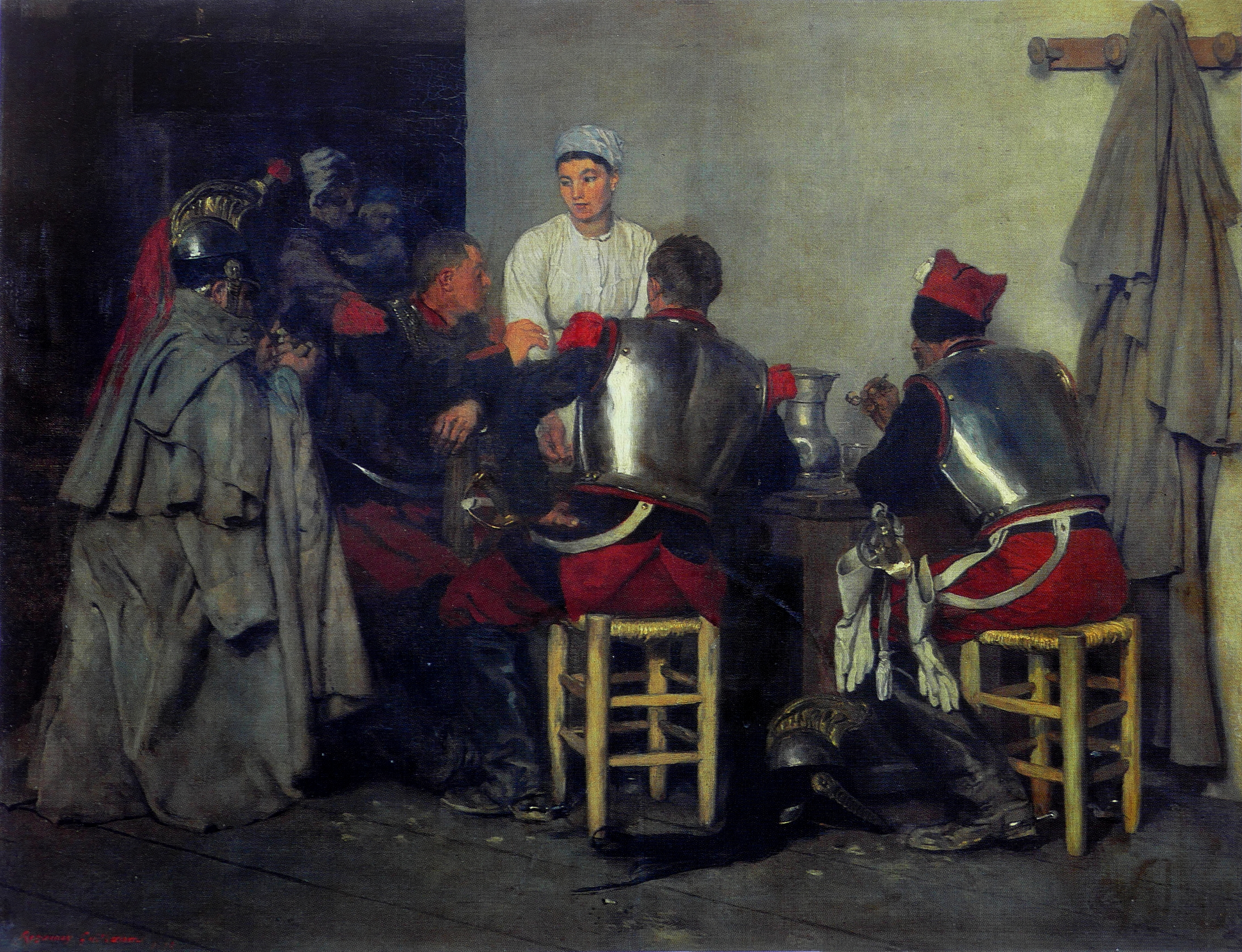
Cuirassiers au cabaret by Guillaume Urban Régamey

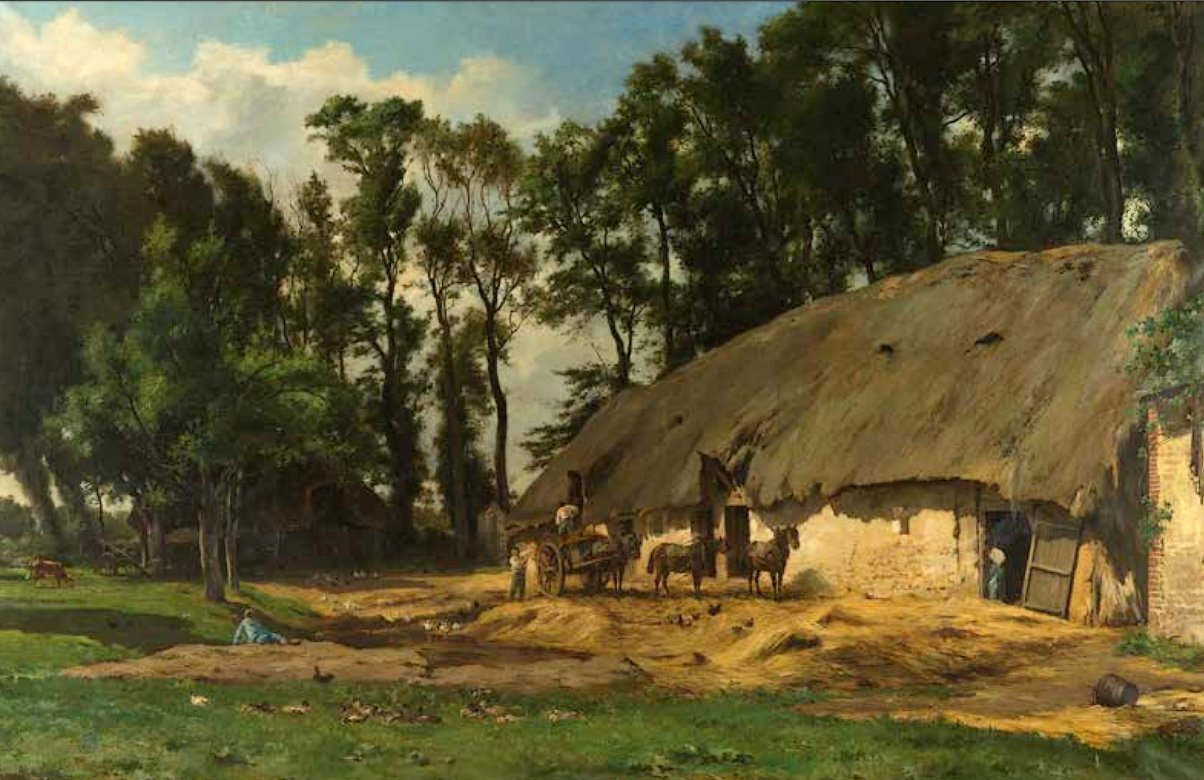
La Ferme Groult à Criquebeuf by Paul-Alfred Colin

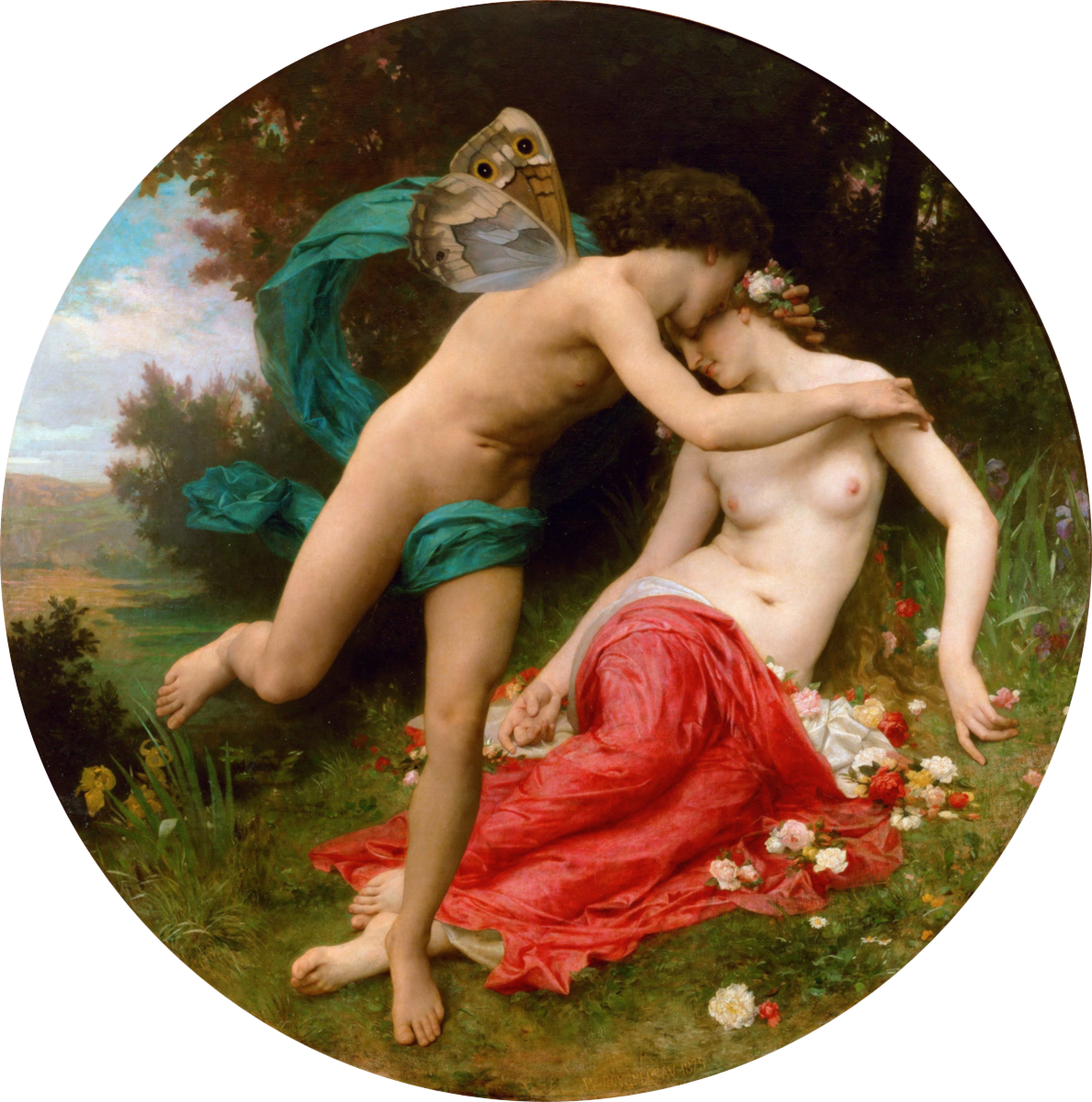
Flora and Zephyr by William-Adolphe Bouguereau

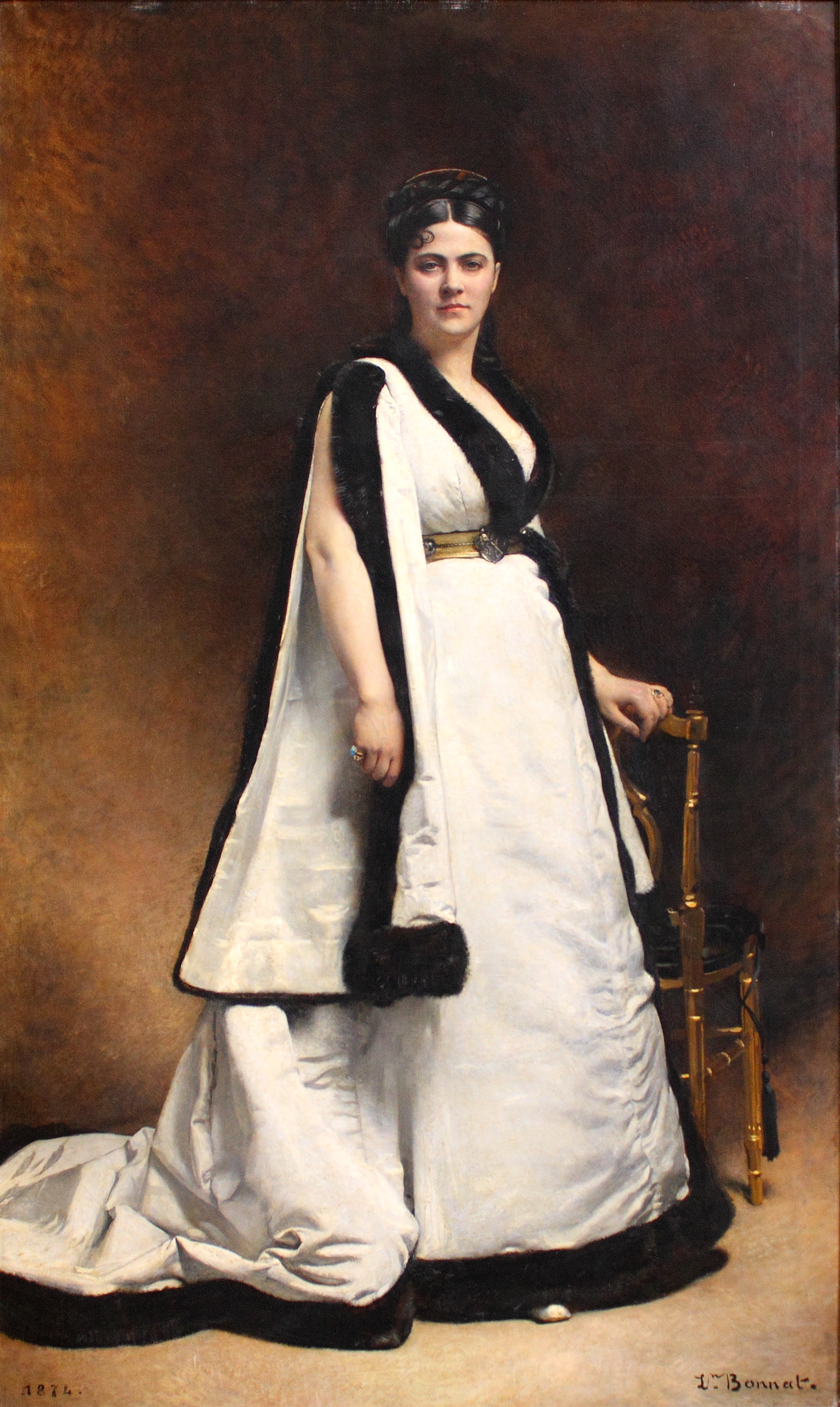
Portrait of Madame Pasca by Léon Bonnat

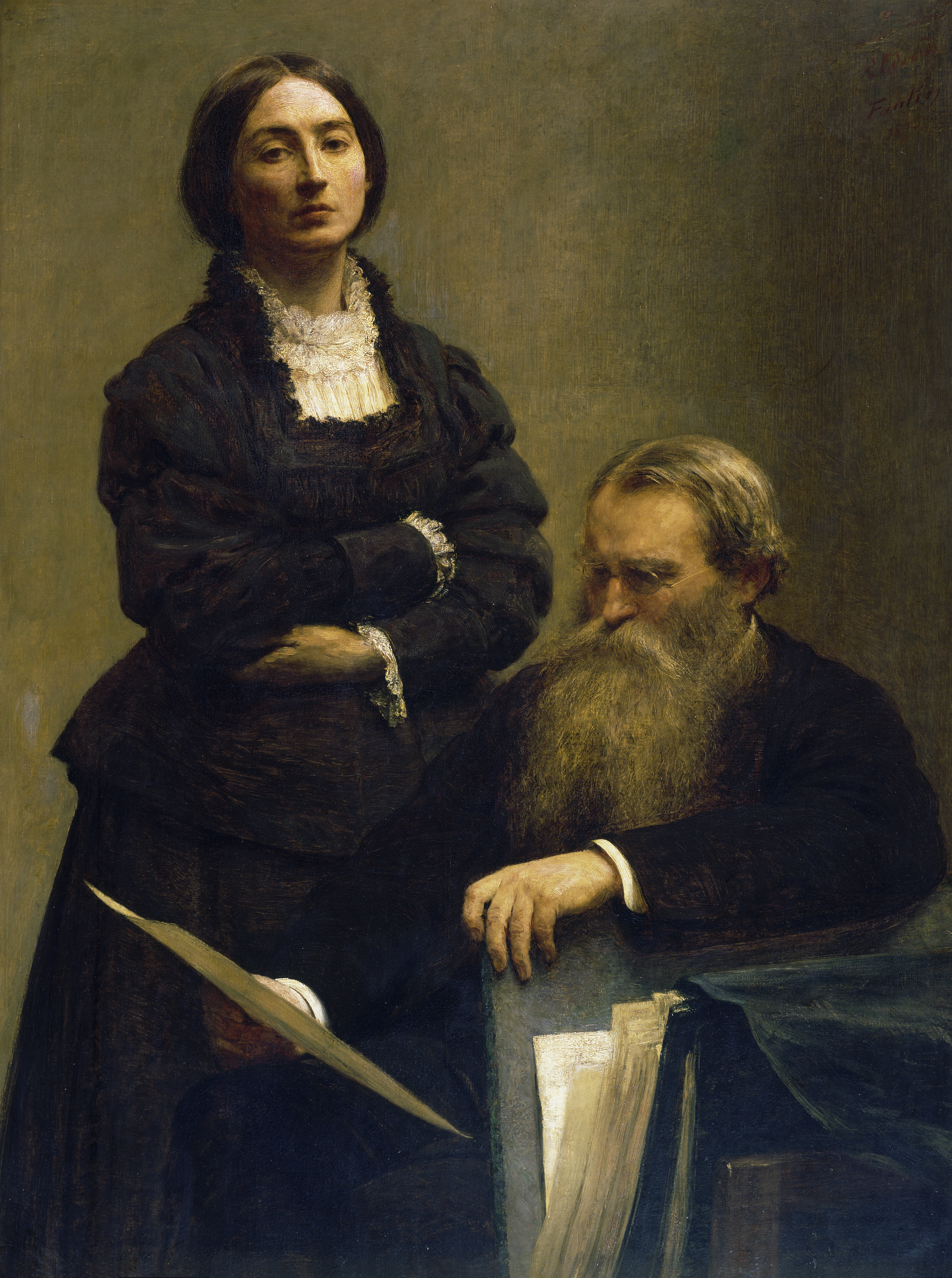
Portrait of Edwin Edwards and His Wife by Henri Fantin-Latour

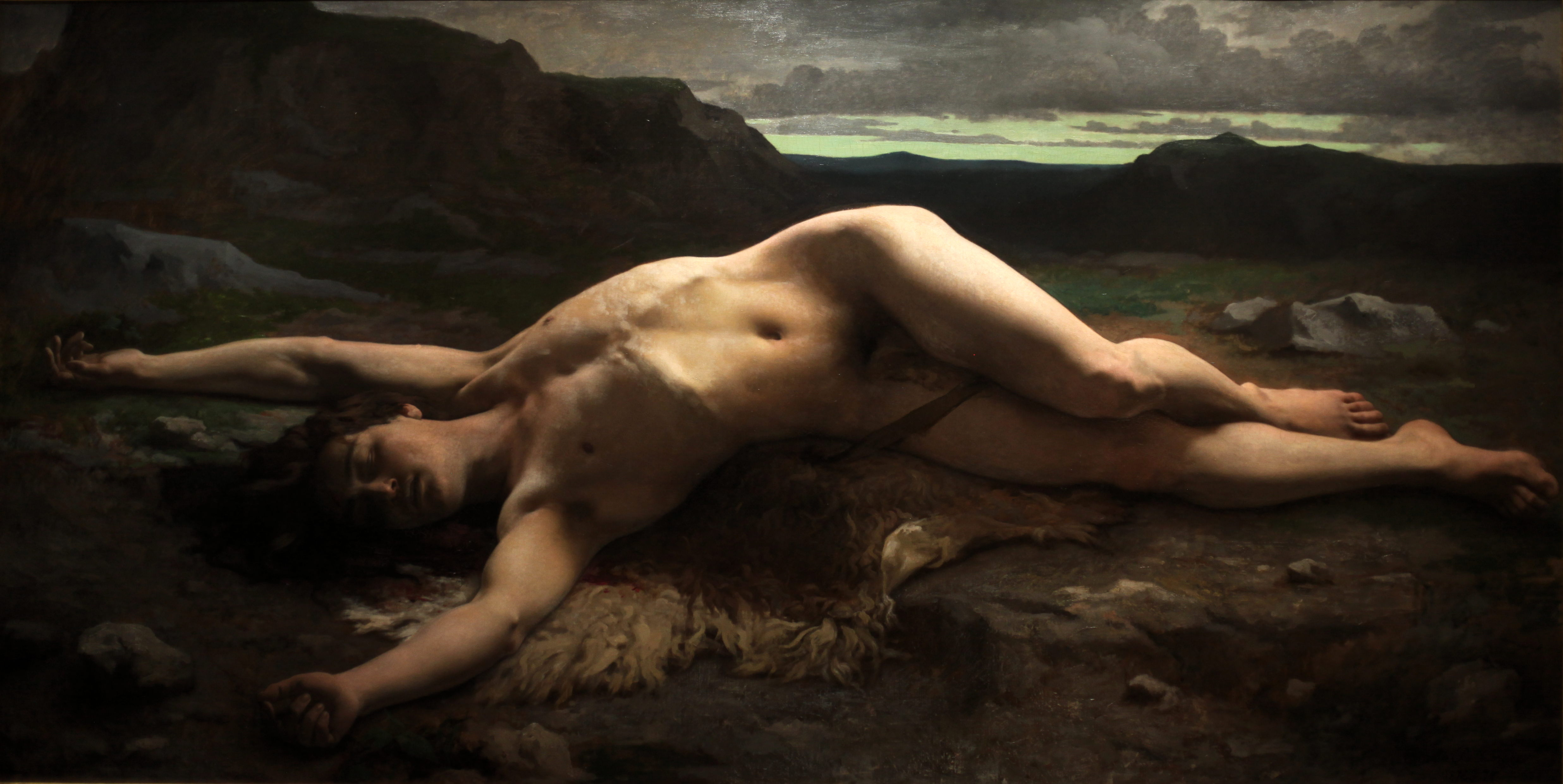
Abel by Camille Felix Bellanger

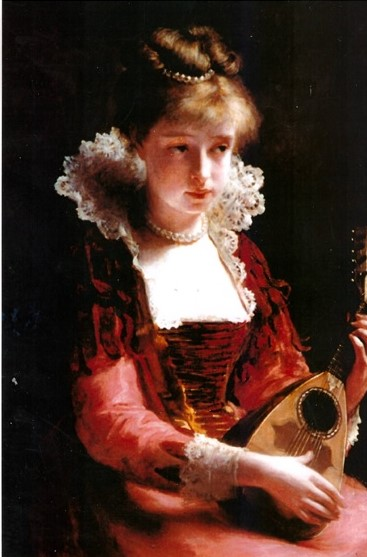
Mandolin Play by Pauline Laurens

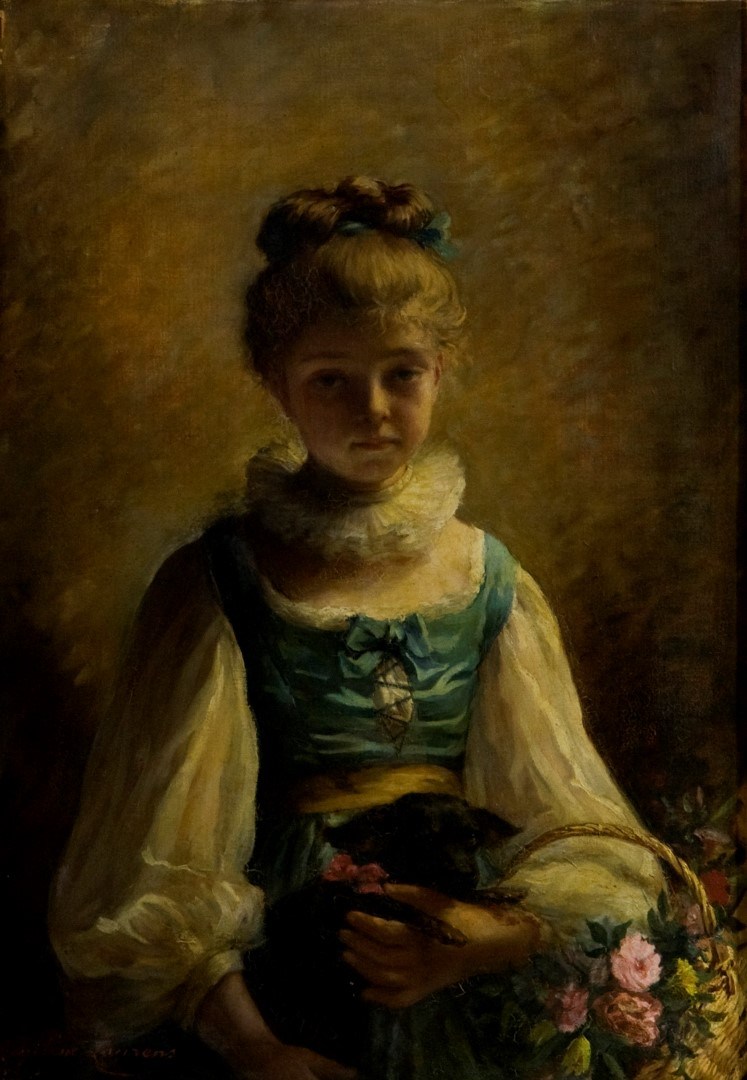
Rosette by Pauline Laurens

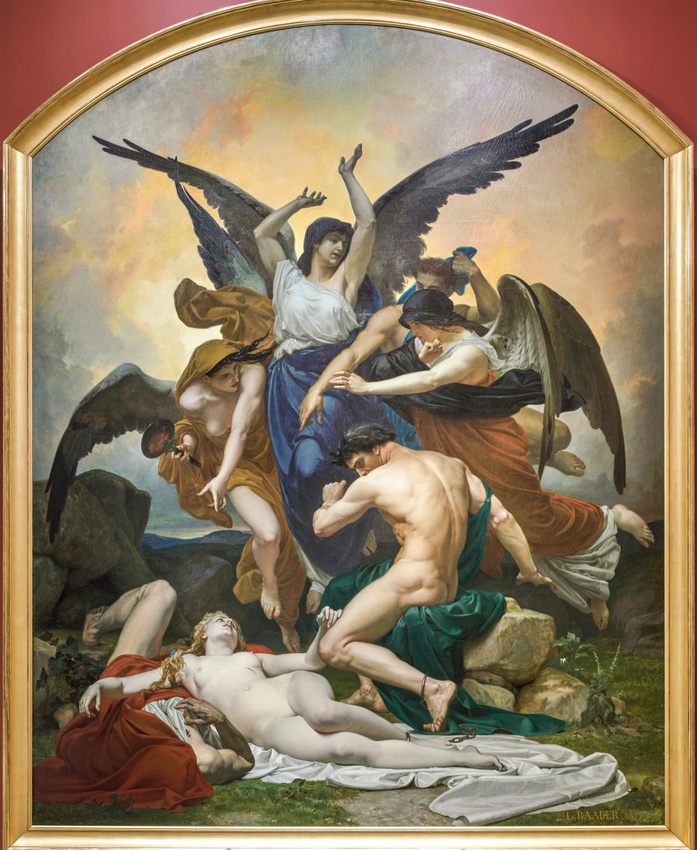
Remorse by Louis-Marie Baader

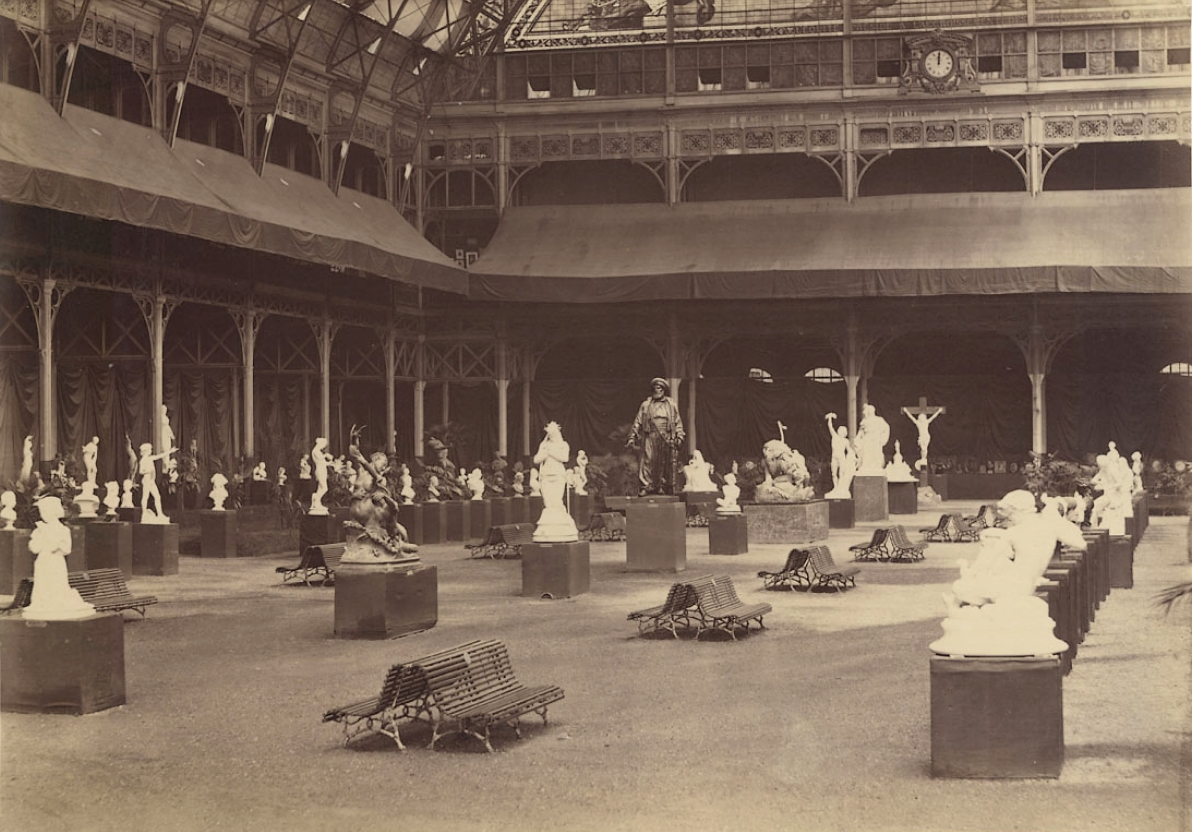
Photograph of the sculpture gallery at the Salon

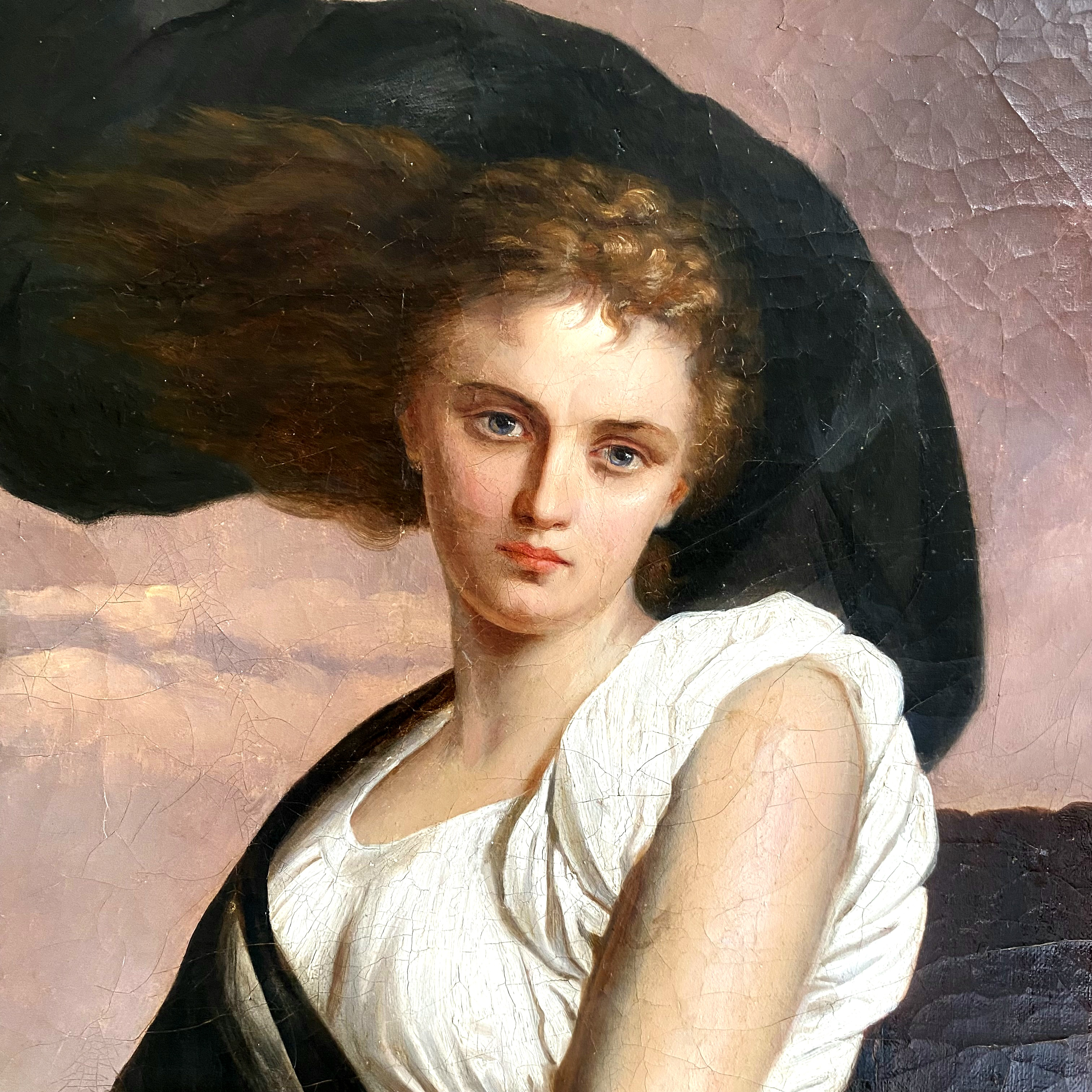

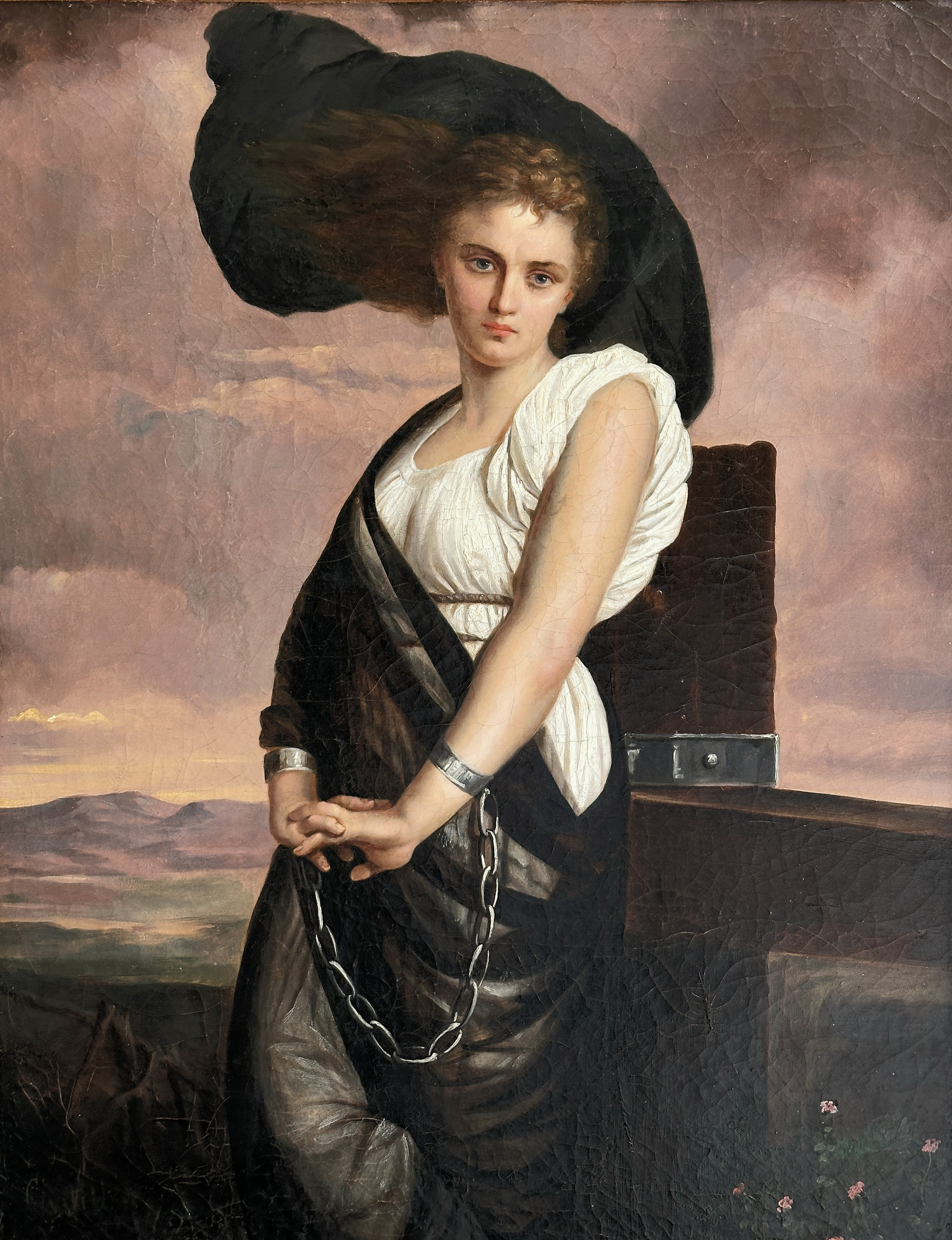
L'Esclave, original painting by Zoé-Laure de Châtillon, 1875, 59х46 sm, private collection

== See also ==
- Royal Academy Exhibition of 1875, held at Burlington House in London
- Category:Artworks exhibited at the Salon of 1875

== Bibliography ==
- Allard, Sébastien, Loyrette, Henri & Des Cars, Laurence. Nineteenth Century French Art: From Romanticism to Impressionism, Post-Impressionism and Art Nouveau. Rizzoli International Publications, 2007.
- Bowie, Ewen. Essays on Ancient Greek Literature and Culture: Volume 2, Comedy, Herodotus, Hellenistic and Imperial Greek Poetry, the Novels. Cambridge University Press, 2023.
- Brown, Marilyn. Gypsies and Other Bohemians: The Myth of the Artist in Nineteenth-century France. UMI Research Press, 1985.
- Cachin, Françoise & Moffett, Charles S. Manet, 1832–1883. Metropolitan Museum of Art, 1983.
- Durant, Stuart. Palais Des Machines. Phaidon Press, 1994.
