= Thomas Naghten Fitzgerald =

Sir Thomas Naghten FitzGerald CB (1 August 1838 – 8 July 1908) was an Irish-born Australian surgeon and academic.

== Early life ==
FitzGerald was born in Tullamore, Ireland, the son of John FitzGerald and his wife Catherine Naghten, née Higgins. FitzGerald was educated at St Mary's College, Kingstown, and the Ledwich School of Medicine, Dublin.

== Career ==
FitzGerald arrived in Melbourne, Australia in July 1858 as a ship's surgeon. After opening a private practice, FitzGerald was elected honorary surgeon to the Melbourne Hospital in 1860 and held that post until 1901. FitzGerald was a consulting surgeon in the Boer War in South Africa in 1900, for which services he was appointed a Companion of the Order of the Bath (CB) in Nov 1900.

FitzGerald also bred horses, one of which (Rhesus) won the Victorian Grand National Hurdle Race in 1882. FitzGerald owned the painting Chloé which now hangs in the Young & Jackson hotel.

He died on 8 July 1908, on board the S.S. Wyreema. He was buried in the Melbourne General Cemetery.

== Family ==
In 1870, he married Margaret Robertson, who died in 1890; they had three daughters.
