= The Tinker (painting) =

Painting by Alphonse Legros

- Artist: Alphonse Legros
- Year: 1874
- Type: Oil on canvas, genre painting
- Dimensions: 115 cm × 132.5 cm (45 in × 52.2 in)
- Location: Victoria and Albert Museum, London

The Tinker is an 1874 genre painting by the French artist Alphonse Legros. It depicts a tinker in the French countryside mending a cauldron with copper cooking pots lying nearby. Legros grew up in France and made his debut at the Salon of 1857, but settled in Britain in 1863.

The work was displayed at the Royal Academy Exhibition of 1874 at Burlington House in London's Piccadilly. It also featured at the Salon of 1875 in Paris and the inaugural Grosvenor Gallery Exhibition of 1877. It was bequeathed to the Victoria and Albert Museum in South Kensington by Constantine Alexander Ionides in 1901.

== Bibliography ==
- Brown, Marilyn. Gypsies and Other Bohemians: The Myth of the Artist in Nineteenth-century France. UMI Research Press, 1985.
- Roe, Sonia. Oil Paintings in Public Ownership in the Victoria and Albert Museum. Public Catalogue Foundation, 2008.
