= The Excommunication of Robert the Pious =

Painting by Jean-Paul Laurens

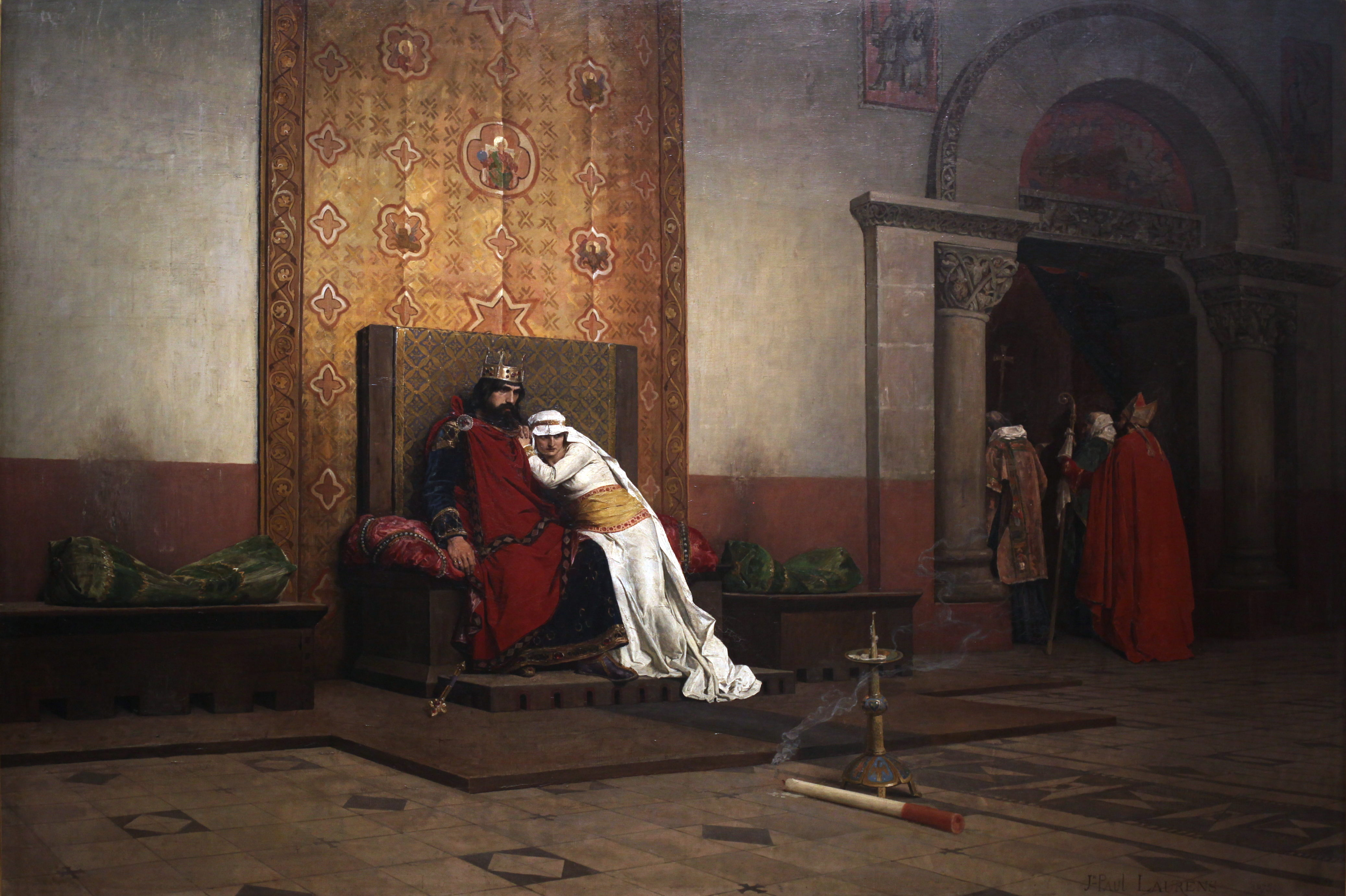
Excommunication of Robert the Pious (1875) by Jean-Paul Laurens

The Excommunication of Robert the Pious (French: L'Excommunication de Robert le Pieux) is an 1875 painting by Jean-Paul Laurens, held by the Musée d'Orsay, in Paris. It depicts the excommunication of Robert II of France in the year 998.

== History ==
The painting was exhibited at the Salon of 1875 and, together with Laurens' other work on display that year, L'Interdit, was generally reckoned to be the finest historical paintings entered. It was bought from the artist by the State in 1875, and exhibited at the Luxembourg Museum until 1929, when it was transferred to the Louvre. It has belonged to the collections of the Musée d'Orsay since 1982.

The work was Laurens' first after his visit to Italy, which influenced his technique. His use of colour in this painting is noticeably less sober and more animated than in his previous work. It was one of a series of historical paintings by Laurens that depicted various parts of the narrative of Robert the Pious. These were L'Interdit (1875), showing France being placed under interdict for his refusal to end his relationship with his wife Bertha, and Répudiation de la reine Berthe (1883), showing their eventual parting.

== Interpretation ==
The painting depicts the moment after the excommunication of Robert II by Pope Gregory V for refusing to repudiate his second wife, Berthe. Robert was both her second cousin and godfather to her son.

As the representatives of the papacy leave the throne room, Robert and Bertha stare into space, in the grip of their dilemma. The royal scepter lies on the ground, and the candle which has been blown out and placed on the ground, as provided for in the ritual of excommunication, is still smoking. The austere decor of the room offers little to distract the viewer from the faces of the two protagonists as they stare with foreboding at the smoking candle before them. They are completely alone, the entire court having abandoned them. Their expressions give an indication of the terrifying scene they have just witnessed. Jules Claretie described it as exactly like a theatrical scene, and the work as not so much a painting as a moment before the curtain falls.
