= Chloé (Lefebvre) =

1875 painting by Jules Lefebvre

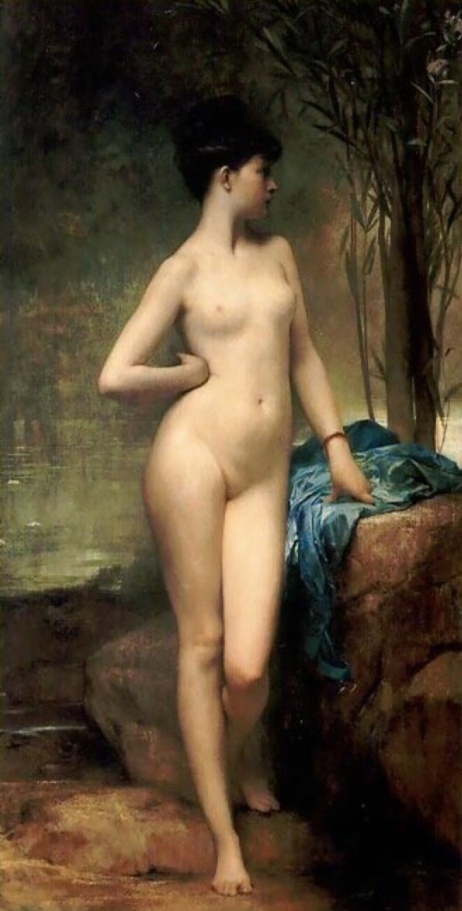
- Artist: Jules Lefebvre
- Year: 1875
- Medium: Oil on canvas
- Dimensions: 260 cm × 139 cm (100 in × 55 in)
- Location: Young and Jackson Hotel, Melbourne

Chloé is an 1875 oil painting by French academic painter Jules Lefebvre. Measuring 260 cm by 139 cm, it depicts the naiad in "Mnasyle et Chloé", a poem by the 18th-century French poet André Chénier.

The painting hangs in the Young and Jackson Hotel in Melbourne, Australia, where it has been since 1909. One of the most popular paintings on display in Melbourne, Chloé is considered an icon of the city, and was the mascot of the Royal Australian Navy frigate HMAS Melbourne.

== History ==
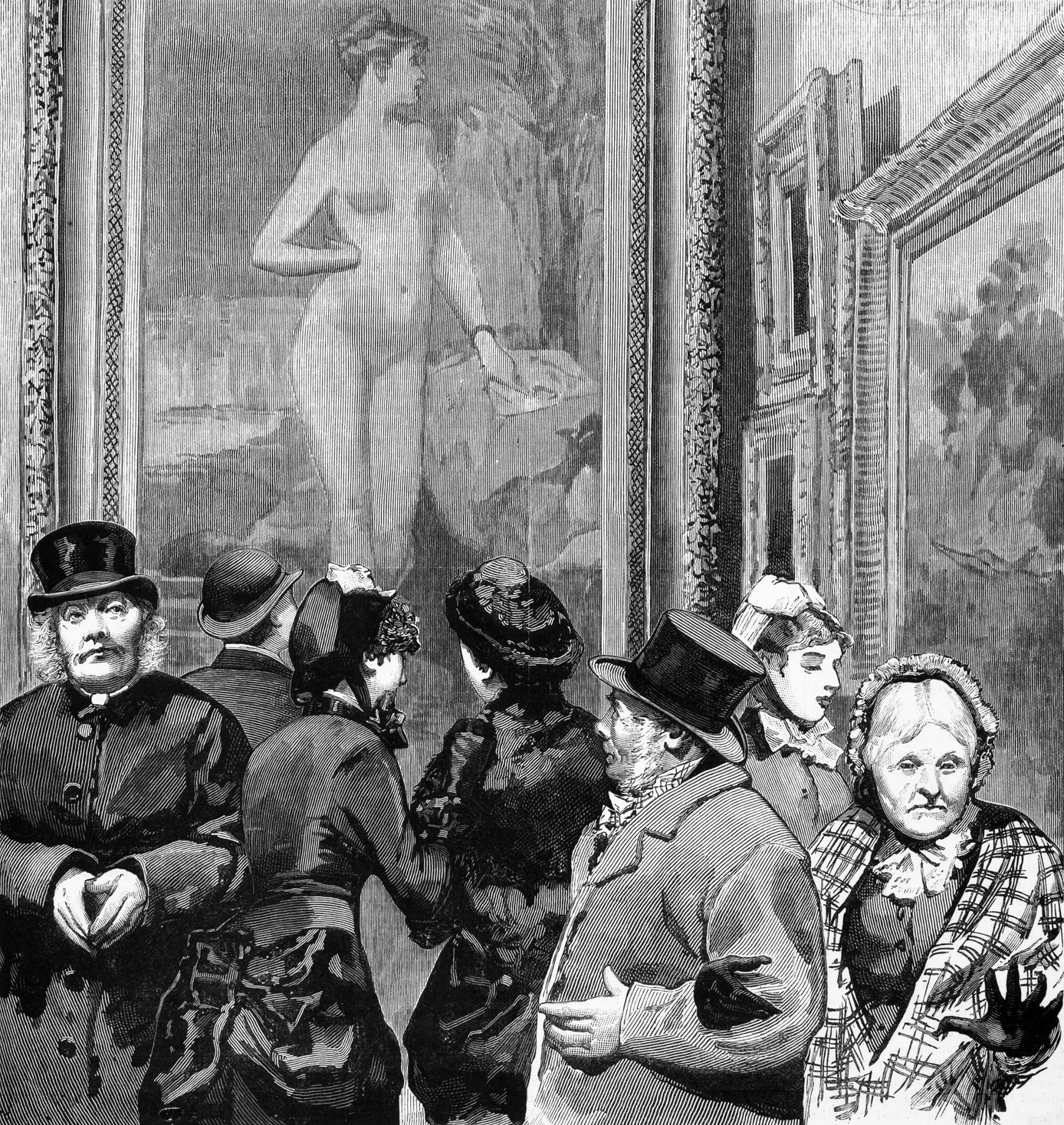
Chloé on display at the National Gallery of Victoria, 1883

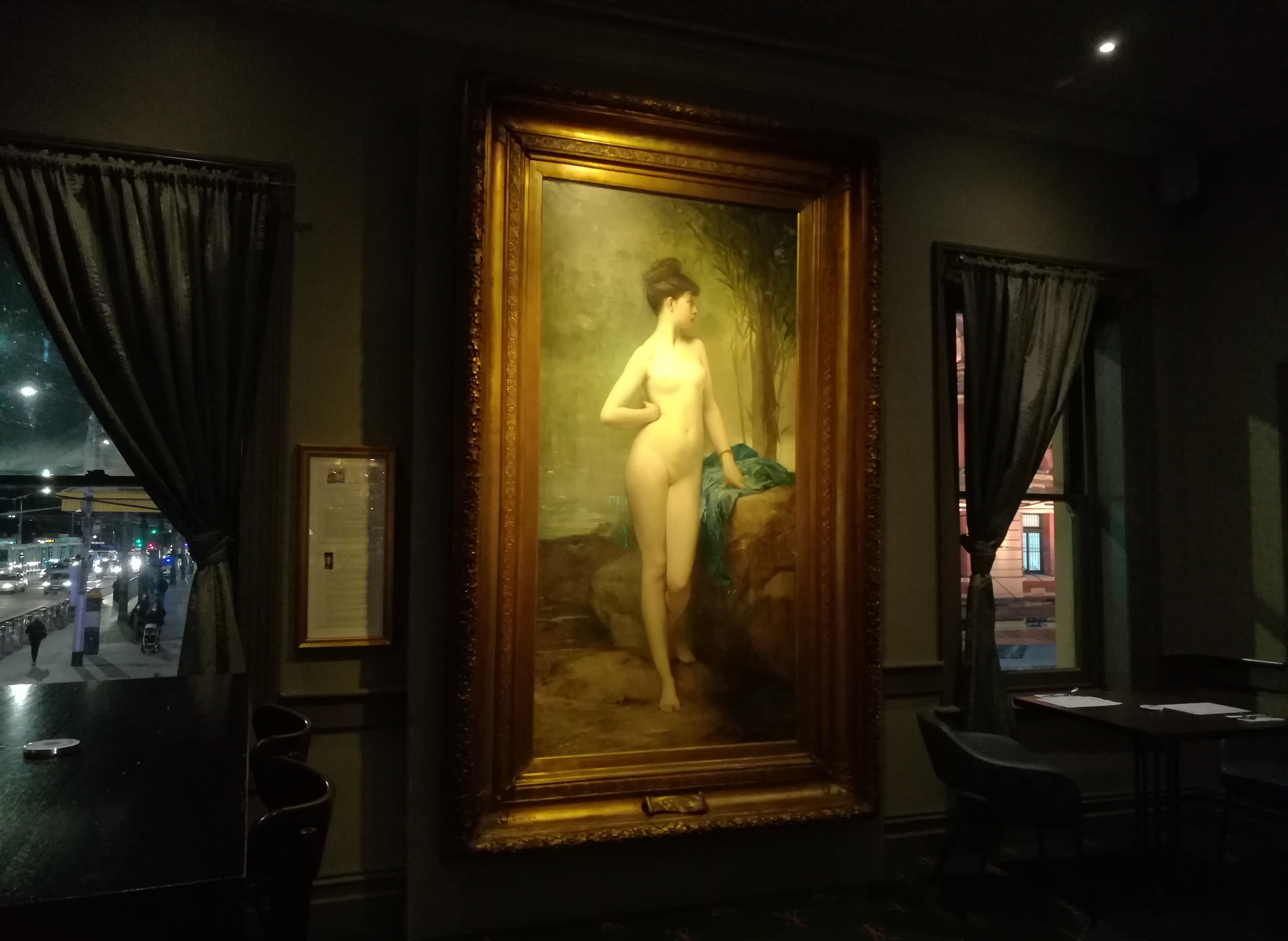
Chloé at the Young and Jackson Hotel

Chloé made its debut at the Paris Salon of 1875, where it drew critical praise. It was subsequently displayed in Australia at the 1879 Sydney International Exhibition and the Melbourne International Exhibition.

Chloé was then purchased by Dr Thomas Fitzgerald of Lonsdale Street, Melbourne, for 850 guineas. In 1883, Fitzgerald loaned the painting to the National Gallery of Victoria, which had recently opened on Sundays for the first time. As the only full female nude on display at the gallery, Chloé drew criticism from advocates of Sabbatarianism, so it was taken down after only three weeks. In response, members of the bohemian artists' society, the Buonarotti Club, protested to the press, including artist Alexander Colquhoun, who wrote satirical verse urging the gallery to rehang the painting.

Upon Fitzgerald's death in 1908, the painting was purchased at auction by Henry Figsby Young, owner of the Young and Jackson Hotel. In 1908, Young installed the painting in the hotel's saloon bar. Chloé is to remain part of the hotel indefinitely, as decided by the National Trust and Heritage of Victoria in 1988.

=== Influence on soldiers ===
Chloé captivated many soldiers who frequented the bar of Young and Jackson's Hotel during World War I, World War II, the Korean War and the Vietnam War. Letters were addressed to her from the trenches in Turkey, France, and Papua New Guinea, promising to return to her. American soldiers even went as far as coming up with a plan to abduct her.

== Identity of the model ==
The model who posed for the painting has been the subject of much speculation and mythologising, with many accounts depicting her as having had a love affair with Lefebvre, and committing suicide after he declined to marry her. Such stories are believed to be the result of many decades of bar-room gossip at the Young and Jackson Hotel.

An ardent admirer of Chloé since its debut at the 1875 Paris Salon, American journalist Lucy Hamilton Hooper travelled to Lefebvre's studio to ask him about the painting. She quoted him as saying that, after completing the painting, he traveled abroad for a few months, and on his return learned that the model had died:

She was a girl of more refinement and elevation of sentiment than is usually to be found among persons of her position, and, being in the hands of a gang of low confederates, they had attempted to force her into a way of life from which her soul revolted. Thus driven to despair, the poor child poisoned herself by washing phosphorus from friction matches, and then swallowing the decoction.

The only other first-hand account of the model, and her possible identity, is Irish writer George Moore's in his 1886 memoir Confessions of a Young Man. According to Moore, the model's name was Marie, and he met her through the Symbolist painter Louis Welden Hawkins. According to Moore, "no one knew why" the model committed suicide, but said there were rumours it was due to unrequited love.

== Another painting ==
Mention was made in The Argus on 5 March 1887 of another painting of Chloé at the second annual exhibition of the Australian Artists' Association at Buxton's art gallery in Swanston Street;

Mr. J. C. Waite sends in a ... half-length figure entitled Chloe, which is stated to be a portrait of the young lady who sat to M. Lefebvre as a model for the picture of the same name. It is a charming head and face, with the roundness, freshness, and bloom of youth in the countenance, and a look of innocence and simplicity, which is not always associated with the female models of Parisian artists.

On the basis of that report researcher Katrina Kell surmises that if the painting, like others in the Association's exhibition, had "been done during the last six months" as stated at the opening, then Chloé may have lived, and been painted by Waite, in Melbourne.

In 1908 the same artist, James Clarke Waite, who had studied for a year in Paris, showed (likely the same) "charming portrait of the model who sat for the much discussed picture Chloé" of which the Herald newspaper assures readers "who have objection to studies in the nude, will be pleased to learn that in this work Chloe appears fully clothed in modern dress." A 1914 Herald report of exhibitions by Waite notes the success of his show at the Athenaeum with purchases made "by Mr [Henry Figsby] Young, who, years ago, bought Lefevre's [sic] Chloe, the property of the late Sir Thomas Fitzgerald, and has now purchased Mr Waite's portrait of the same beautiful French girl." The painting is not known to have survived in Young's possession as many of Waite's paintings were reportedly destroyed five years after his death in a fire at the Melbourne Town Hall in 1925.

== Exhibitions ==
- Paris Salon Exhibition, 1875
- Sydney International Exhibition, 1879
- Melbourne International Exhibition, 1880
- Adelaide Gallery Exhibition, 1883–1886
- Blamey House Women's Auxiliary
- Fundraiser, 1940
- National Gallery of Victoria 1883, 1995, 2000

== Awards ==
- 1879 – Won highest award at the Sydney International Exhibition
- 1880 – Won highest award at the Melbourne International Exhibition

== Damage and restoration ==
On Friday, 24 September 2004, at 8:30 pm, a hotel patron fell against the painting and caused long vertical cracks in its 5-millimetre (0.2 in)-thick protective glass. Art experts said the damage was minor and would not affect the overall value of the painting. It was repaired at the Ian Potter Conservation Centre in the Ian Potter Museum of Art in Melbourne, where it waited for protective German glass to be imported, and was restored to the hotel bar on 13 October 2004.

== In popular culture ==
Chloe, a novel by Western Australian novelist Katrina Kell.
