= Remorse (painting) =

Painting by Louis-Marie Baader

Le Remords
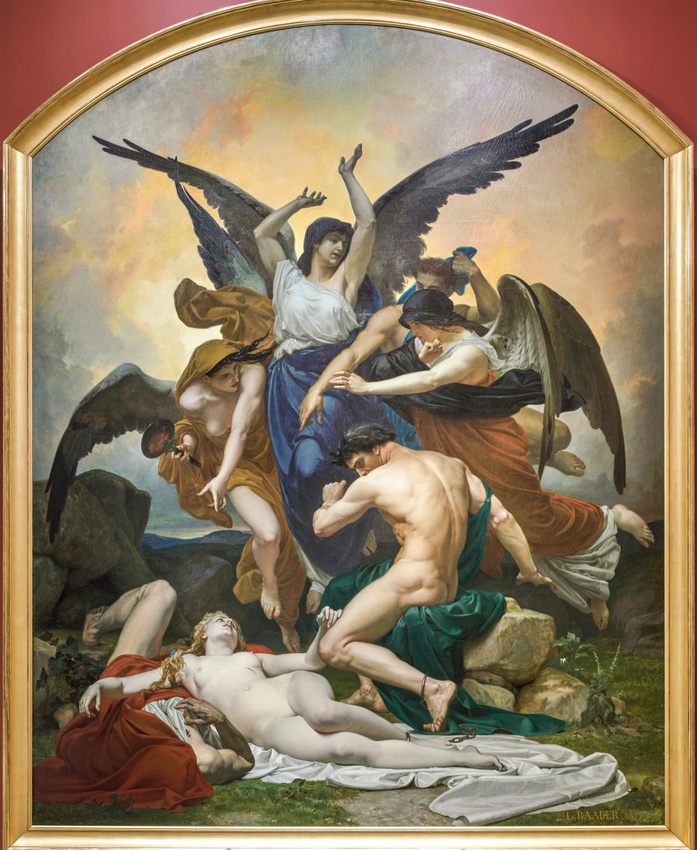
- Artist: Louis-Marie Baader
- Year: 1875
- Dimensions: 376 cm × 295 cm (148 in × 116 in)
- Location: Musée d'Orsay; Paris

Remorse (French: Le Remords) is an oil on canvas painting by Louis-Marie Baader. It is a very large canvas, 376 cm (148 in) high and 295 cm (116 in) wide. It was first exhibited at the Salon of 1875 and was purchased by the state from the artist.

== Subject ==
The painting depicts an episode from Greek mythology. Orestes avenges the murder of his father Agamemnon by his mother Clytemnestra and her lover Aegisthus by killing them both. In the moment captured in the painting, Orestes looks down in horror at the bodies of the couple he has just murdered, while around him crowd the Erinyes. By painting both Orestes and Clytemnestra nude, Baader demonstrated his mastery of anatomy to the Academy and appealed to the public at the Salon, who were fond of sensual nudity.

== History ==
When first purchased, the painting was displayed in the Museum of Fine Arts, Dole. It remained there until 1980, when it was assigned to the Louvre and then placed in the collection of the Musée d’Orsay. It was not placed on display there however due to its extremely poor condition. There were tears and deformations of the canvas, alterations to the original paint, and widespread cracking. The painting was restored for the thirty year anniversary of the museum in 2016. The work was carried out in the galleries, inside a glass enclosure, so that the restorers could work in full view of the public. After restoration it was loaned to the Kunsthalle der Hypo-Kulturstiftung in Munich for the 2017-18 special exhibition Gut · Wahr · Schön. Meisterwerke des Pariser Salons aus dem Musée d'Orsay.

== Critical reception ==
Lucien Dubois praised the canvas for its drawing technique and use of colour, but complained that, like most allegorical paintings, its meaning was not clear. Luc-Olivier Merson considered it an outstanding work and regretted that the jury had not awarded it a medal at the 1875 Salon.
