= Madame Pasca =

French actress

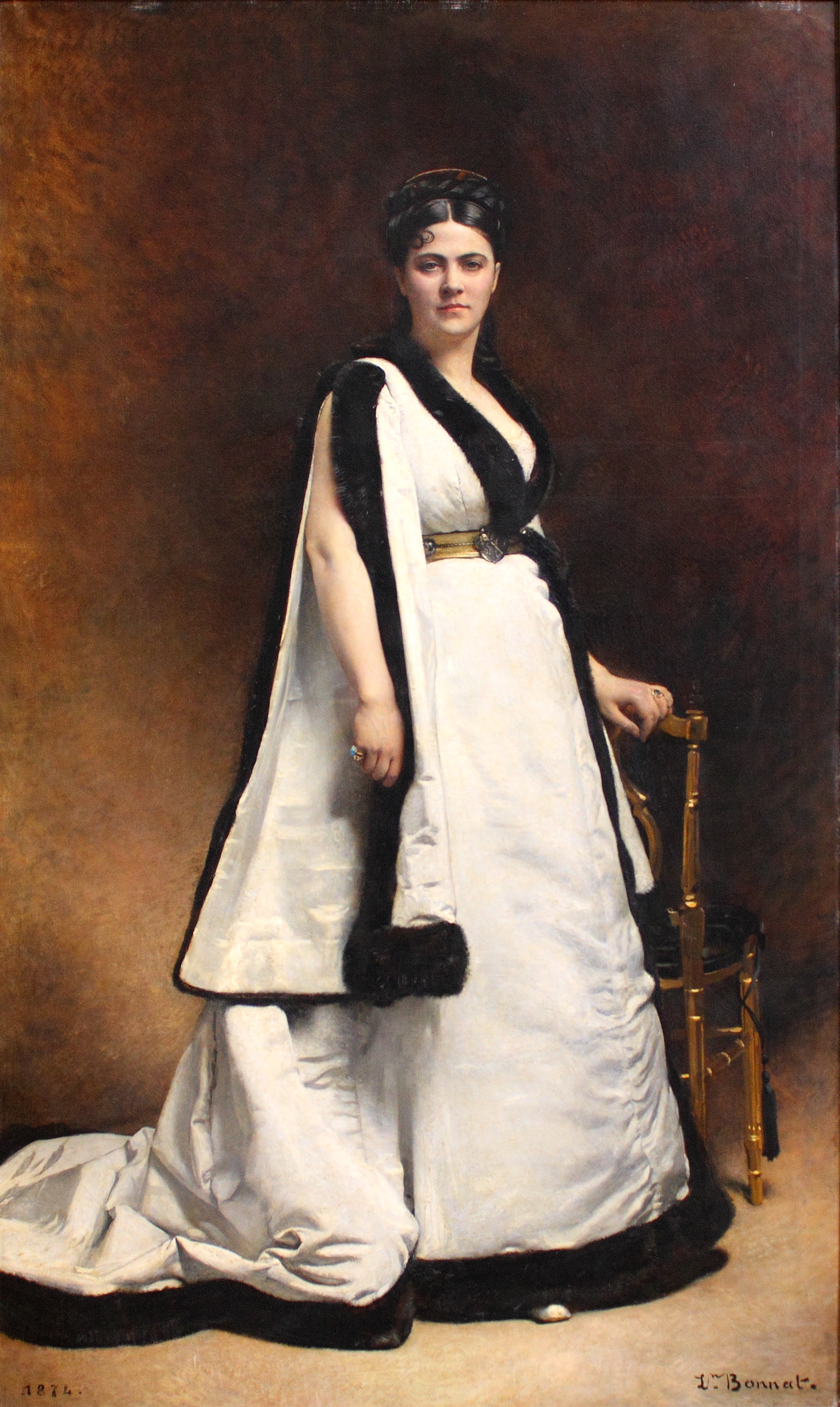
- Pasca painted in 1874 by Léon Bonnat.
- Born: Alice Marie Angèle Pasquier; November 16, 1833; Lyon, France
- Died: May 25, 1914 (aged 80); Paris, France
- Occupation: Stage actress

Alice Marie Angèle Pasquier (November 16, 1833 – May 25, 1914), better known by her stage name Madame Pasca and also known as Alix-Marie Pasquier, was a French stage actress.

== Life and career ==
Pasca was born on November 16, 1833, in Lyon to Jeanne-Marie-Antoinette-Eugénie Morin and Louis-Joseph Séon, a merchant. She took singing lessons from François Delsarte, but had limited vocal range and was encouraged by Delsarte to pursue acting instead.

She married M.Pasquier in 1855 and when a widow she first appeared as an actress at the Gymnase in Paris in 1864.

As an actress, Pasca received significant critical attention. The Gentleman's Magazine and Historical Review described her as the "queen, by right of self-culture, of the Salon."

She died on May 25, 1914, in Paris.
