= Young and Jackson Hotel =

Historic pub in Melbourne, Victoria, Australia

Young and Jackson
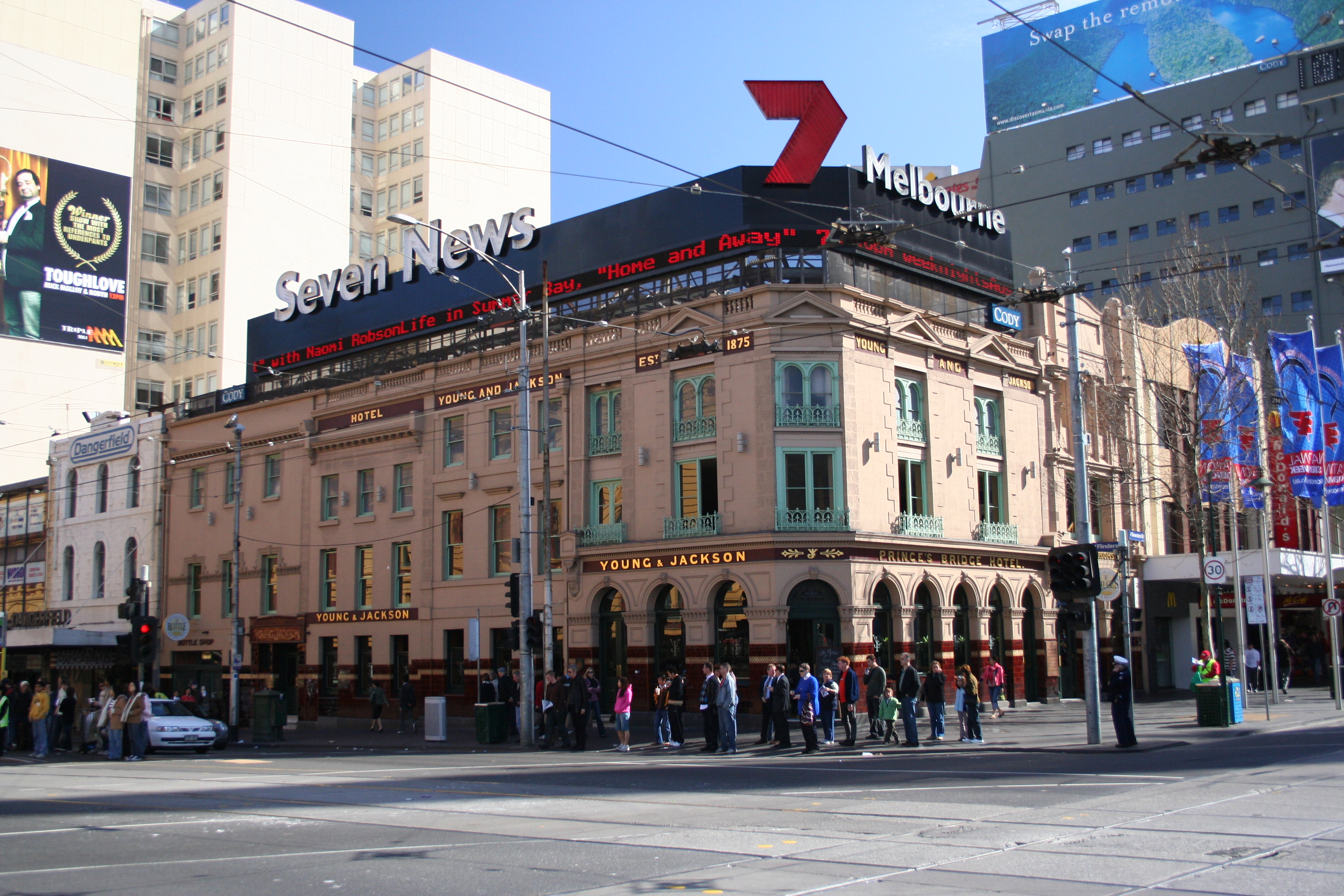

General information
- Location: Corner of Flinders and Swanston Streets, Melbourne, Australia
- Coordinates: 37°49′02″S 144°58′00″E
- Opened: 1 July 1861 (The Princes Bridge Hotel); 1875-Present (Young and Jackson Hotel)

Other information
- Number of rooms: 5
- Number of restaurants: 2
- Number of bars: 4
- Public transit: Flinders Street station Tram routes 35, 70, 75

Website
- www.youngandjacksons.com.au

Victorian Heritage Register
- Official name: Young and Jackson's Princess Bridge Hotel
- Type: State Registered Place
- Designated: 31 May 1989
- Reference no.: H0708
- Heritage Overlay number: HO744

Young and Jackson is a hotel in Melbourne, Victoria, Australia, at the corner of Flinders Street and Swanston Street. Established in 1861, it is listed on the Victorian Heritage Register.

== History ==
The site was purchased by John Batman, one of the founders of Melbourne, in 1837 at the fledgling settlement's first Crown land sale. Batman had a home built on the site for his children, which became a schoolhouse in 1839. Warehouses were erected on the site after the schoolhouse was razed in 1853. The Princes Bridge Hotel opened there on 1 July 1861 by John P. Toohey and his brother who later went on to found the Tooheys Beer brand. The Hotel was renamed to Young and Jackson after the Irish diggers who took it over in 1875, cousins Henry Figsby Young (b. 1849 Dublin, Ireland - d. 29 September 1925) and Thomas Joshua Jackson (b. 1834 - d. 9 May 1901). The freehold was owned by the Koegh family for 123 years until it was purchased by Marcel Gilbert in 1979.

The hotel is an amalgamation of five separate buildings of two and three storeys, with the original 1853 bluestone building designed as a three-storey residence, with a butcher's shop on the ground floor. It was later extended in both directions, with all buildings rendered and painted to match each other by the 1920s. Since the 1920s the exterior hotel has been dominated by large advertising signs, even to this day. It is owned by the Endeavour Group.

== Chloé ==
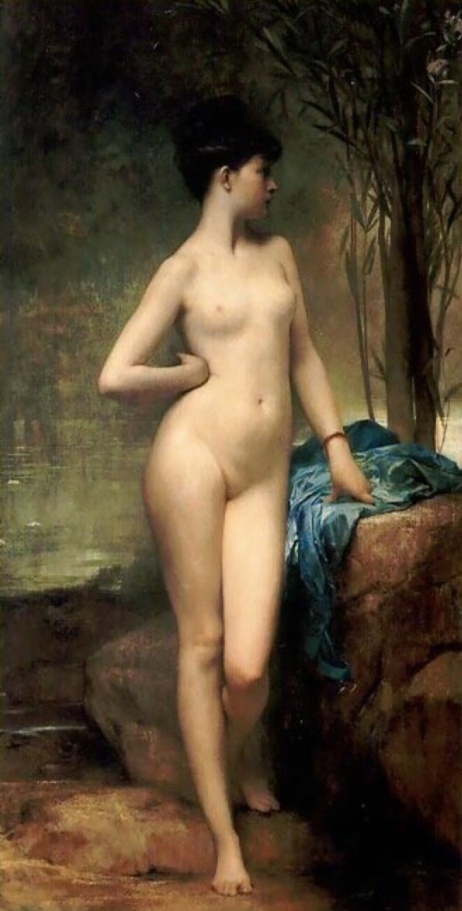
Chloé by Jules Joseph Lefebvre

The hotel is well known for the nude painting Chloé, painted by French artist Jules Joseph Lefebvre in 1875. The painting is oil on canvas measuring a life size 260 x 139 cm. It was purchased for 850 guineas by Dr Thomas Fitzgerald of Lonsdale Street in Melbourne. After being hung in the National Gallery of Victoria for three weeks in 1883, it was withdrawn from exhibition because of the uproar created especially by the Presbyterian Assembly. It was bought for the Young and Jackson Hotel in 1908 for 800 pounds, and was damaged in 1943 by an American serviceman who threw a glass of beer at it.

== See also ==
- List of public houses in Australia
