= Louis-Marie Baader =

French painter (1828–1920)

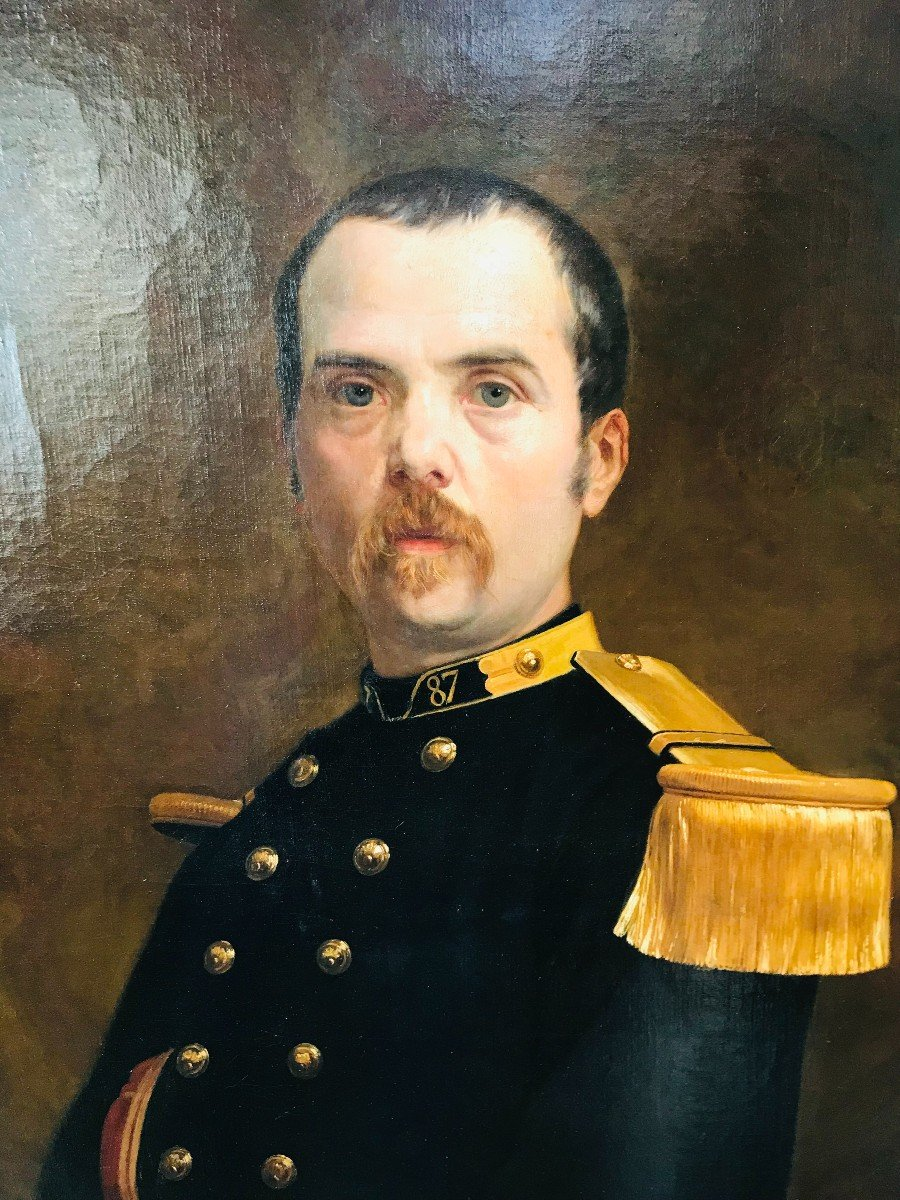
Self-Portrait of an officer Louis-Marie Baader, dated around his period at 19th century

Louis-Marie Baader (20 June 1828, Lannion – 2 December 1920, Morlaix) was a French painter of German descent. He is the son of a German musician, during his servings in comte (English: count) of Jacques Boudin de Tromelin's regiment. His Norman wife, the count saw Louis-Marie's as an artistic potential early, and with his support, he entered the École des beaux-arts in Paris in 1848, at the studio of Adolphe Yvon's. Initially, he gained several church and private commissions, but he only exhibited at the Paris Salon from 1857 to 1914. In 1866, he won a medal for Hero and Leander and a third class medal as well in 1874 for Posthumous Glory, allowing him to sell several paintings to the French state.

He worked for a long time as a history painter, but later moved into genre work, especially on Breton life, before ending his career painting military history paintings.

He eventually died while being unmarried in 1920, and his burial is in the cementer of Saint-Charles in Morlaix, France.

== See also ==
- Remorse (Baader painting)

== Sources ==
- Durox Cyrielle and Riou Béatrice, Au Salon ! Louis-Marie Baader (1828-1920), exhibition catalogue, Musée de Morlaix, juin 2013, 120p.
