= Pauline Laurens =

French painter (1850–1941)

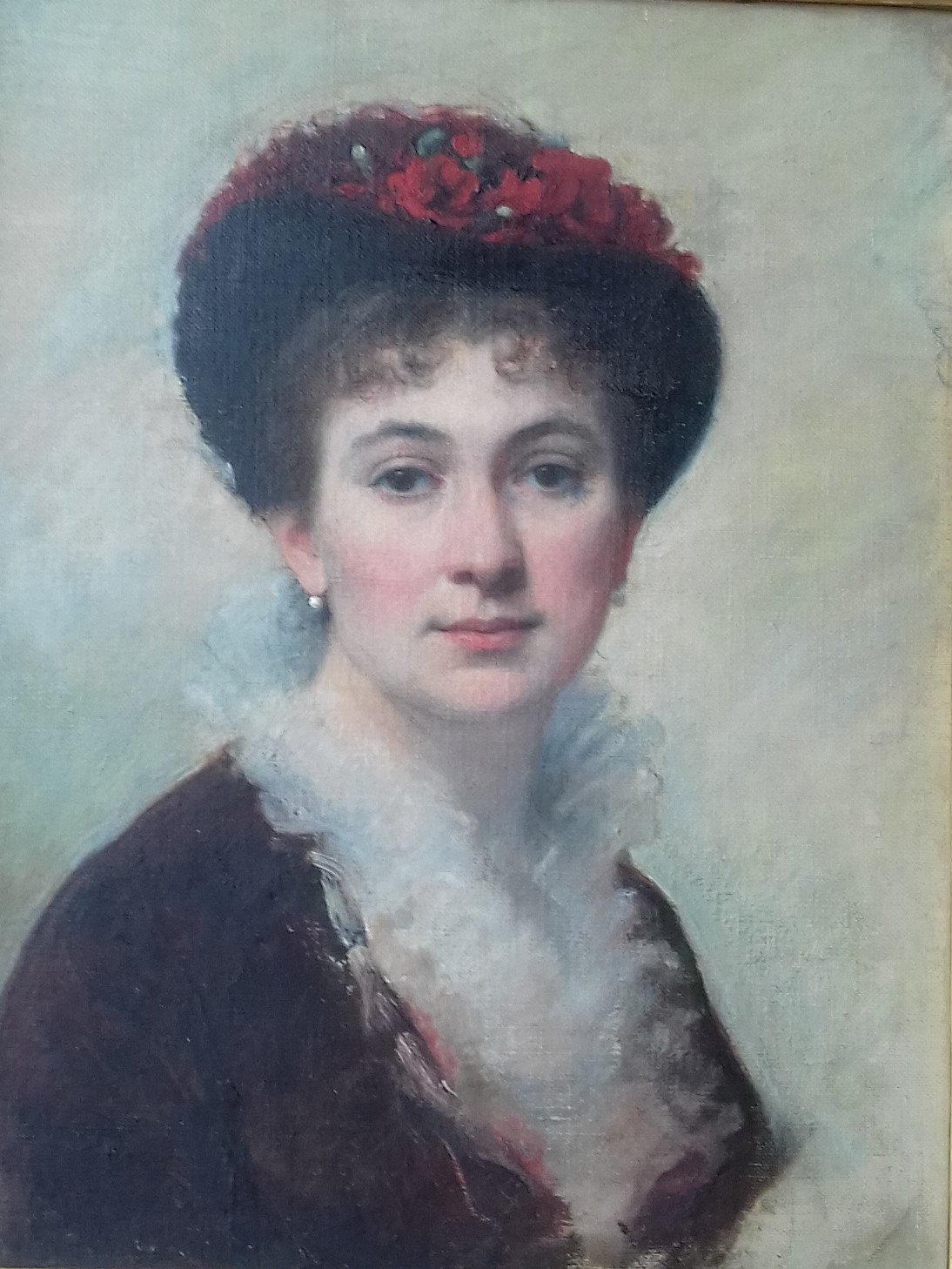
Self-portrait of Pauline Laurens

Pauline Laurens (27 May 1850 – 1 January 1941) was a French painter and printmaker. In 1873, at the age of 22, Laurens exhibited for the first time at the highly esteemed Salon de Paris. Her work was selected for display in ten subsequent Salons. Laurens was married to Gustave Besnard, a naval officer who served in the French Navy for 50 years and held the position of Navy Minister from 1895 to 1898. In 1875, art critic Eugène-Henri Le Brun-Dalbanne described her paintings as reminiscent of the work of Antoine Watteau and Jean-Baptiste Greuze.

== Biography ==
Born in Paris in 1850 into an upper middle-class family, Pauline Laurens grew up in an environment that regarded art and painting as essential components of a young girl's education. Because women were not yet allowed to attend the École Nationale des Beaux-Arts de Paris, Laurens studied painting with Charles Chaplin (1825–1891), a highly regarded teacher known for his refined portraits of young women. During the Belle Époque, Chaplin offered art classes exclusively for women at his studio at 23 rue de Lisbonne in Paris. Laurens’classmates included Mary Cassatt, Henriette Browne, Louise Abbéma, Madeleine Lemaire, and Eva Gonzalès. Laurens also studied engraving with Charles Albert Waltner (1846–1925), celebrated for his skill in translating large color oil paintings by Rembrandt, Thomas Gainsborough and Eugène Delacroix into etchings.

Laurens exhibited annually at the Paris Salon de peinture et de sculpture between 1873 and 1884. During the Belle Époque, the Paris Salon was the most prestigious venue in French artistic life. Having a painting or engraving accepted conferred considerable visibility and status. Unsurprisingly, the ratio of female artists accepted at the Salon remained significantly lower than that of men. From 1871 to 1885, women made up 10 to 15% of the exhibitors, while men made up 85 to 90%.

In the years 1875–1880, Pauline Laurens was a sought-after portrait painter among the high society of the Third Republic. During the same period, she also produced numerous etchings and received an award for her engravings at the 1877 Paris Salon.

Laurens made several trips to Italy in 1875, 1878, and 1880, where she studied and copied masterpieces in churches and palaces in Florence, Venice, Rome, the Vatican, and Naples.

In 1881, she married Gustave Besnard, then a Navy Captain. Besnard was later promoted to Vice Admiral in 1892 and served as Ministre de la Marine, the French equivalent of First Lord of the Admiralty, from 1895 to 1898. The couple had eight children: four daughters and four sons.

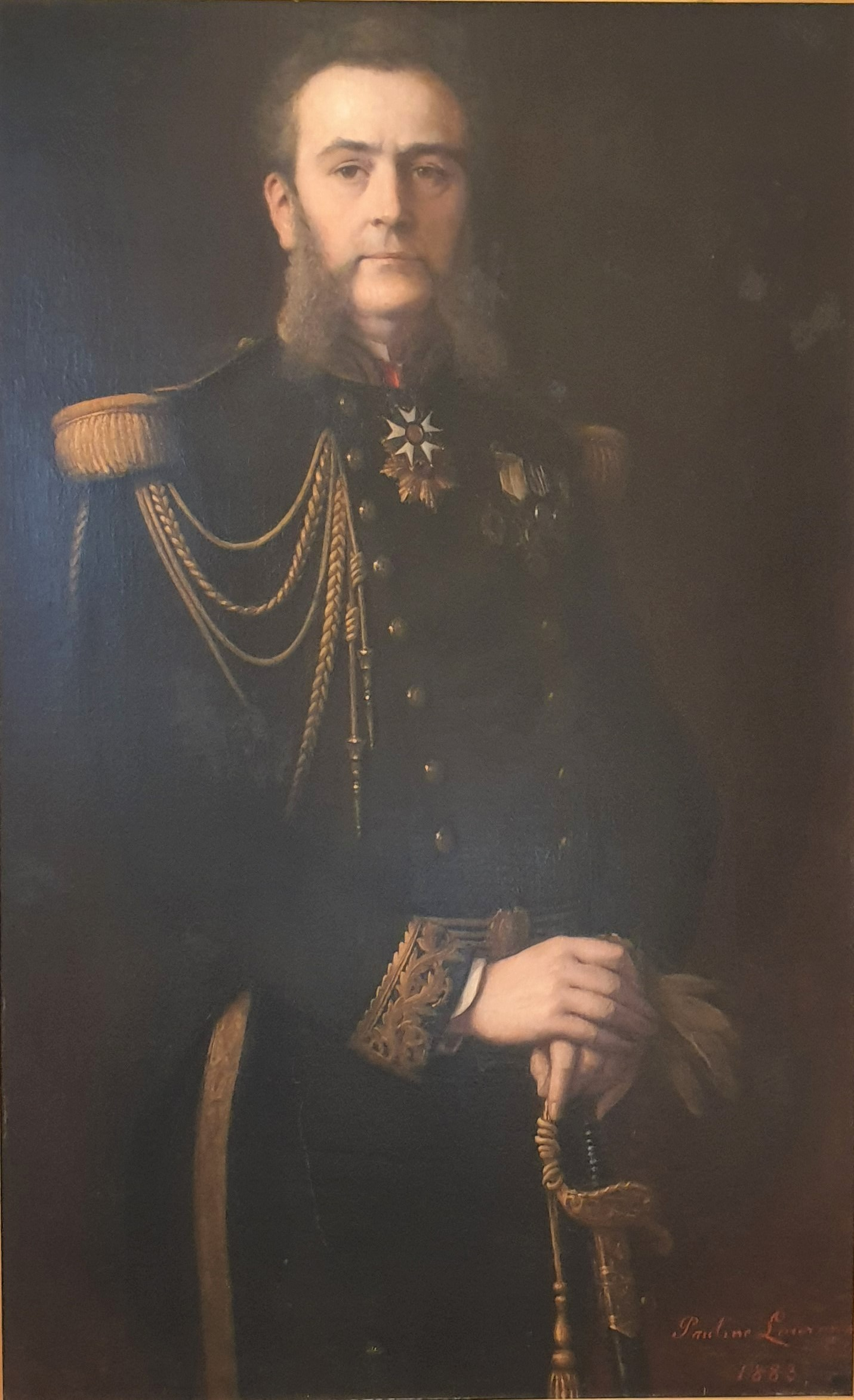
Portrait of Navy Captain Gustave Besnard (husband of Pauline Laurens)

After her marriage in 1881, Pauline Laurens -conforming to the social conventions of the time- ceased selling her paintings and etchings. During the Belle Époque, it was considered unacceptable for the wife of a naval officer to maintain a professional artistic career. Nevertheless, Laurens continued to paint, producing portraits of family members and close acquaintances.

Throughout the 1880s and 1890s, Pauline Laurens painted numerous portraits of her children, signing them with her maiden name as an expression of personal independence. These portraits demonstrate her remarkable skill in capturing the features and lively presence of young sitters - subjects known for their restlessness.

== Public collections ==
- Musée des Beaux-Arts de Troyes (Troyes Art Museum): Rosette and Dick (1875), oil on canvas, inventory number 875.6, Joconde database reference 000PE033148.
- British Museum: Portrait of Mr. Chaplin, after a painting by Gustave Ricard, etching, inventory number 1880,0214.1966.
- Philadelphia Museum of Art: Poverella!, after a painting by Pauline Laurens, etching, inventory number 1985-52-17906
- Petit Palais (musée des Beaux-Arts de la Ville de Paris): Woman Playing Guitar, after a painting by Charles Chaplin, etching, inventory number PPG15897.
- Petit Palais (musée des Beaux-Arts de la Ville de Paris): Young Girl Writing, after a painting by Charles Chaplin, etching, inventory number PPG15908.
- Petit Palais (musée des Beaux-Arts de la Ville de Paris) : Portrait of a Girl in a Medallion, after a painting by Charles Chaplin, etching, inventory number PPG1591(1).
- Petit Palais (musée des Beaux-Arts de la Ville de Paris): Portrait of Mademoiselle Alix de Bertier de Sauvigny (1857-1880), after a painting by Charles Chaplin, etching, inventory number PPG1591(2).
- Petit Palais (musée des Beaux-Arts de la Ville de Paris): Mother and Child, after a painting by Charles Chaplin, etching, inventory number PPG1592(1).
- Fine Arts Museums of San Francisco: Portrait of Mr. Chaplin, after a painting by Gustave Ricard, etching, inventory number 1963.30.22985.
- Musée Gassendi, Digne-les-Bains: Poverella!, after a painting by Pauline Laurens, etching.

== Private collections ==
=== Paintings ===
- Young Girl Distracted from Her Lesson (Une distraction), oil on canvas, exhibited at the 1873 Paris Salon under number 882.

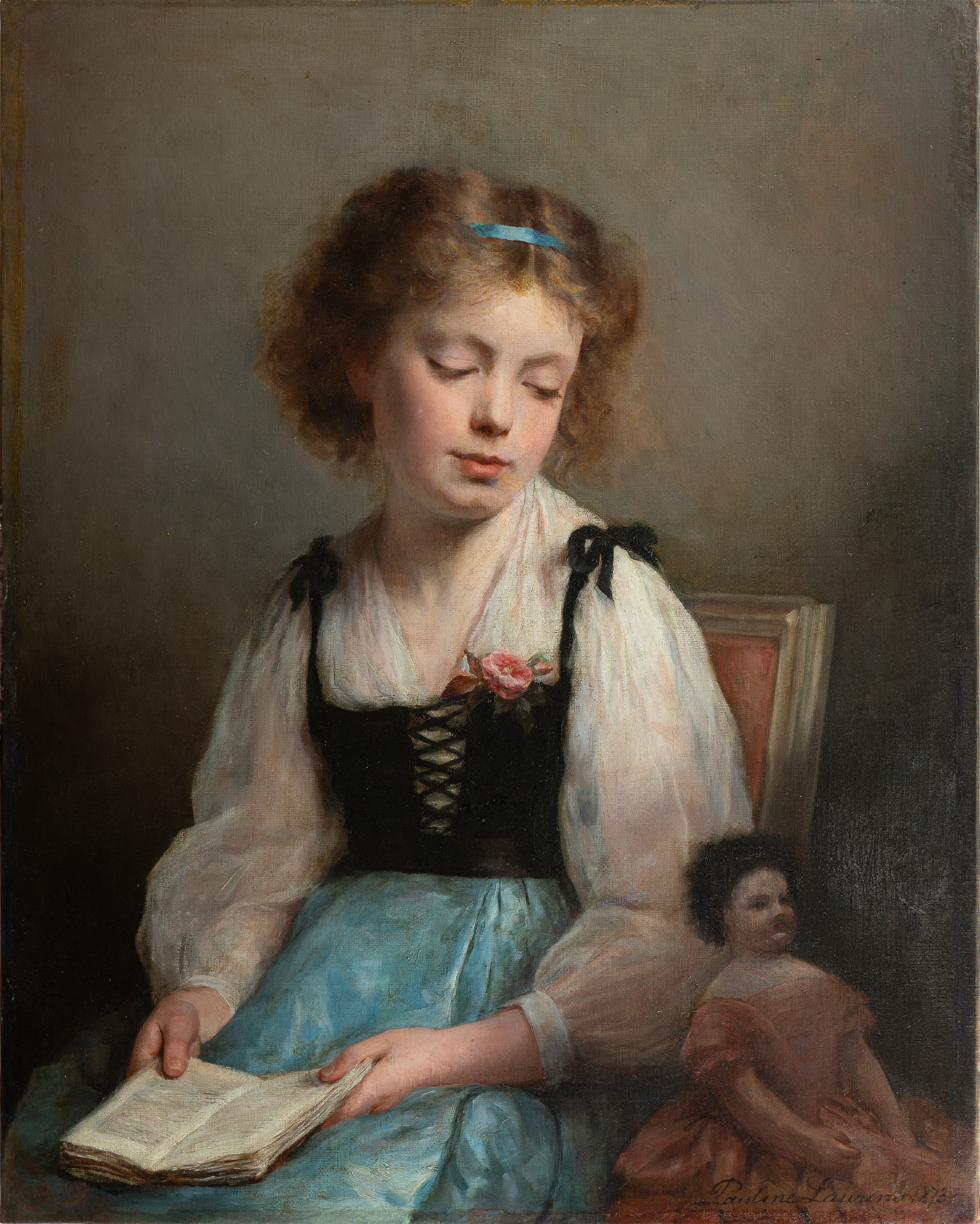
Une distraction

- Poverella!, oil on canvas, exhibited at the 1874 Paris Salon under number 1102.

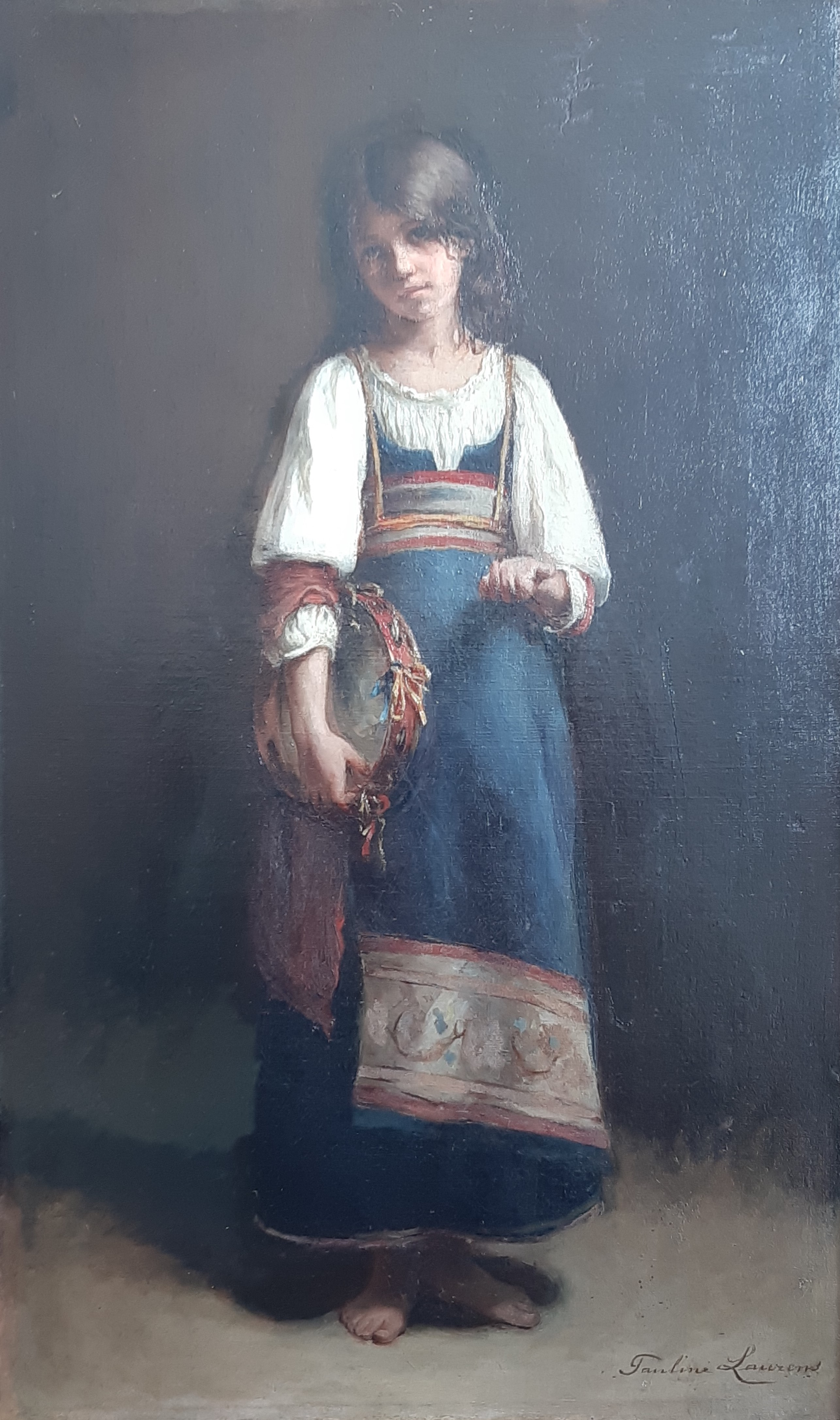
Poverella!

- Young Woman Playing Mandolin (1875), oil on canvas, exhibited at the 1875 Paris Salon under number 1257.
- Béatrix (1875), oil on canvas, exhibited at the 1875 Paris Salon under number 1258.
- Self-Portrait (1875), oil on canvas.
- Betsy, the Flower Girl (1876), oil on canvas, exhibited at the 1876 Paris Salon under number 1211.
- Madame L. (1877), oil on canvas, exhibited at the 1877 Paris Salon under number 1232.
- Child with Red Bow (1877), oil on canvas.

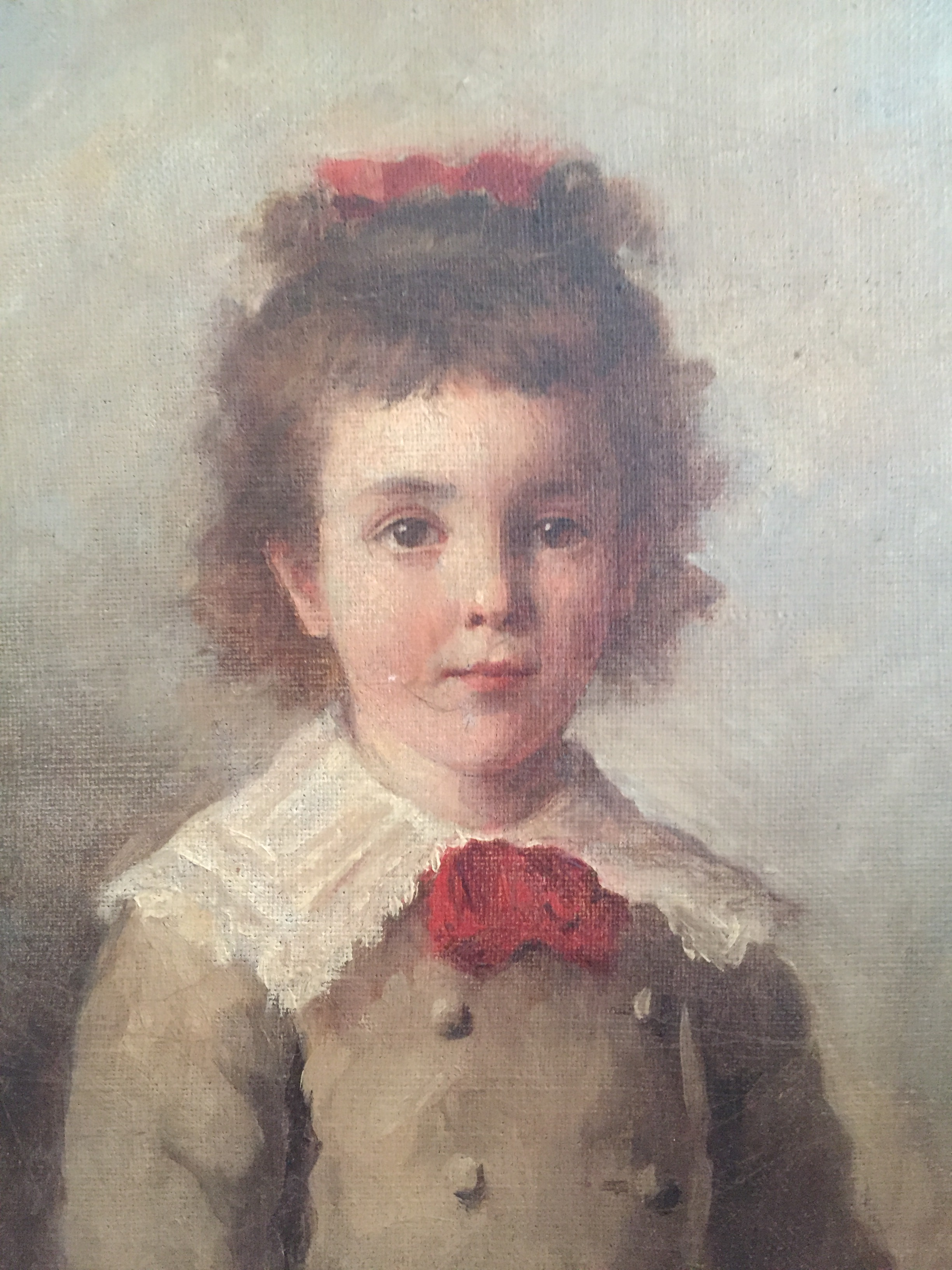
Child with Red Bow

- Mademoiselle M. B. (1878), oil on canvas, exhibited at the 1878 Paris Salon under number 1338.
- Une page attachante (1879), oil on canvas, exhibited at the 1879 Paris Salon under number 1795.
- Rêverie (1879), oil on canvas, exhibited at the 1879 Paris Salon under number 1796.
- Müngyn (1880), oil on canvas, exhibited at the 1880 Paris Salon under number 2156.
- Mademoiselle Marguerite B. (1880), oil on canvas, exhibited at the 1880 Paris Salon under number 2157.
- Woman Reading a Letter (circa 1880), oil on canvas.
- Madame Boullaire, Sister of the Artist (1881), oil on canvas, exhibited at the 1881 Paris Salon under number 1347.
- Étienne-Barthélemy Bagnoud, Bishop of Bethlehem (Portrait de Monseigneur Bagnoud, évêque de Bethléem), oil on canvas, exhibited at the 1881 Paris Salon under number 1348.

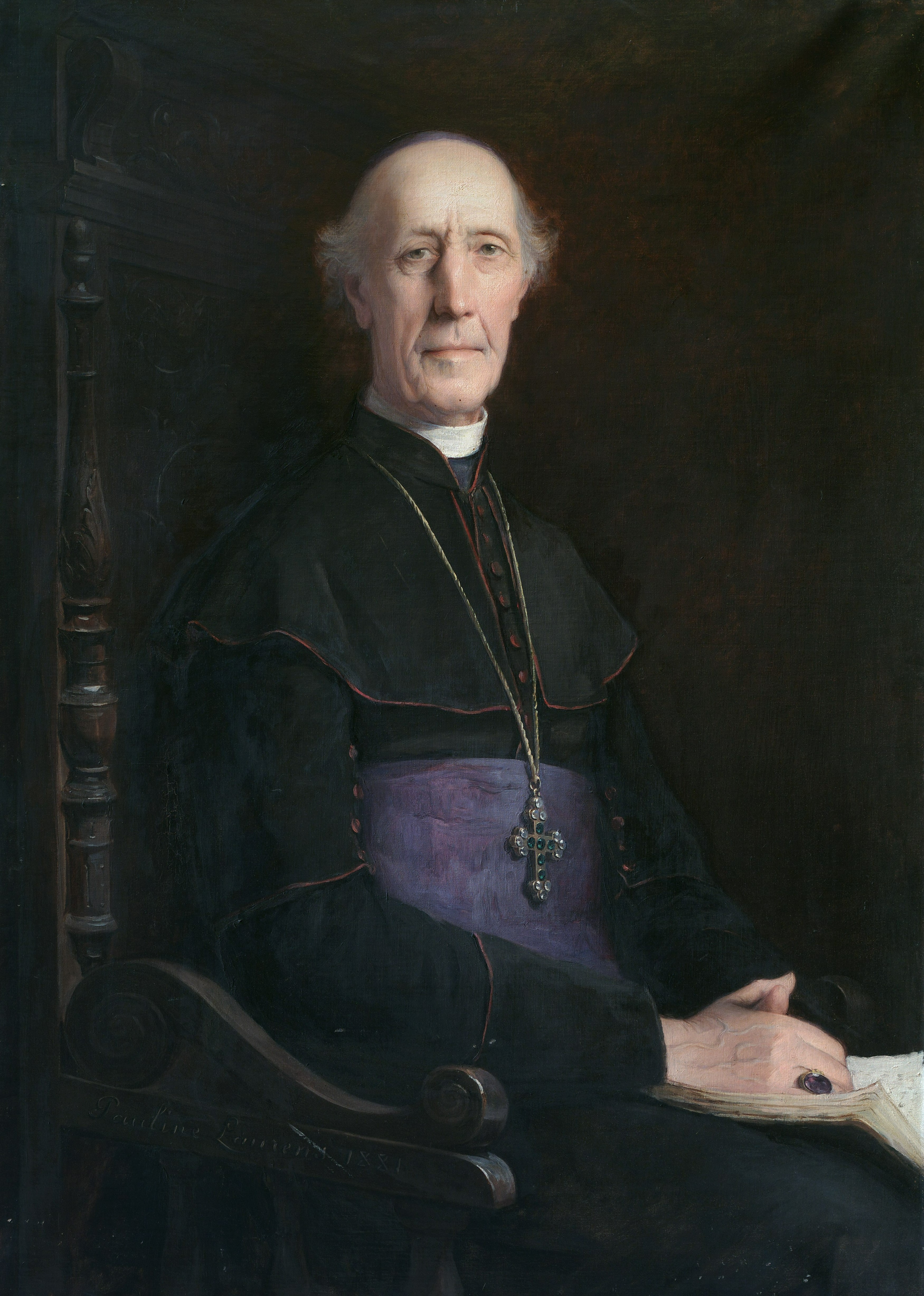
Étienne-Barthélemy Bagnoud, Bishop of Bethlehem

- Mademoiselle Jeanne T. (1882), oil on canvas, exhibited at the 1882 Paris Salon under number 1563.
- Portrait of Navy Captain Gustave Besnard (1883), oil on canvas, exhibited at the 1884 Paris Salon under number 1426.
- Jean Besnard, the Artist's Son (1890), oil on canvas.
- Yvonne Besnard, the Artist's Daughter (1890), oil on canvas.
- Jeanne Besnard, the Artist's Daughter (1891), oil on canvas.
- Jacques Besnard, the Artist's Son (1891), oil on canvas.
- Hélène Besnard, the Artist's Daughter (1891), oil on canvas.

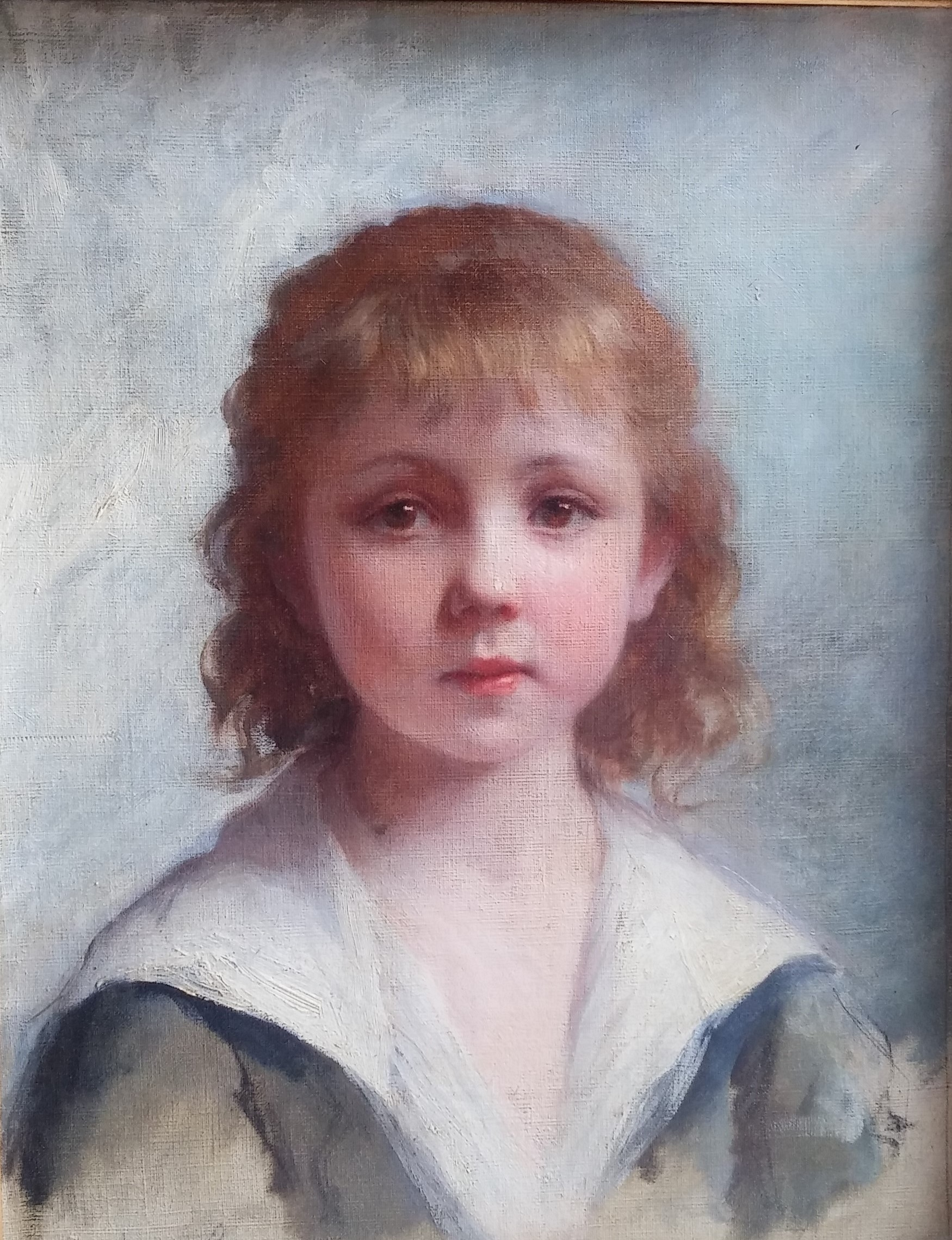
Hélène Besnard, the Artist's Daughter

=== Etchings ===
Source:.

- Young Girl, after a painting by Charles Chaplin, etching exhibited at the 1875 Paris Salon under number 3726.
- Colombine, after a painting by Madeleine Lemaire, etching exhibited at the 1875 Paris Salon under number 3726.
- An Old Woman, after L. Hugo, etching, circa 1875.
- Poverella!, after a painting by Pauline Laurens, etching exhibited at the 1875 Paris Salon under number 3726.
- Woman Playing Guitar, after a painting by Charles Chaplin, etching exhibited at the 1876 Paris Salon under number 3893.
- Madame Boullaire, Sister of the Artist, after a painting by Amaury-Duval, etching exhibited at the 1876 Paris Salon under number 3894.
- The Study, after a painting by Charles Chaplin, etching exhibited at the 1877 Paris Salon under number 4454.
- A School in Cairo, after a painting by Henriette Browne, etching exhibited at the 1877 Paris Salon under number 4455.
- Mademoiselle de B., after a painting by Charles Chaplin, etching exhibited at the 1878 Paris Salon under number 4854.
- Mademoiselle de G., after a painting by Charles Chaplin, etching exhibited at the 1878 Paris Salon under number 4855.
- Portrait of Mr. Chaplin, after a painting by Gustave Ricard, etching exhibited at the 1879 Paris Salon under number 5712.
- Madame la Vicomtesse de C., after a painting by Charles Chaplin, etching exhibited at the 1880 Paris Salon under number 7058.

=== Reception ===
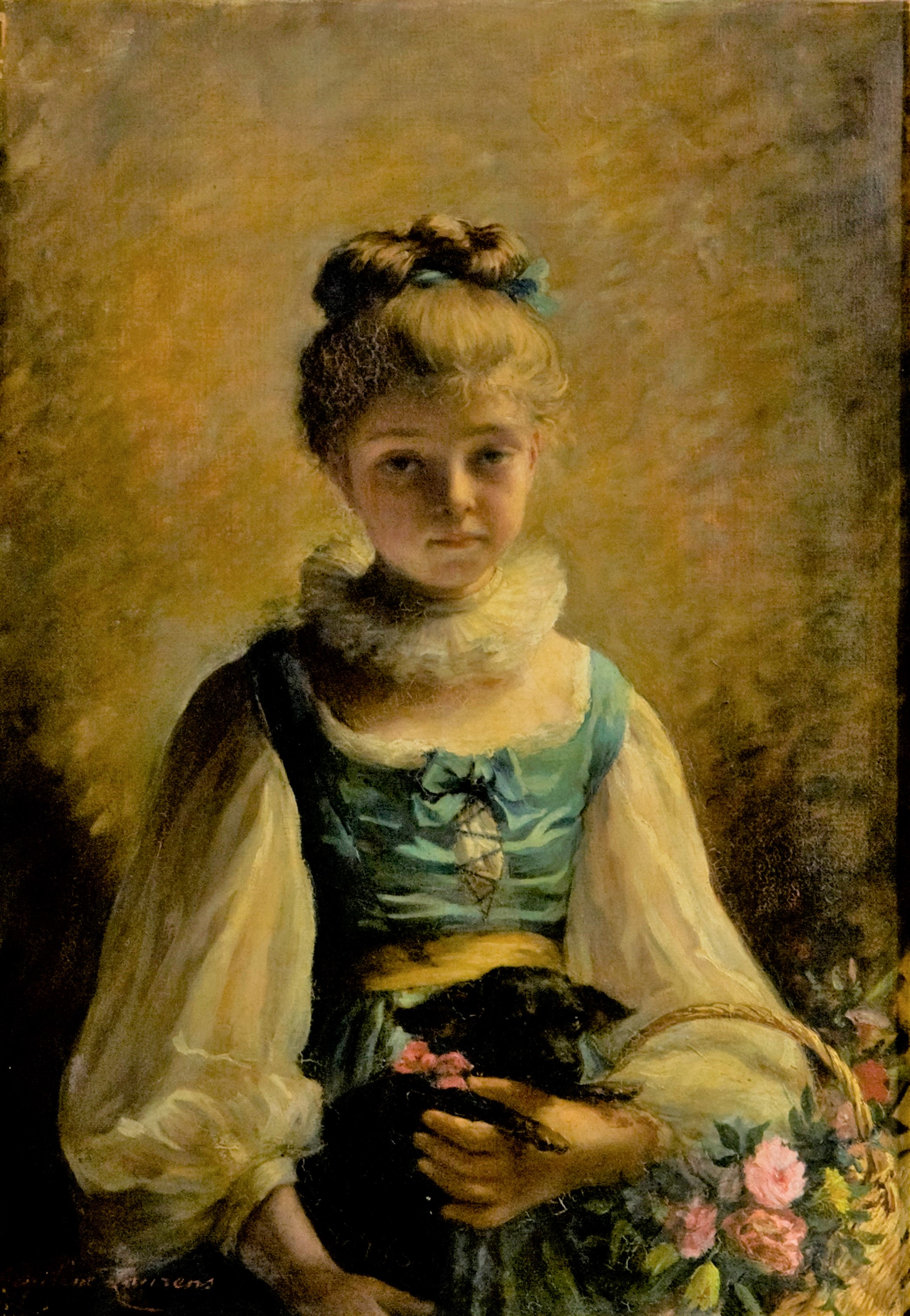
Rosette and Dick

Rosette and Dick In 1875, Eugène-Henri Le Brun-Dalbanne, curator of the Musée de Peinture de Troyes from 1871 to 1880, analyzed and praised Rosette and Dick: “To remind us of Watteau, to awaken memories of Greuze, to recall Chaplin, and yet remain oneself, is no small talent. Mademoiselle Pauline Laurens shows the best of her gifts in her charming painting entitled: Rosette and Dick. [...] Mademoiselle Pauline Laurens, who draws and paints with great skill, no longer counts her successes. Admitted to every Salon in which she has presented her works, she is destined to join the elite group of sensitive, intelligent, gifted women artists who prove that for them, art is no vain amusement.”

Child Portrait at the 1878 Salon In Les femmes artistes au Salon de 1878 et à l'Exposition universelle, Anatole Alès (writing under the pseudonym Jean Alesson) commented on the Portrait of Mademoiselle M. B. shown at the 1878 Paris Salon: “Among the most recent child portraits, we would like to mention Pauline Laurens's portrait of a young girl in gray velvet with a pomegranate-red bow. The child, holding a hoop, remains motionless only out of obedience. Life has not left her. It is a beautiful painting, very distinguished” (page 14).

Une page attachante and Rêverie

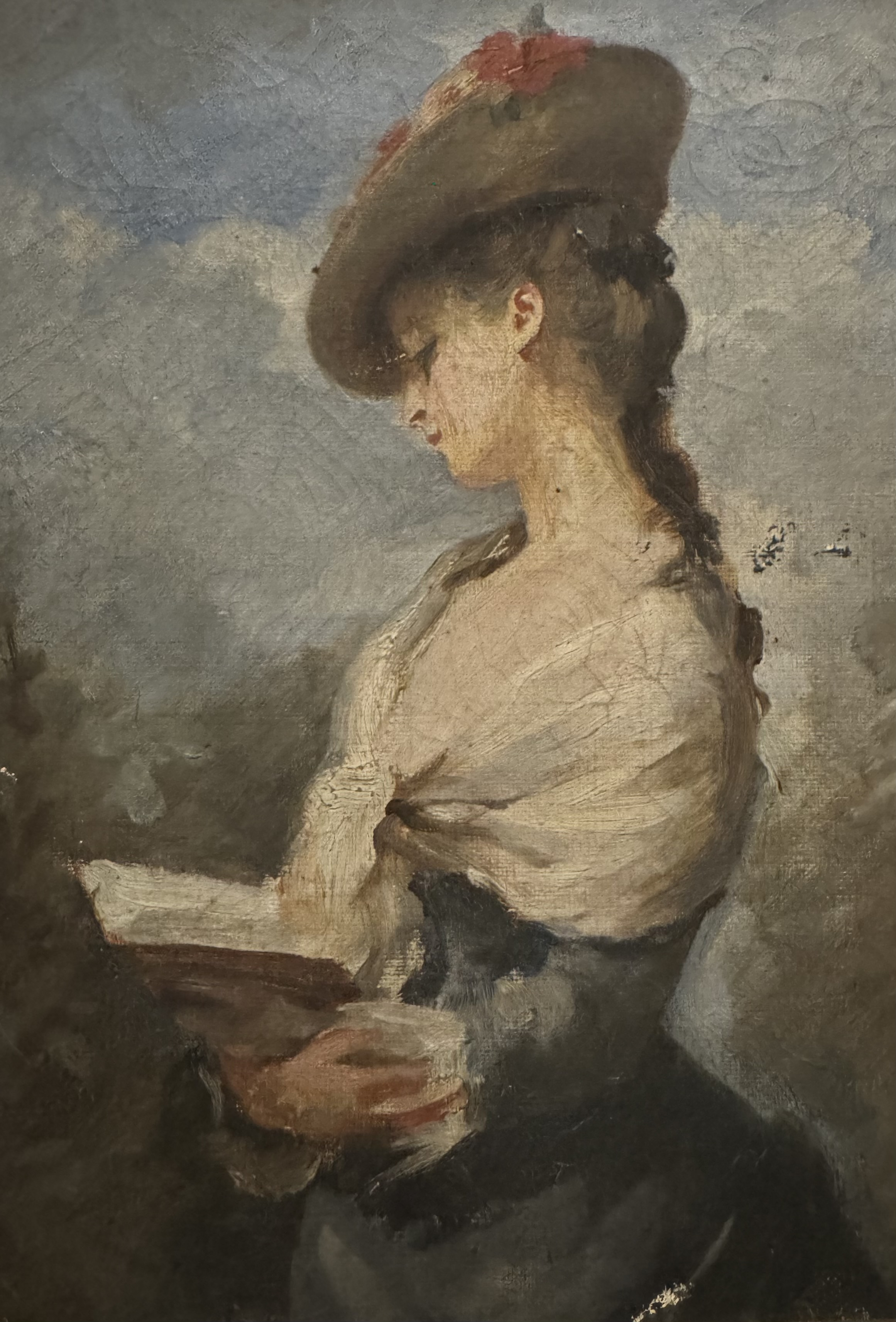
Study for "Une page attachante"

In his Dictionnaire Véron, Théodore Véron wrote about Une page attachante, exhibited at the 1879 Paris Salon : “This charming young châtelaine lowers her pretty head, wearing a straw hat adorned with poppies. She reads with an air of modesty. It is as graceful and poetic as a painting by Chaplin”. Regarding Rêverie, shown at the same Salon, he added: “La Rêverie is a very lovely figure, and she truly dreams. Oh, how beautiful she is! It is poetic and artistic, mademoiselle! In truth, you successfully compete with Madame Browne and Monsieur Chaplin! With a little effort, great rewards await you. You are a poet, mademoiselle!”.
