= The Houses of Parliament from Millbank =

Painting by David Roberts

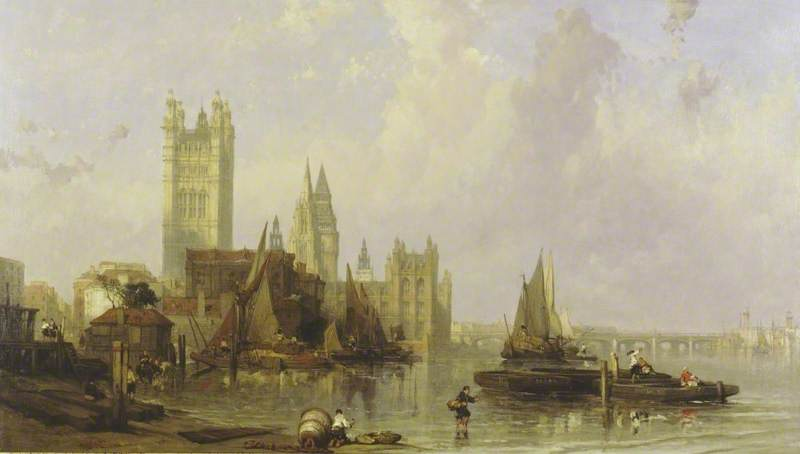
- Artist: David Roberts
- Year: 1861
- Type: Oil on canvas, landscape painting
- Dimensions: 61 cm × 106 cm (24 in × 42 in)
- Location: Museum of London, London

The Houses of Parliament from Millbank is an 1861 oil painting by the British artist David Roberts. A cityscape, the picture shows a view of Westminster from nearby Millbank. It features the Houses of Parliament, rebuilt to the design of Charles Barry following the major fire of 1834 as well as the distant Westminster Bridge. It captured the view just before the construction of the Thames Embankment radically altered the landscape.

The Scottish-born Roberts was based in London, by but became best known for his depictions of Spain, Italy and the Middle East. However earlier in his career he had produced a number of views of London. The concept of painting a new series of views of the capital said to have been suggested to Roberts by Turner before his death. This was the first of four paintings showing the Thames from various angles commissioned by the art collector John Lucas at 200 guineas each, which Roberts completed before his death in 1864.

The picture was displayed at the Royal Academy Exhibition of 1862 held at the National Gallery in London and was reviewed by The Art Journal and The Times. The painting was auctioned by Christie's in 2002 for just over £100,000. It was acquired by the Museum of London, with assistance from the Art Fund.

== Bibliography ==
- Chilvers, Ian (ed.) The Oxford Dictionary of Art and Artists. Oxford University Press, 2009.
- Sim, Katherine. David Roberts R.A., 1796–1864: A Biography. Quartet Books, 1984.
