= Roast Pig (painting) =

Painting by Thomas Webster

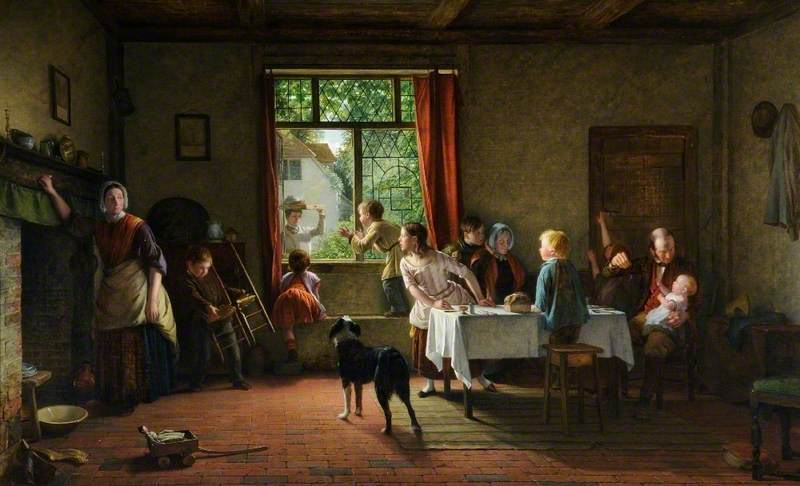
- Artist: Thomas Webster
- Year: 1862
- Type: Oil on canvas, genre painting
- Dimensions: 73.2 cm × 118.6 cm (28.8 in × 46.7 in)
- Location: Graves Art Gallery, Sheffield

Roast Pig is an 1862 oil painting by the British artist Thomas Webster. A genre painting it shows a scene in a cottage in rural England where a family expectantly wait for a meal of roast pig which is just about to be delivered through the open window. Webster was a member of the Royal Academy who enjoyed success with his scenes of everyday life during the Victorian era. By the time he produced this work he was associated with the Cranbrook Colony of artists in Kent.

The picture was displayed at the Royal Academy Exhibition of 1862 held at the National Gallery in London. It was acquired for £735 by the pen manufacturer and noted art collector Joseph Gillott the same year. Today the painting is in the collection of the Graves Art Gallery in Sheffield, having been gifted by Wilson Mappin in 1925.

== Bibliography ==
- Cowling, Mary. Victorian Figurative Painting: Domestic Life and the Contemporary Social Scene. Andreas Papadakis, 2000.
- Day, Ivan (ed.) Eat, Drink & be Merry: The British at Table, 1600-2000. P. Wilson, 2000.
- Reitlinger, Gerald. The Rise and Fall of the Picture Market, 1760-1960. Holt, Rinehart and Winston, 1964.
- Thompson, Carol (ed.) The Cranbrook Colony: Fresh Perspectives. Wolverhampton Art Gallery, 2010.
