= The Bay of Tangier (painting) =

Painting by Edward William Cooke

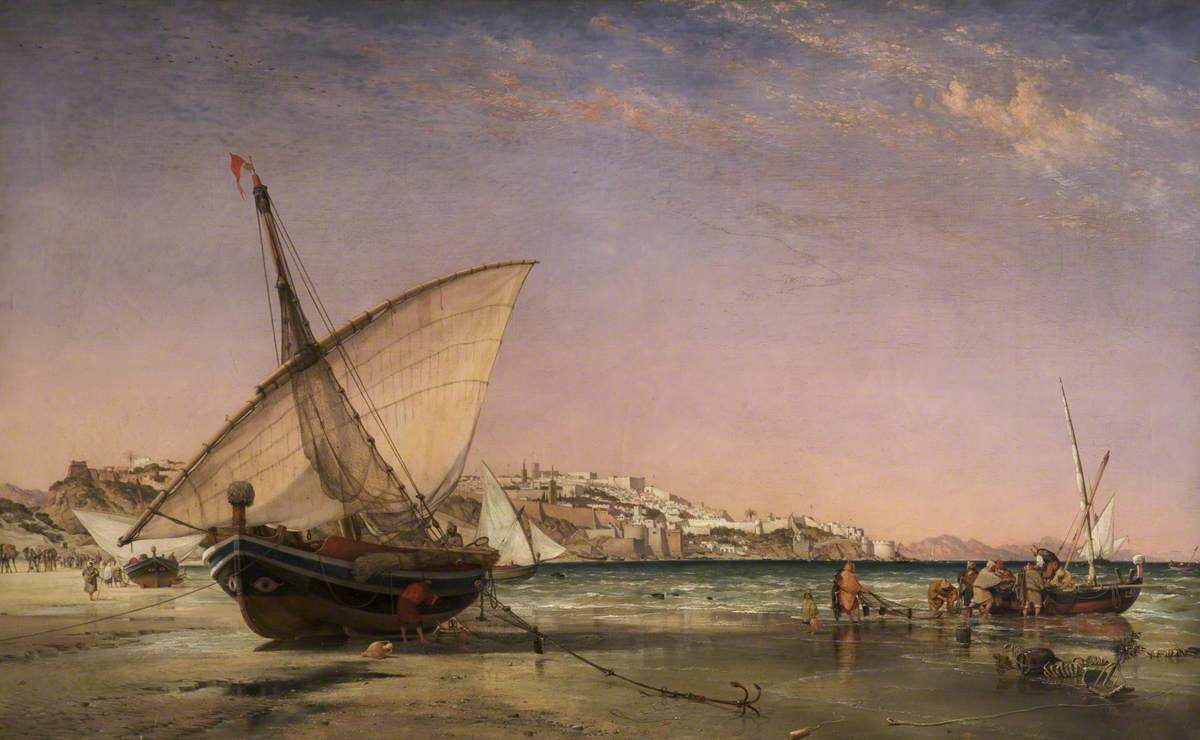
- Artist: Edward William Cooke
- Year: 1862
- Type: Oil on canvas, landscape painting
- Dimensions: 102 cm × 168 cm (40 in × 66 in)
- Location: Salford Museum and Art Gallery, Greater Manchester

The Bay of Tangier is an oil painting on canvas by the British artist Edward William Cooke, from 1862. It depicts Bay of Tangier on the Mediterranean coast of Morocco. The mountains of Southern Spain and Gibraltar can be see in the distance.

Inspired by the travels of David Roberts and other earlier artistic visitors to Spain, Cooke journeyed to the Iberian Peninsula in 1860 and the following year visited Tangier. The painting was displayed at the Royal Academy Exhibition of 1862 held at the National Gallery in London. He sold the work for 210 guineas. Today it belongs to Salford Museum and Art Gallery which acquired it in 1904

== Bibliography ==
- Howgego, James L. Edward William Cooke: An Exhibition of Paintings, Drawings and Relics. The Gallery, 1970.
- Munday, John. Edward William Cooke: A Man of His Time. Antique Collectors' Club, 1996.
