= Royal Academy Exhibition of 1862 =

1862 art exhibition in London

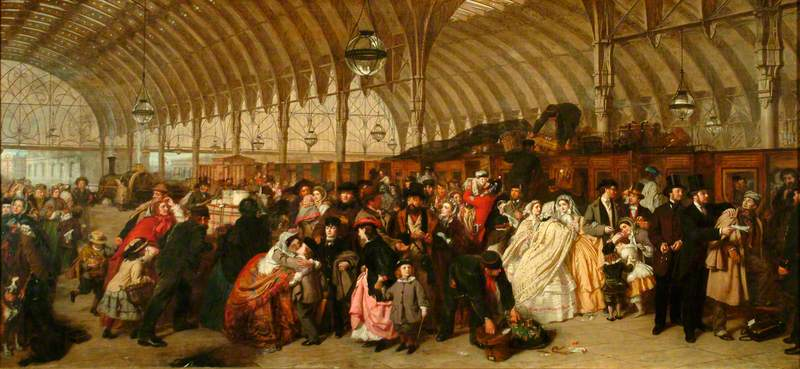
William Powell Frith chose not to display his popular The Railway Station at the Royal Academy, instead exhibiting it elsewhere

The Royal Academy Exhibition of 1862 was the ninety fourth annual Summer Exhibition of the British Royal Academy of Arts. It was held at the National Gallery in London between 5 May and 26 July 1862. William Powell Frith who has enjoyed great success with his 1858 work The Derby Day chose to exhibit his major new painting The Railway Station elsewhere in a blow to the Academy. He did however submit a portrait of the fellow painter Thomas Creswick. Attention was also drawn away to the 1862 International Exhibition held in South Kensington, follow-up to the Great Exhibition of 1851.

The veteran painter of seascapes Clarkson Stanfield submitted a view of Stack Rock in Antrim while his son George displayed a landscape of Limburg. Henry Wallis who had produced an iconic painting The Death of Chatterton several years before now showed The Death of Christopher Marlowe. Thomas Jones Barker displayed The Dawn of Victory, a scene from the Indian Mutiny.

Several works made reference to the 1860 Anglo-French expedition to China including Francis Grant's portraits of the diplomat Lord Elgin and his own brother general Sir Hope Grant. John Watson Gordon produced a portrait of the Prince of Wales for Oxford University.

== Gallery ==
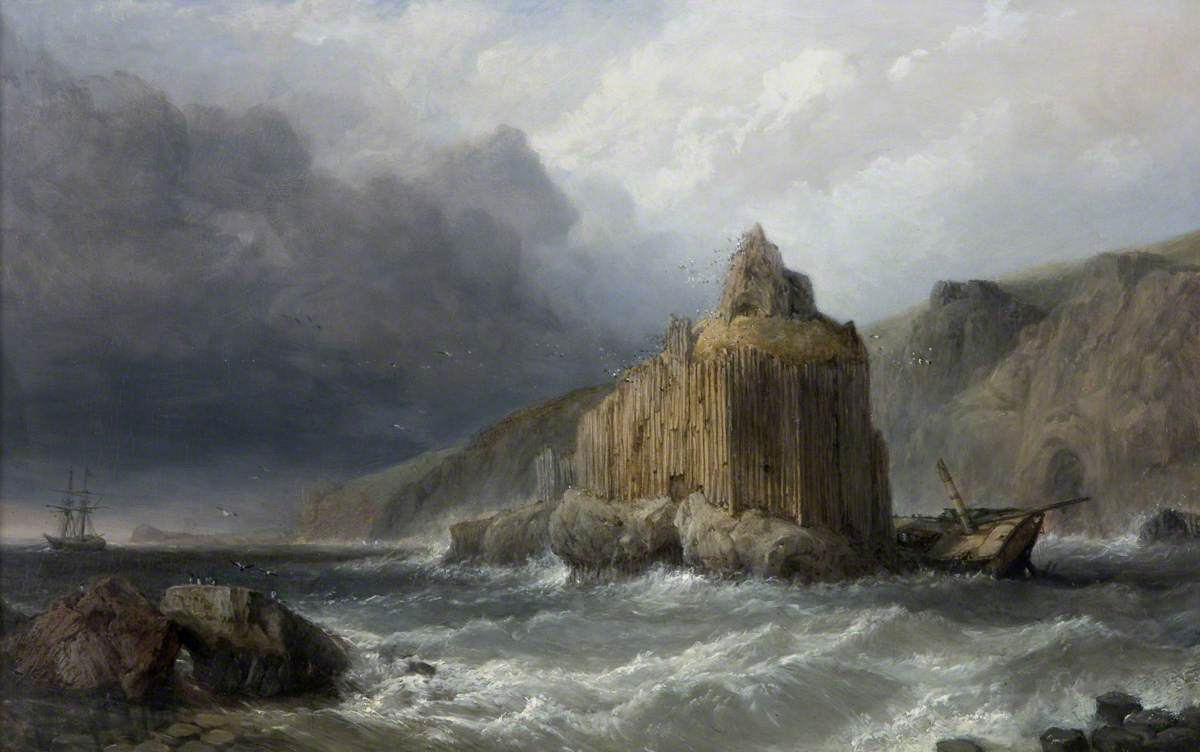
Stack Rock, County Antrim by Clarkson Stanfield

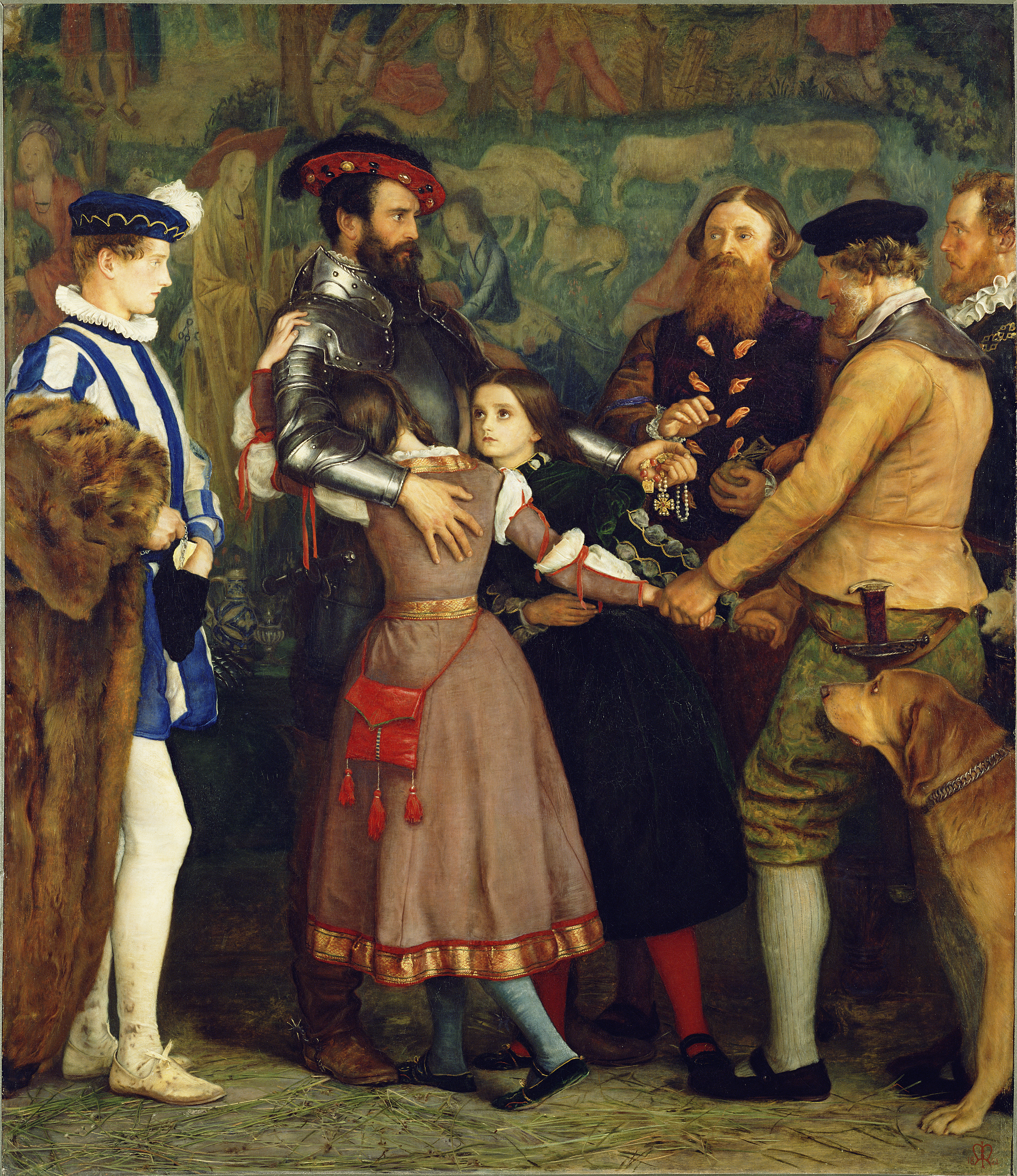
The Ransom by John Everett Millais

Trust Me by John Everett Millais

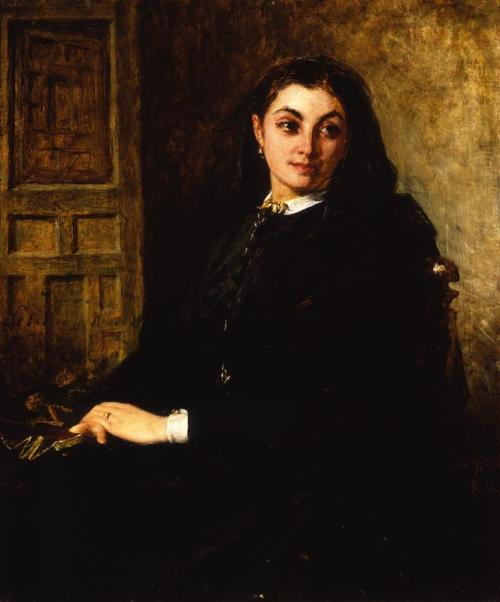
Dolores by John Phillip

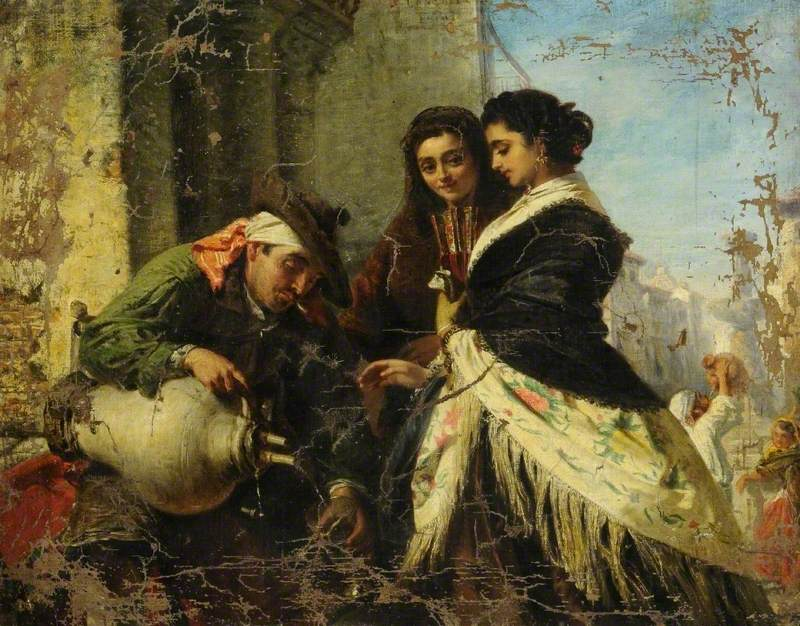
The Water Drinkers by John Phillip

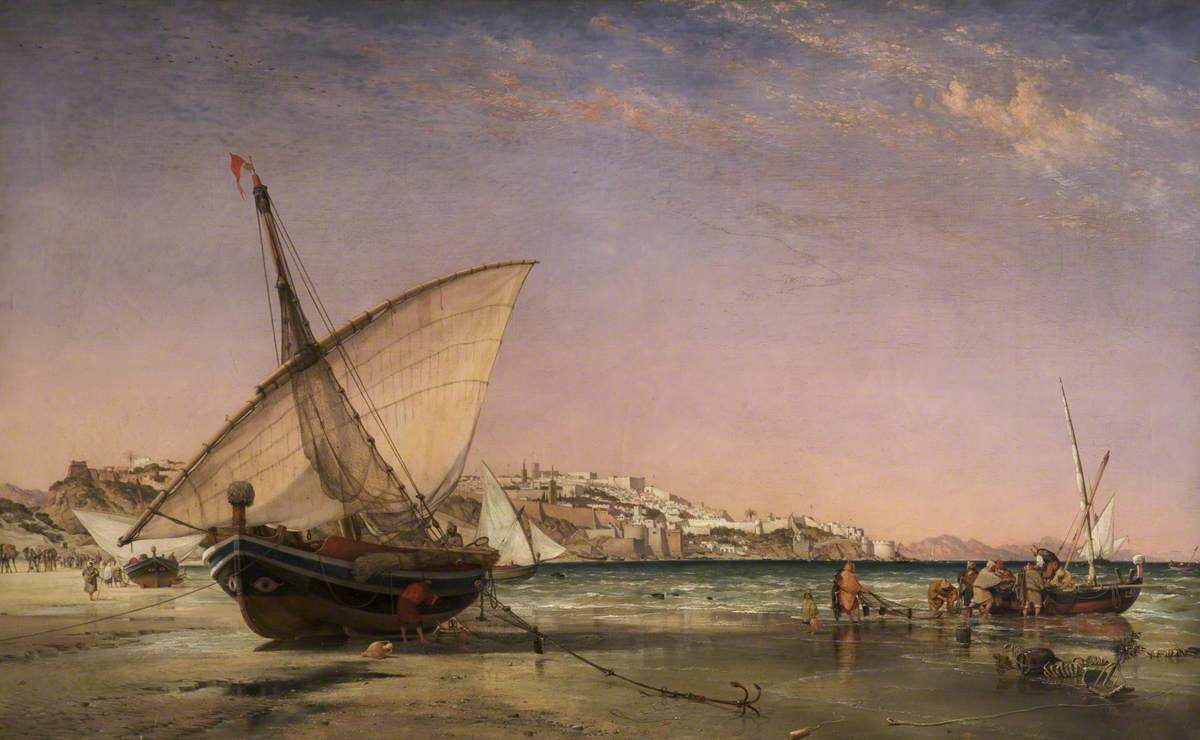
The Bay of Tangier by Edward William Cooke

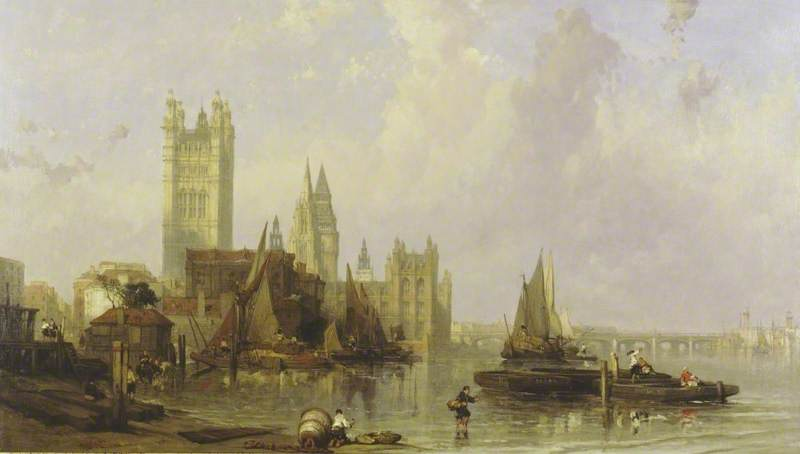
The Houses of Parliament from Millbank by David Roberts

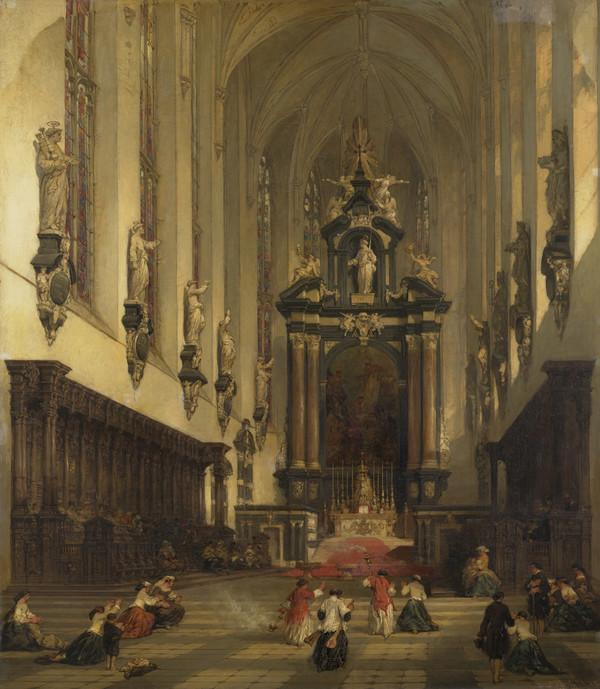
Chancel of St Paul's Antwerp by David Roberts

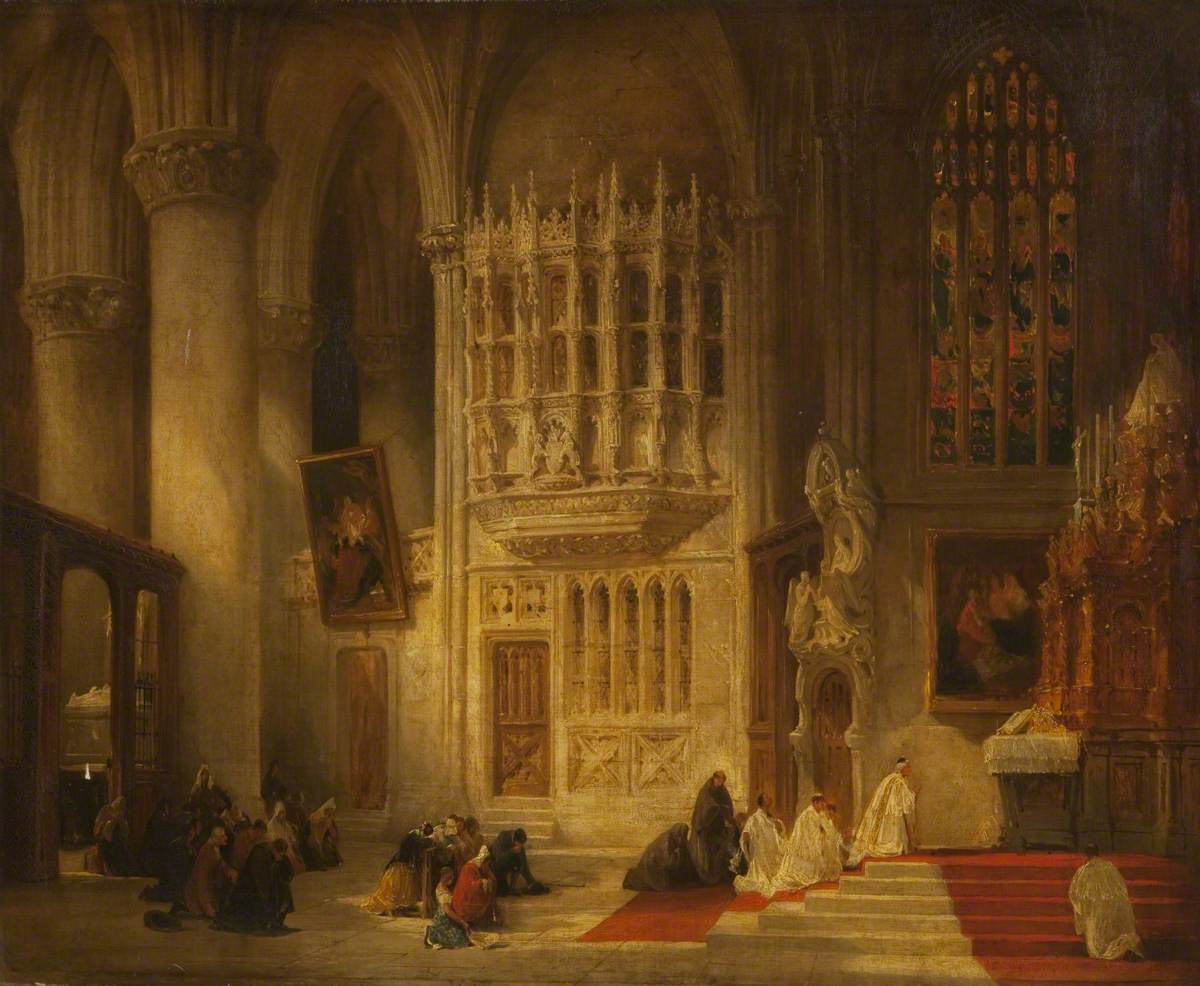
Church of Our Lady, Bruges by David Roberts

View from Waterloo Bridge by David Roberts

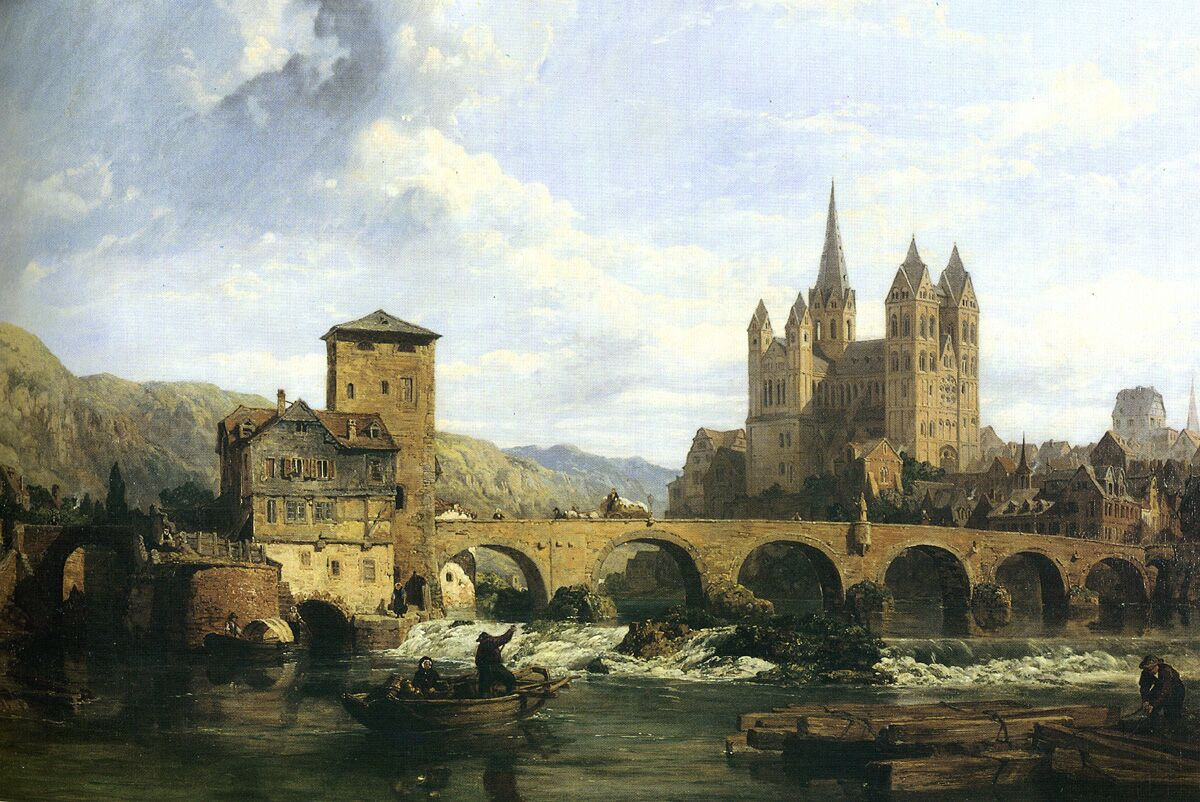
Limburg by George Clarkson Stanfield

Mary Stuart's Farewell to France by Henry Nelson O'Neil

Sisters by Frederic Leighton

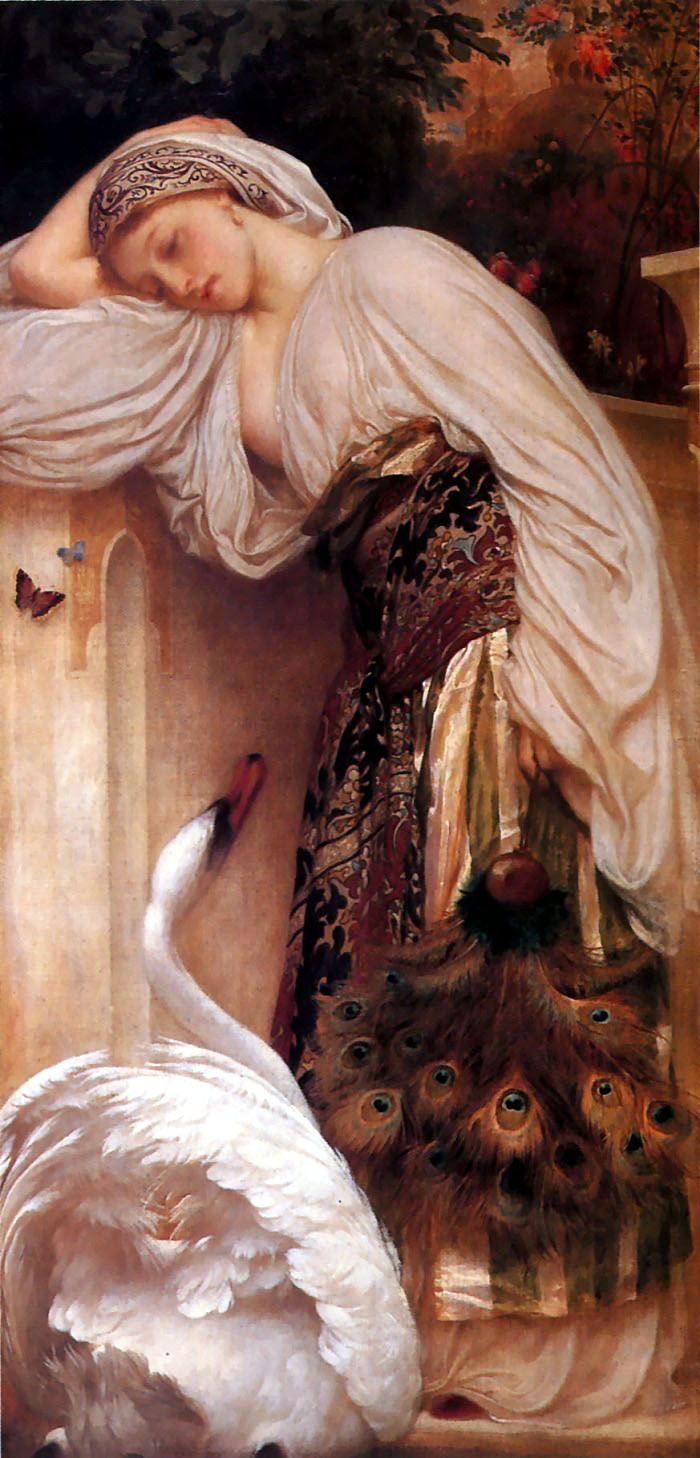
Odalisque by Frederic Leighton

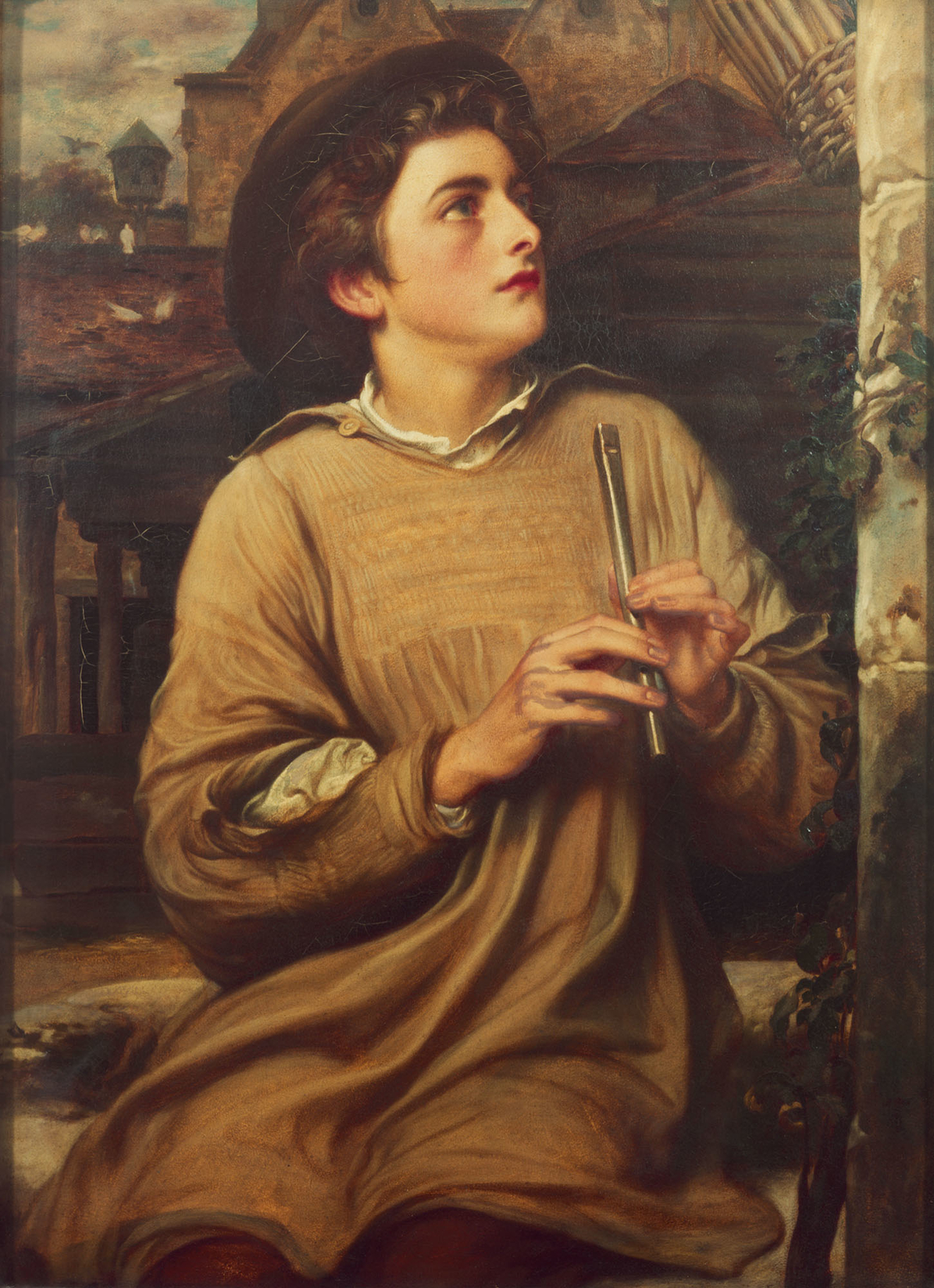
Duett by Frederic Leighton

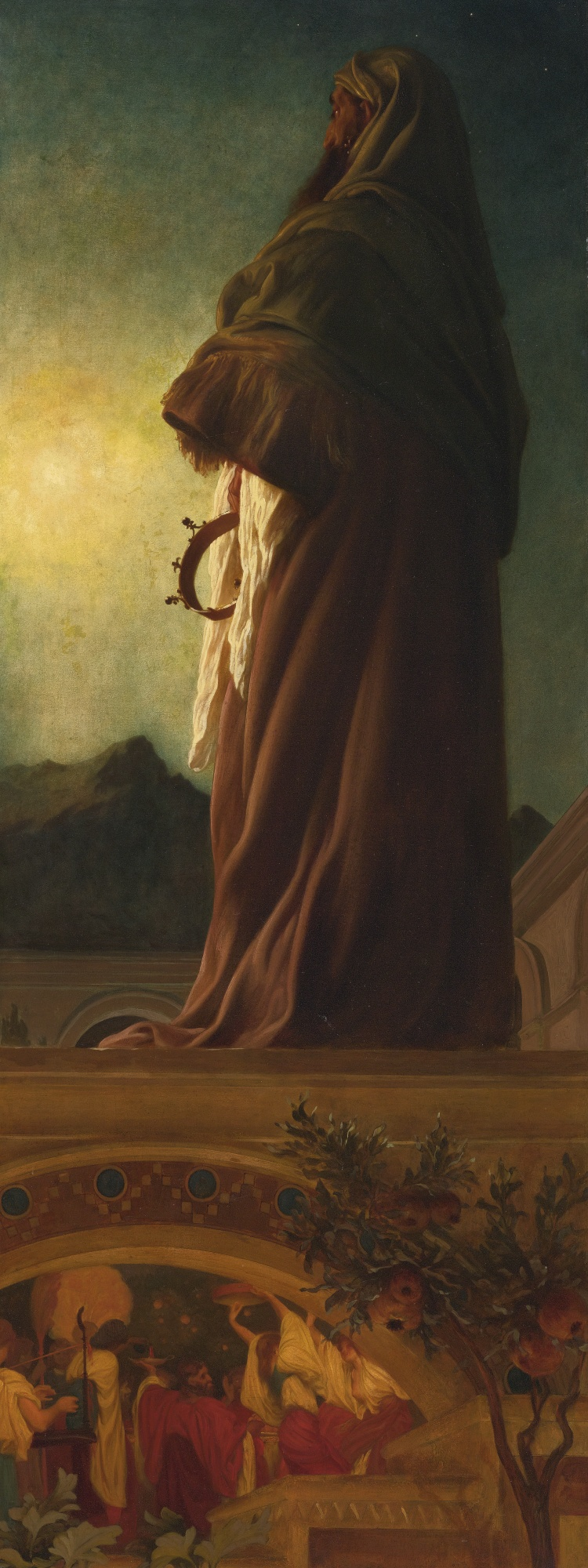
The Star of Bethlehem by Frederic Leighton

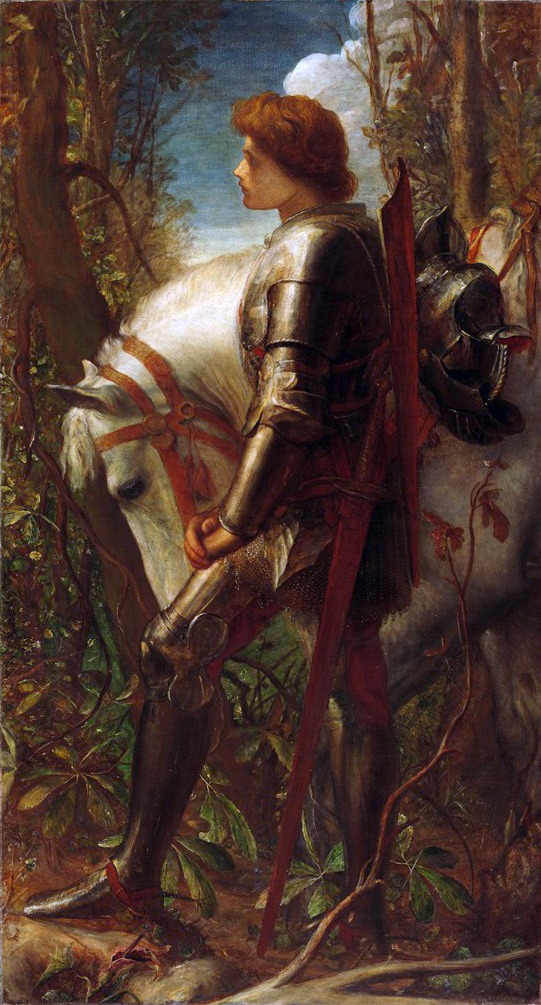
Sir Galahad by George Frederick Watts

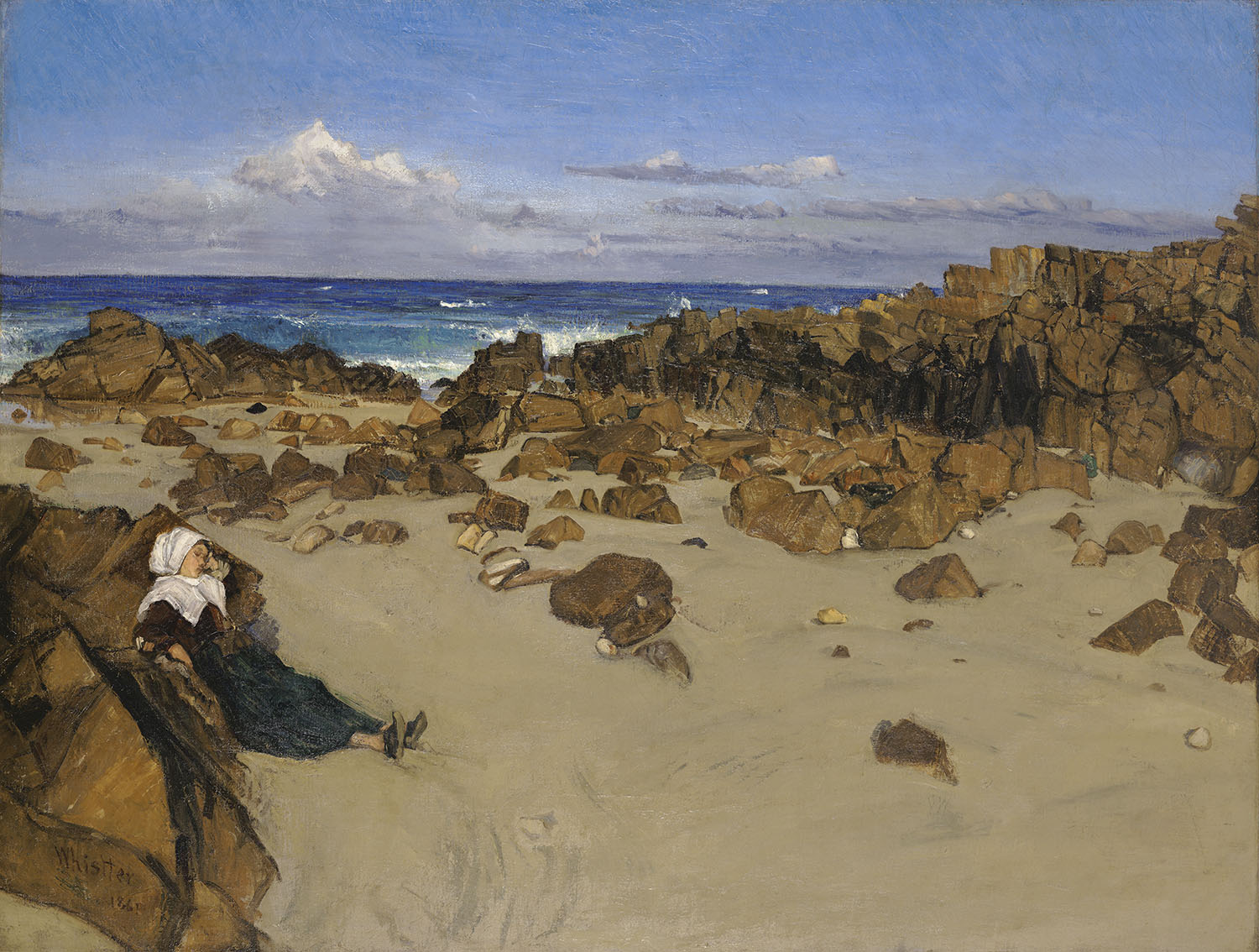
The Coast of Brittany by James McNeill Whistler

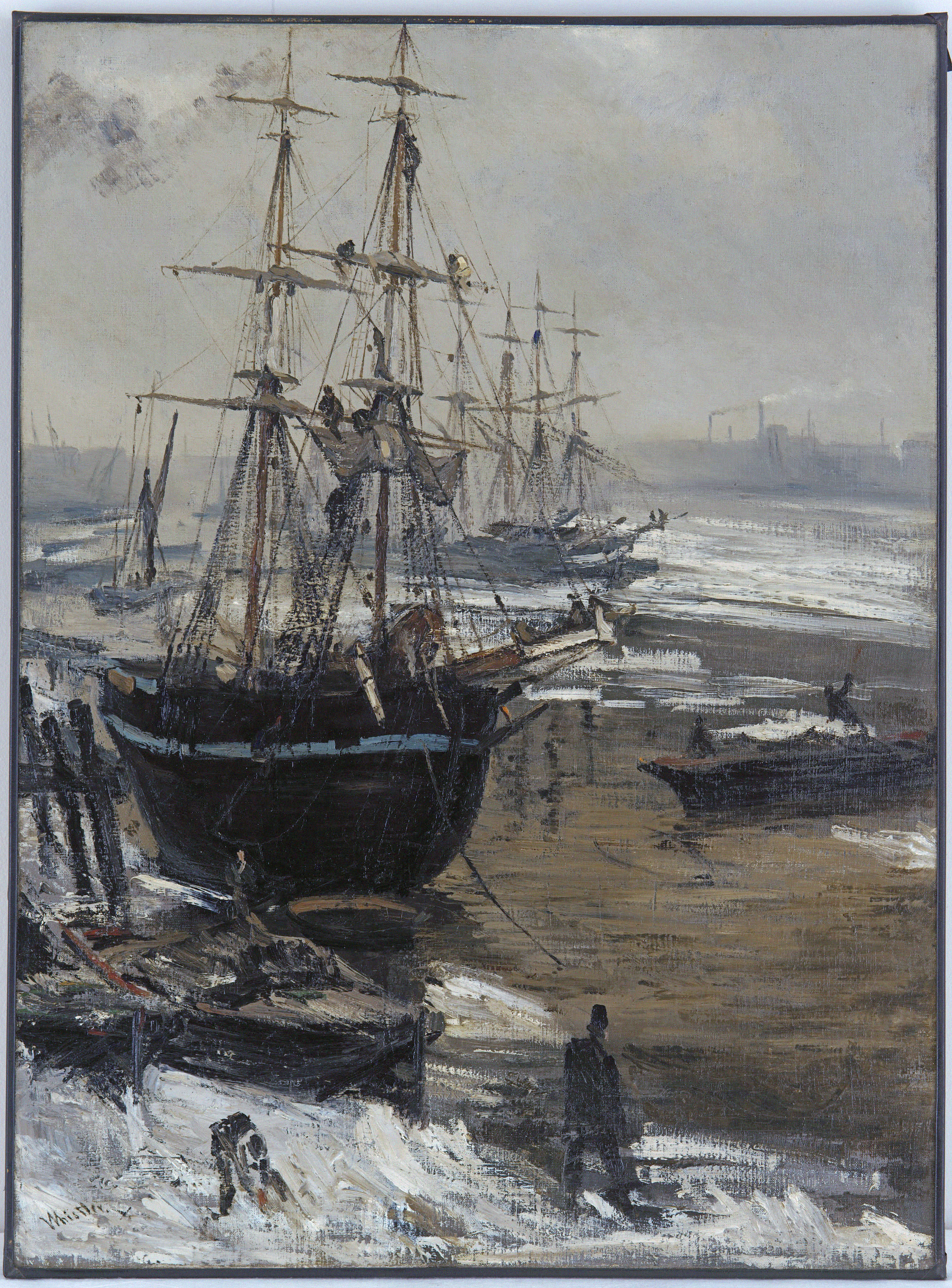
The Thames in Ice by James McNeill Whistler

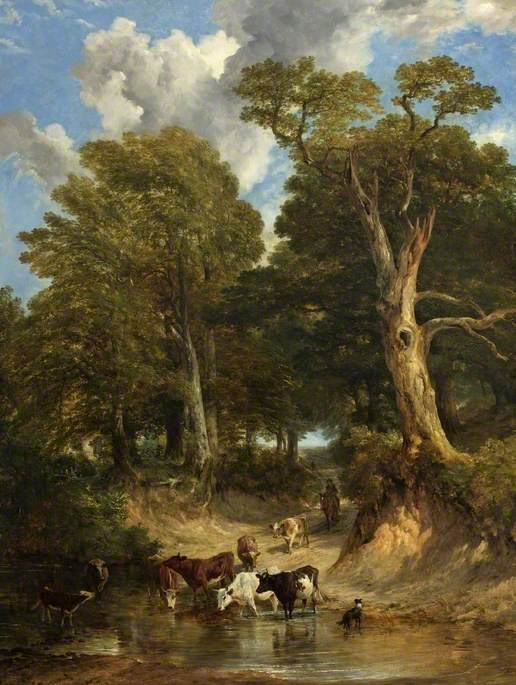
Oak Tree Ford by Frederick Richard Lee

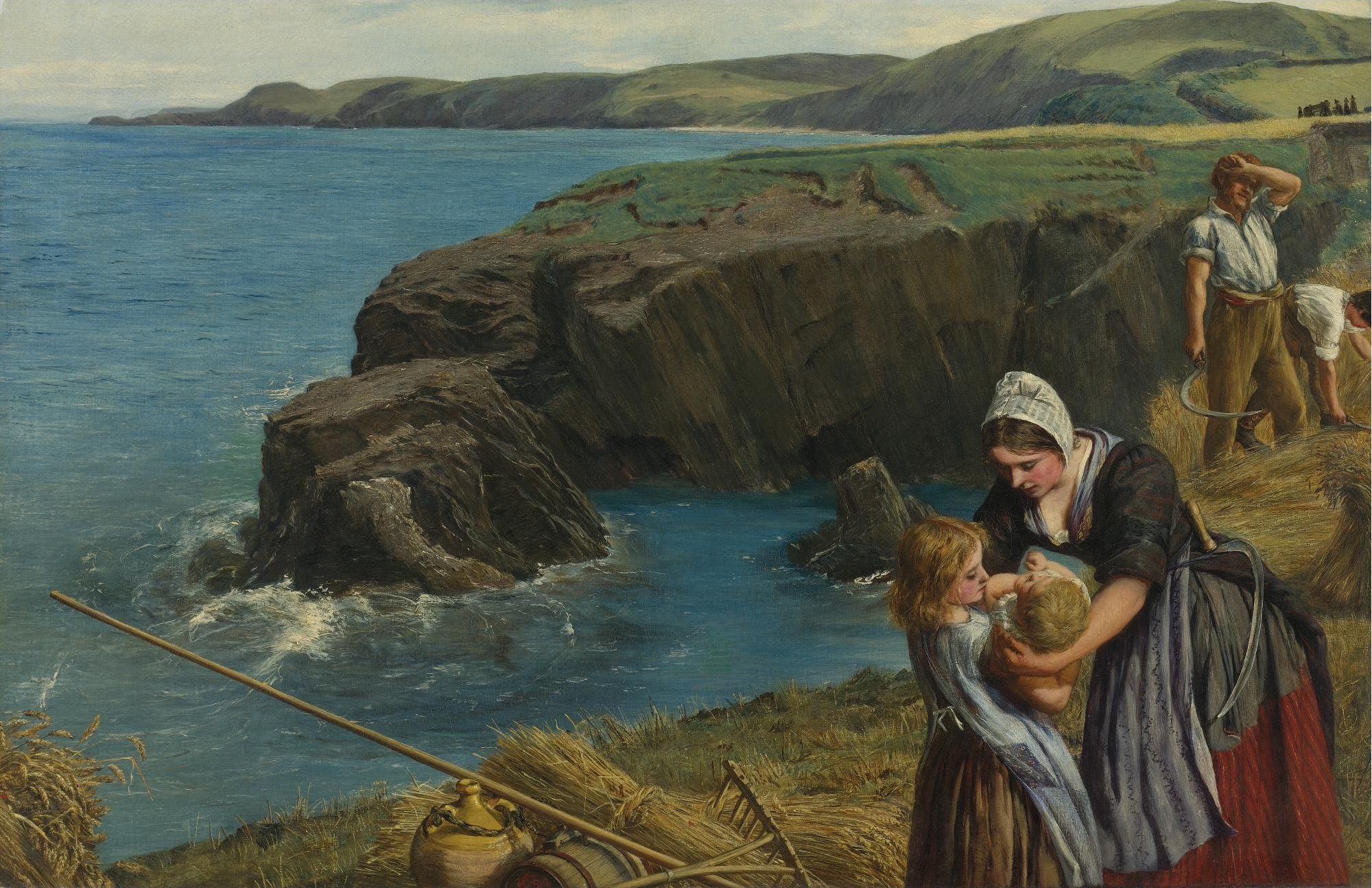
The Acre by the Sea by James Clarke Hook

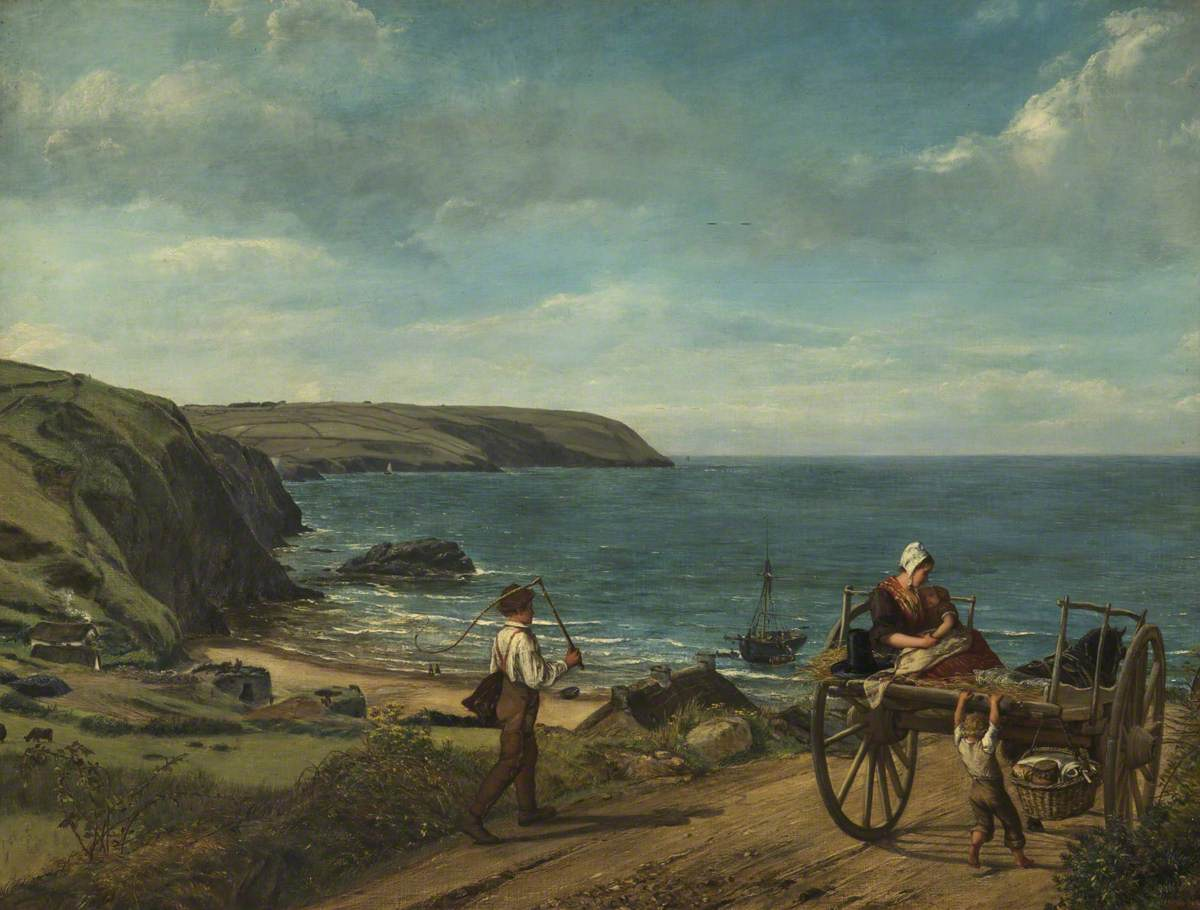
Sea Air by James Clarke Hook

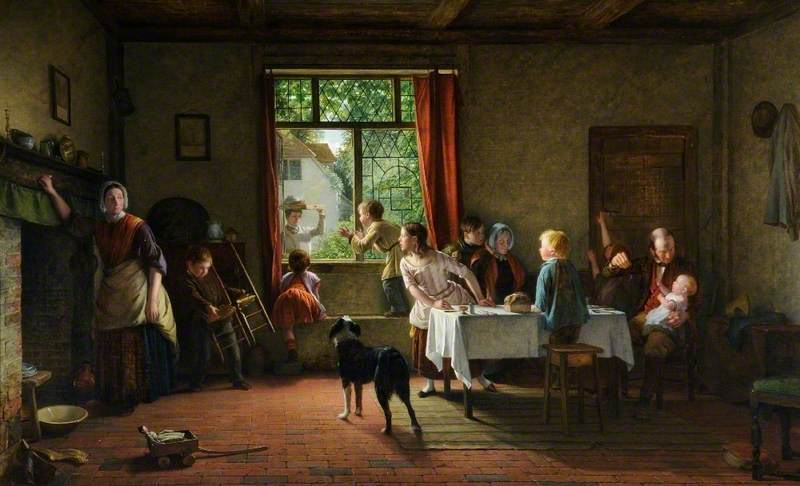
Roast Pig by Thomas Webster

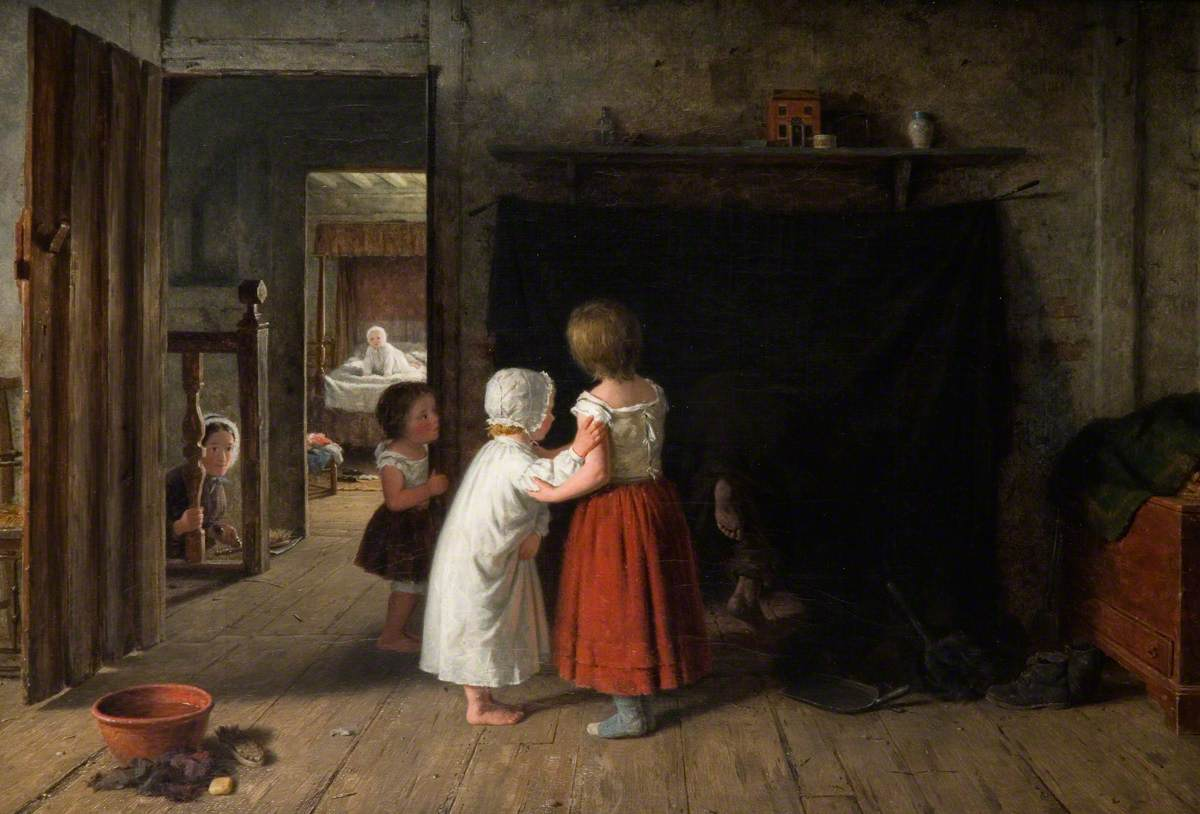
The Chimney Sweep by Frederick Daniel Hardy

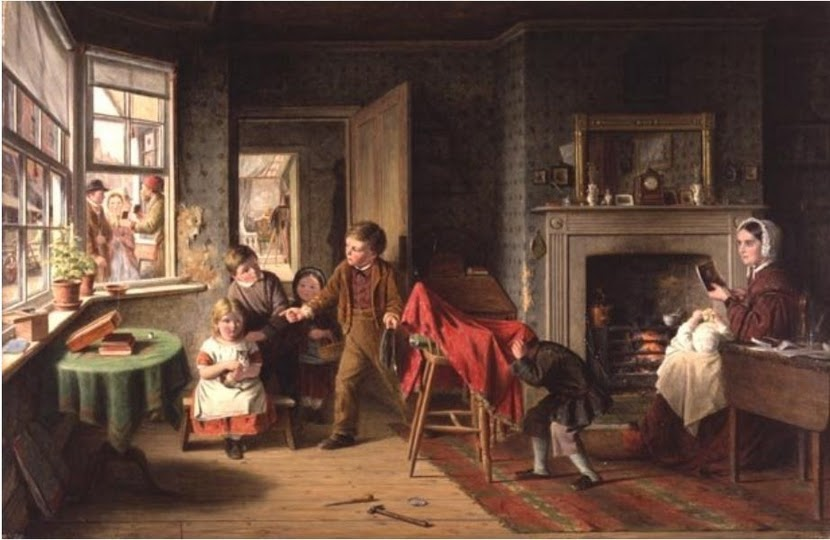
The Young Photographers by Frederick Daniel Hardy

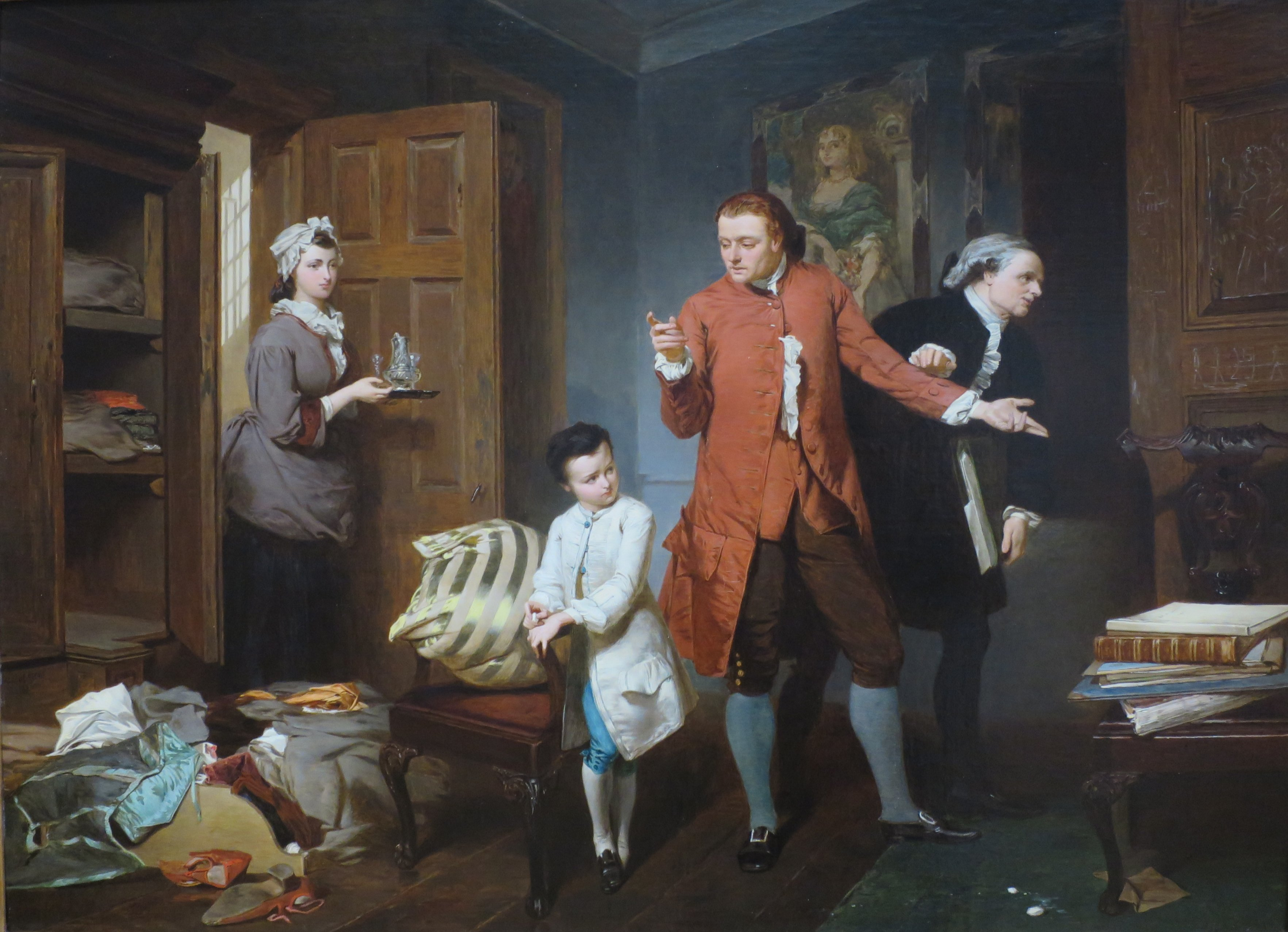
The Painter's First Work by Marcus Stone

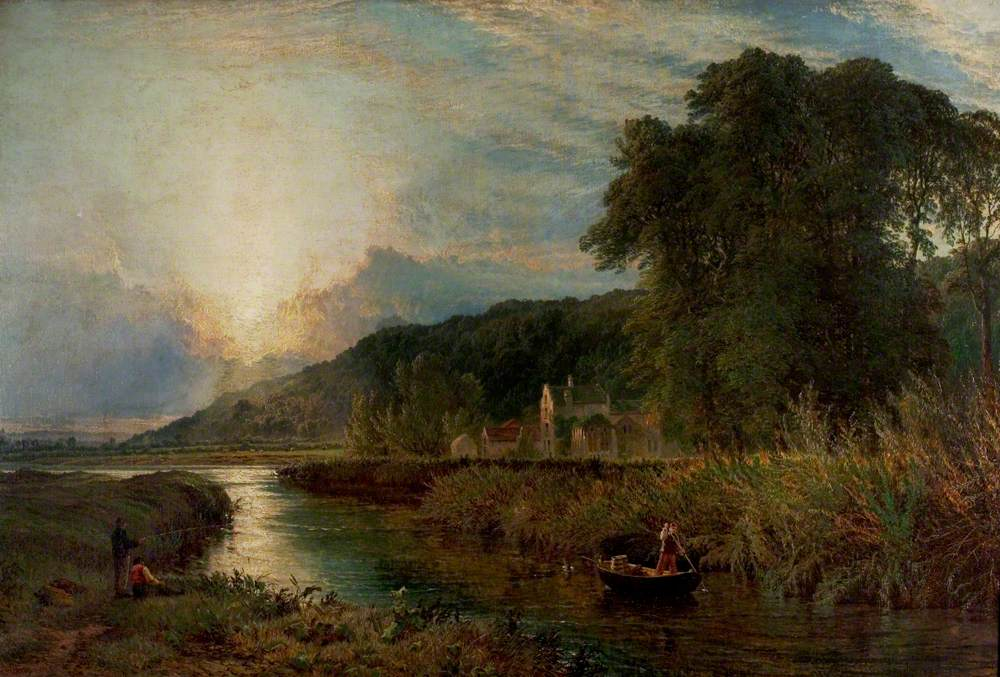
Castle Donington by Henry Dawson

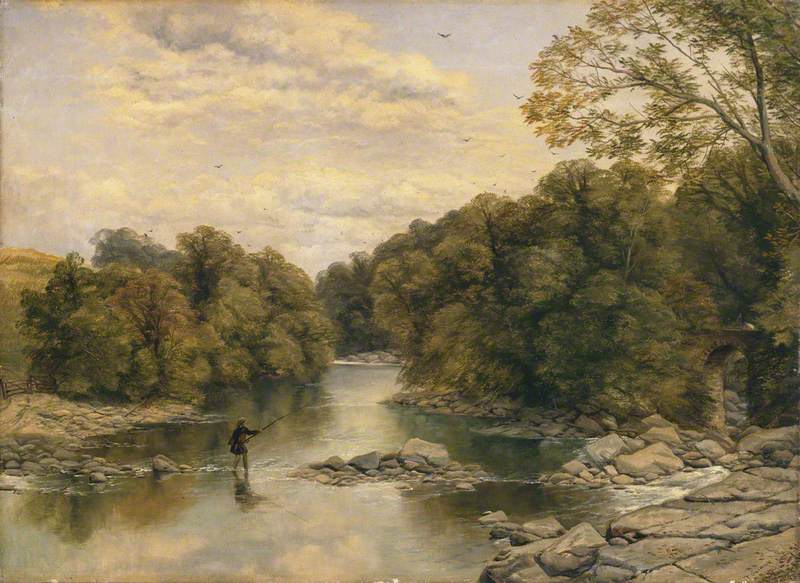
The River Tees at Rokeby by Thomas Creswick

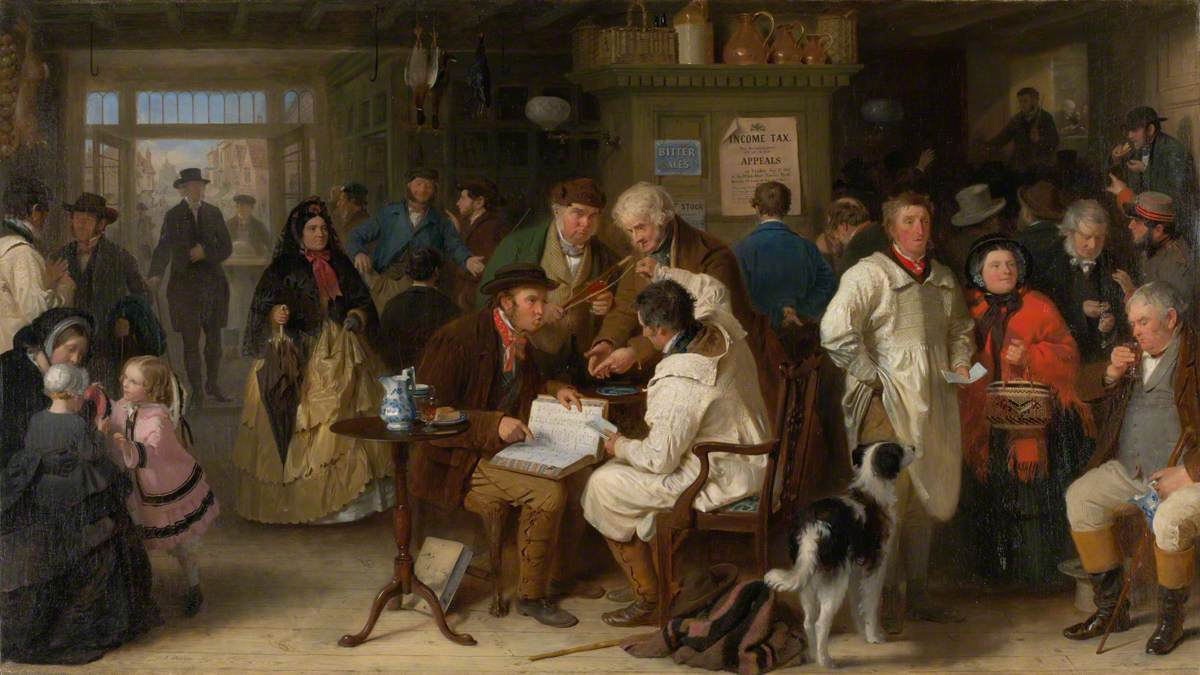
The Income Tax, Day of Appeal by John Morgan

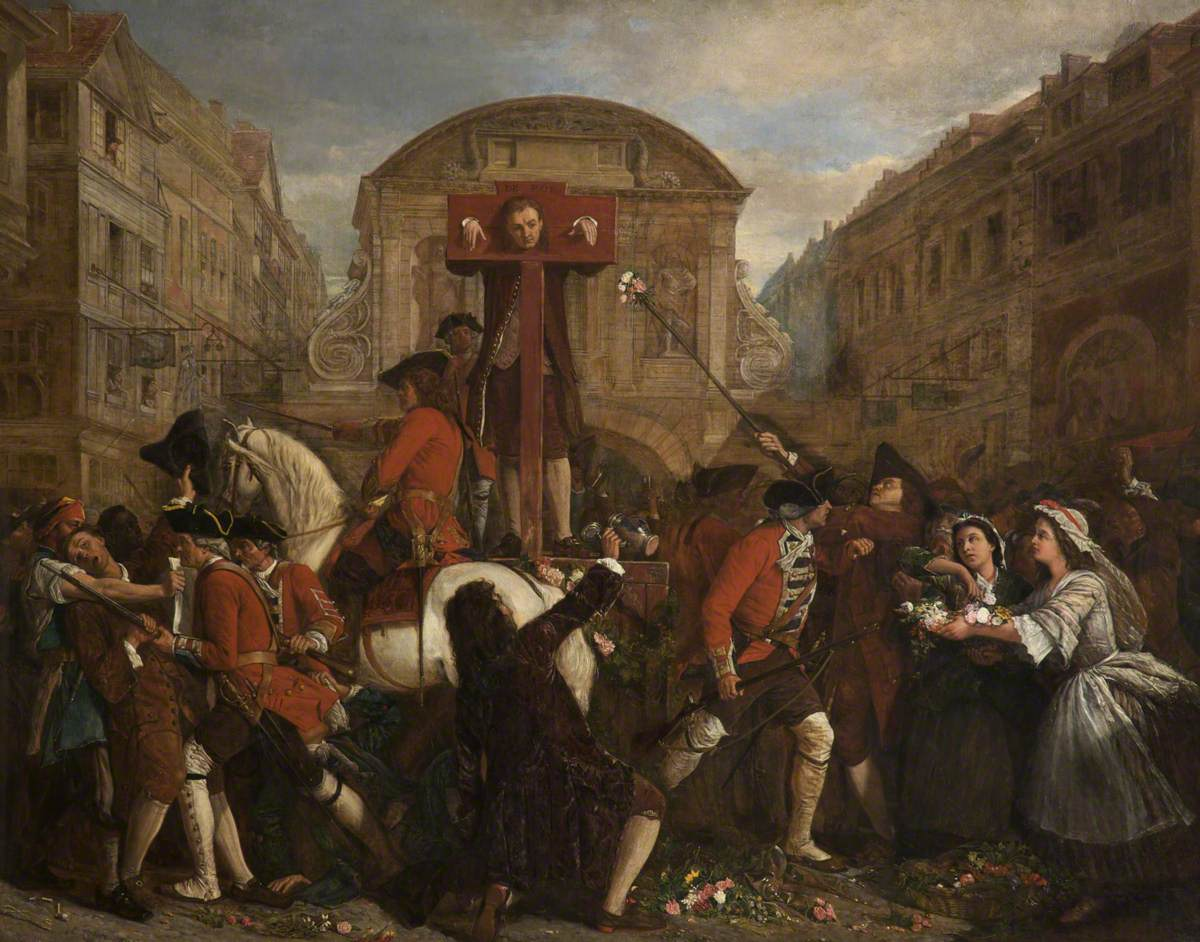
Daniel Defoe in the Pillory by Eyre Crowe

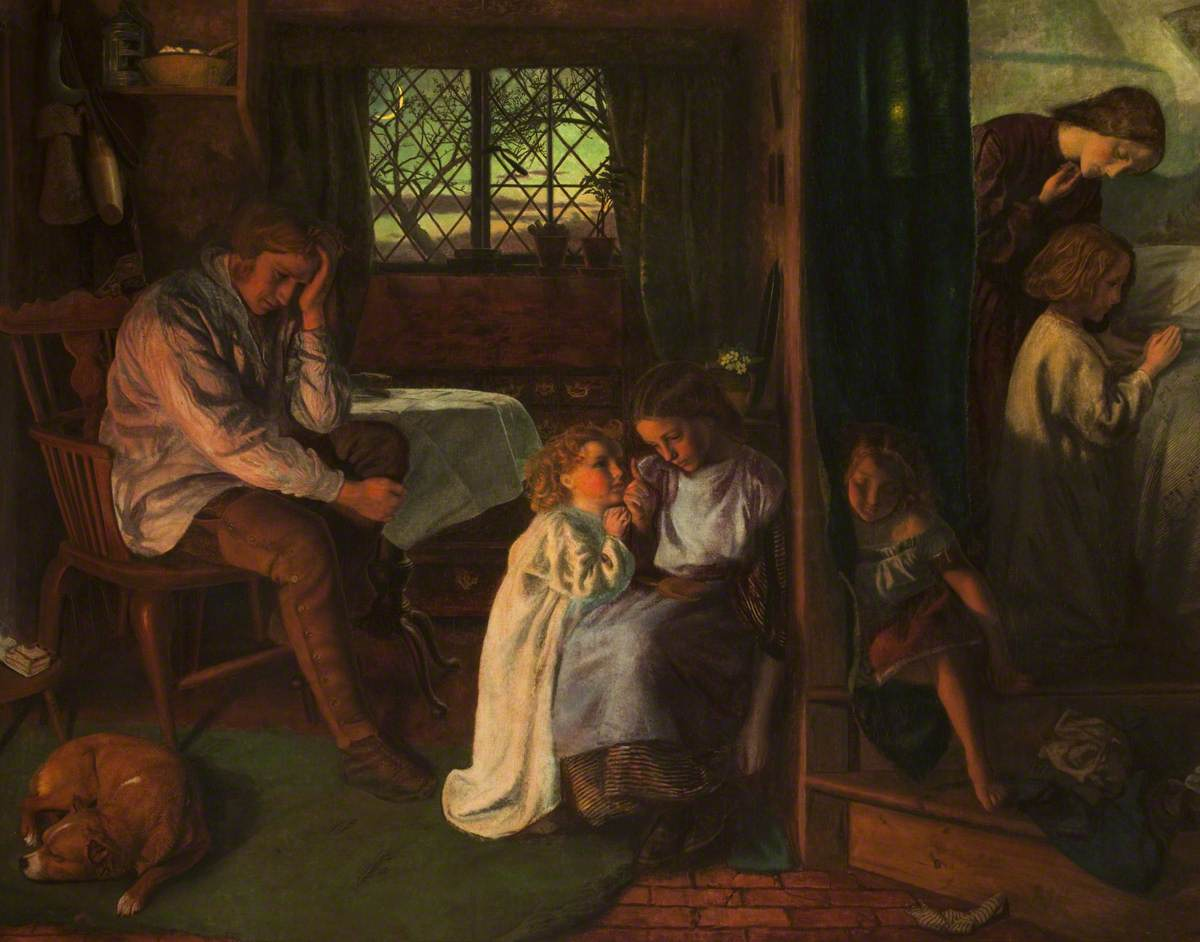
Bedtime by Arthur Hughes

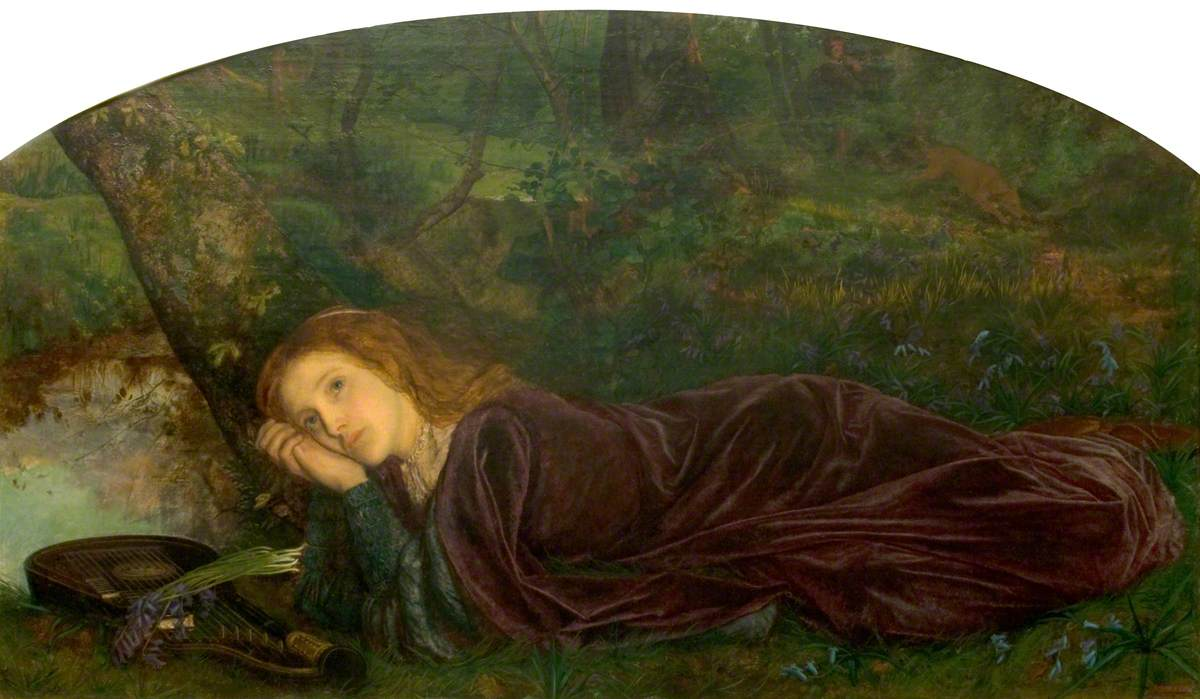
The Rift within the Lute by Arthur Hughes

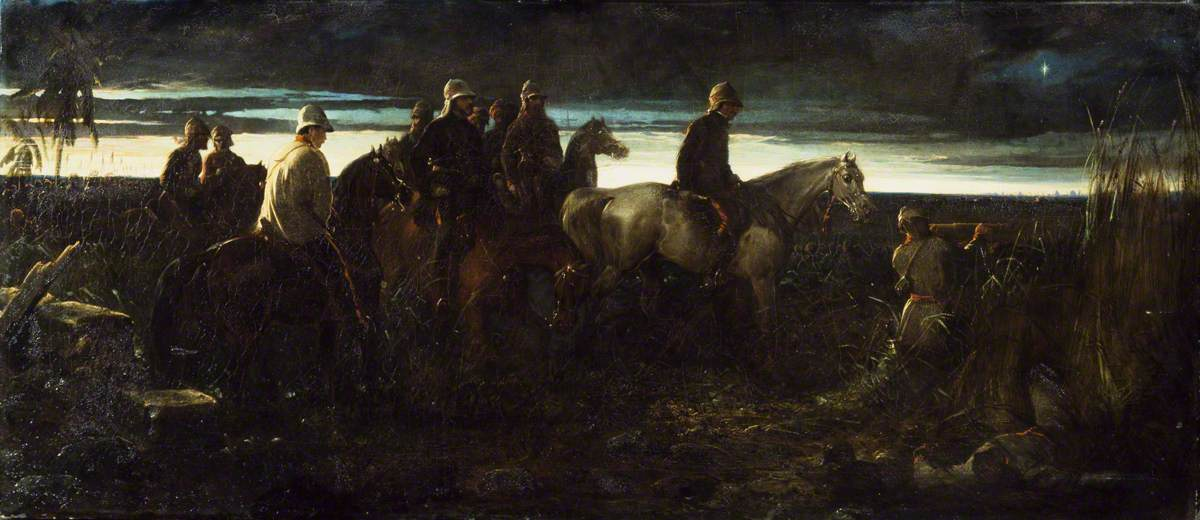
The Dawn of Victory by Thomas Jones Barker

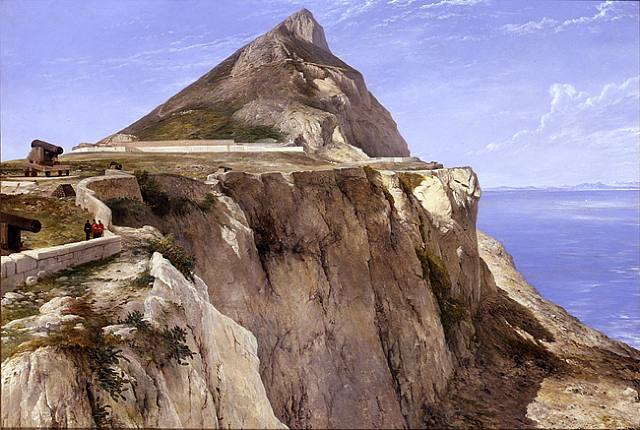
The Rock of Gibraltar by Frederick Richard Lee

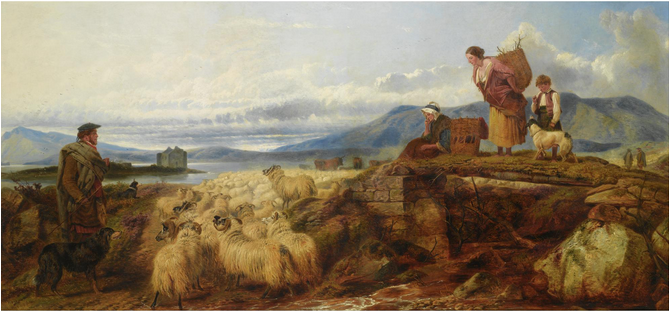
West Highlands with Dunstaffnage Castle by Richard Ansdell

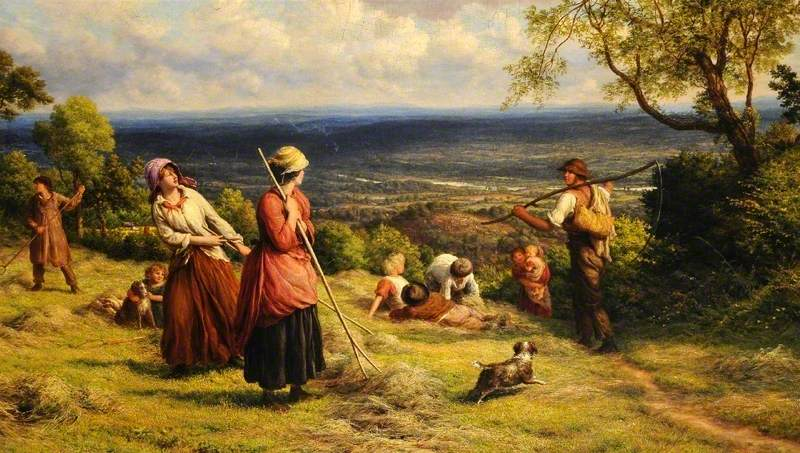
The Haymakers by James Thomas Linnell

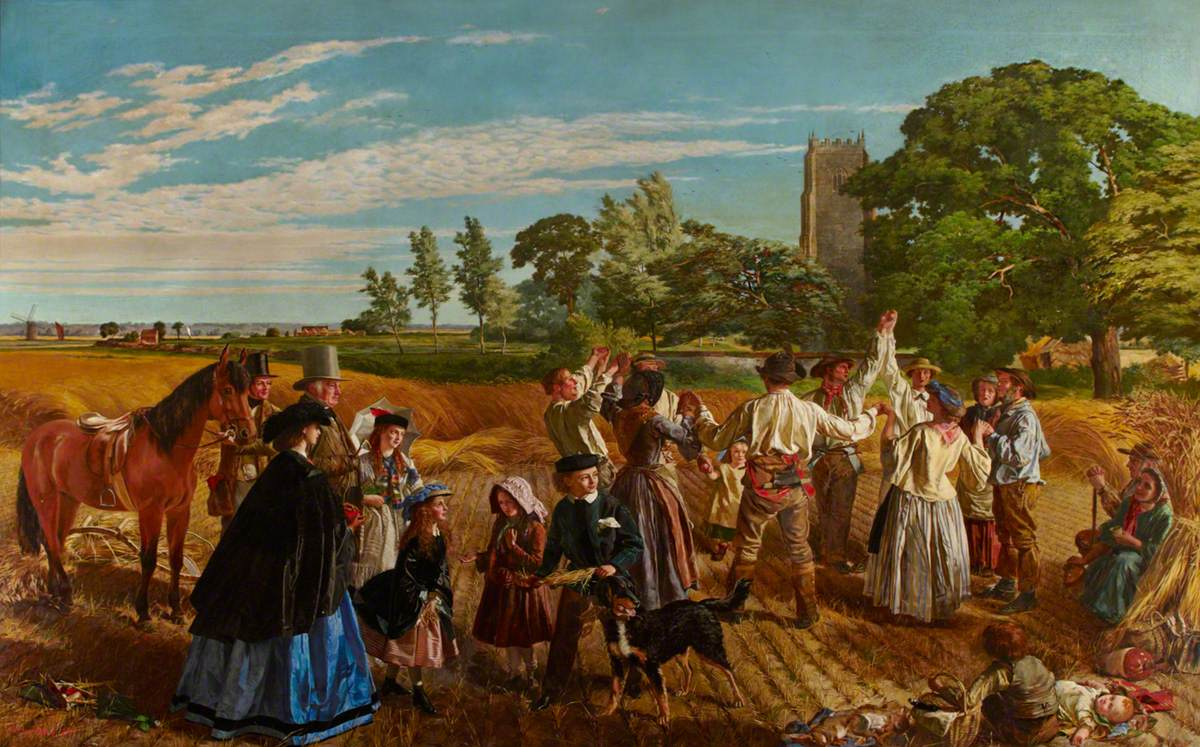
Hallo Largesse by William Maw Egley

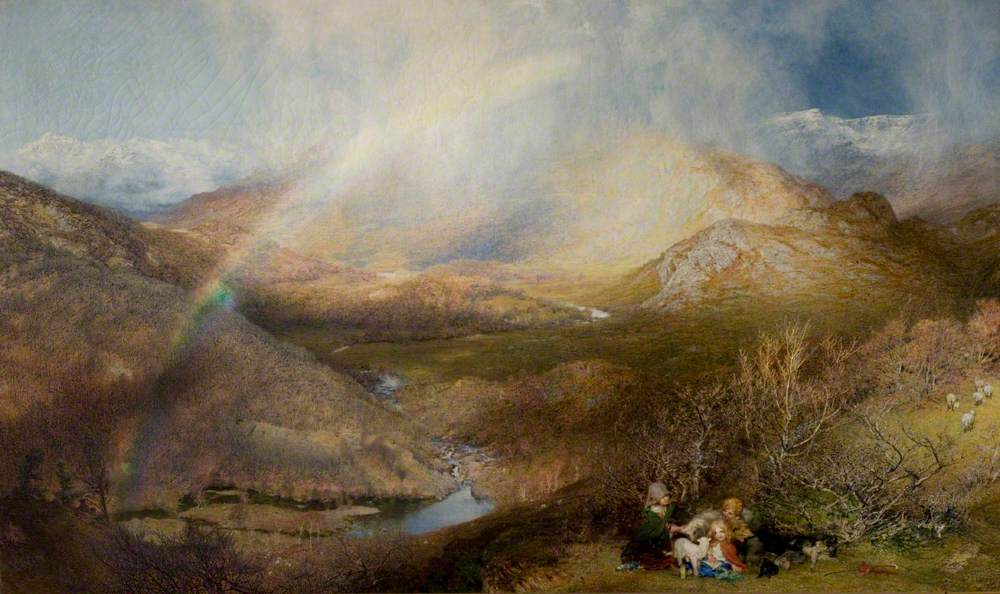
The Rainbow by Henry Clarence Whaite

Sir Walter Raleigh at Durham House by Henry Wallis

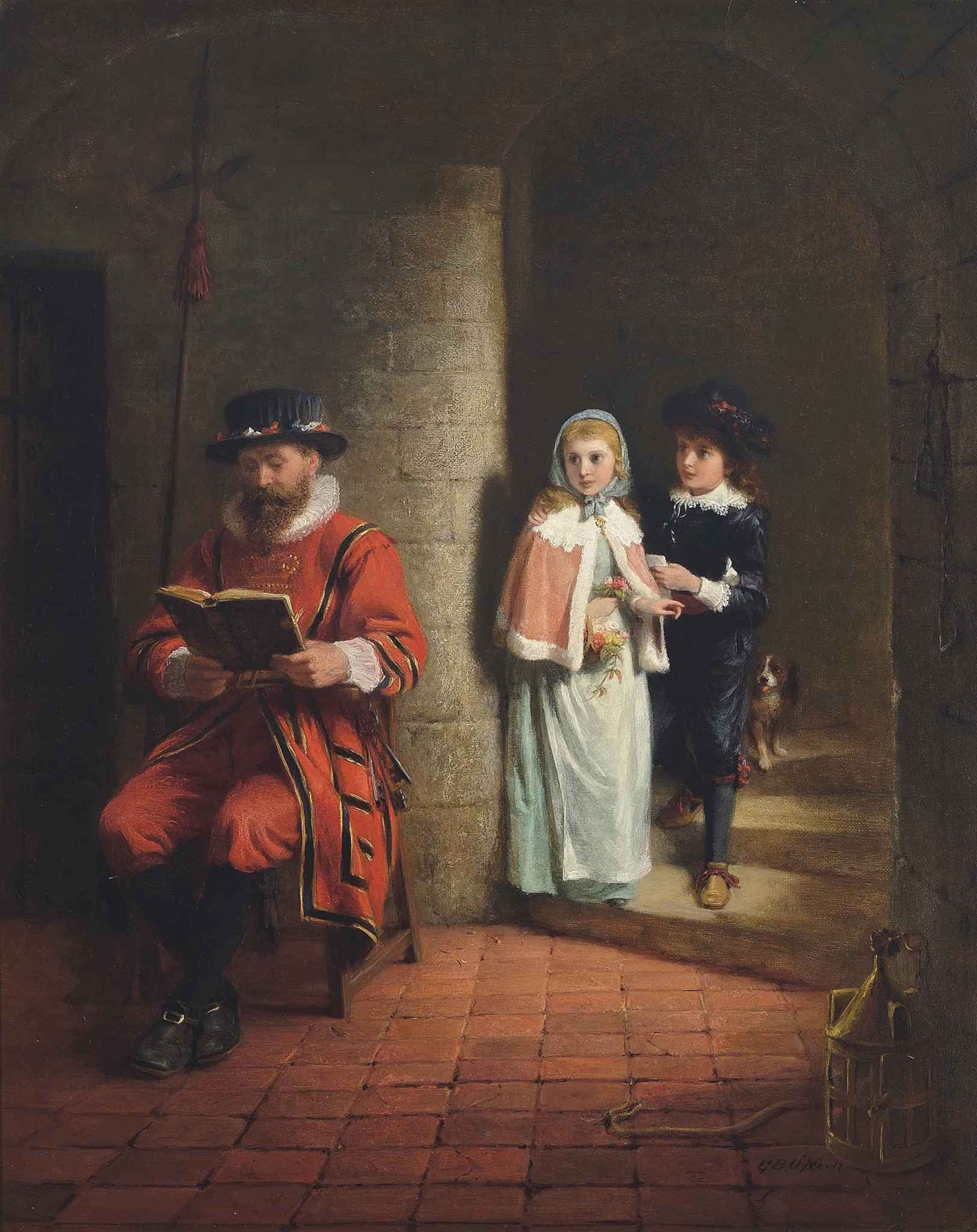
Children at the Tower by George Bernard O'Neill

The Quaker and the Tax-Gatherer by George Bernard O'Neill

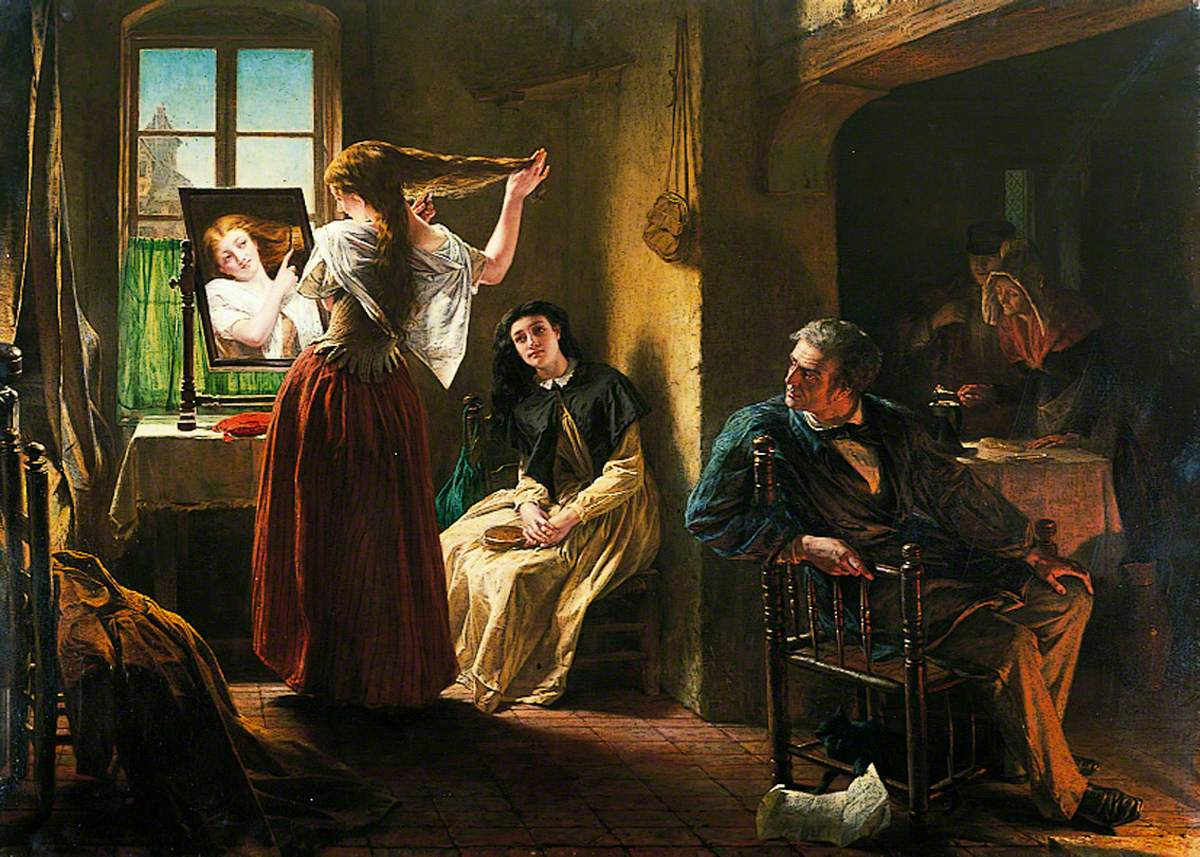
Invention of the Combing-machine by Alfred Elmore

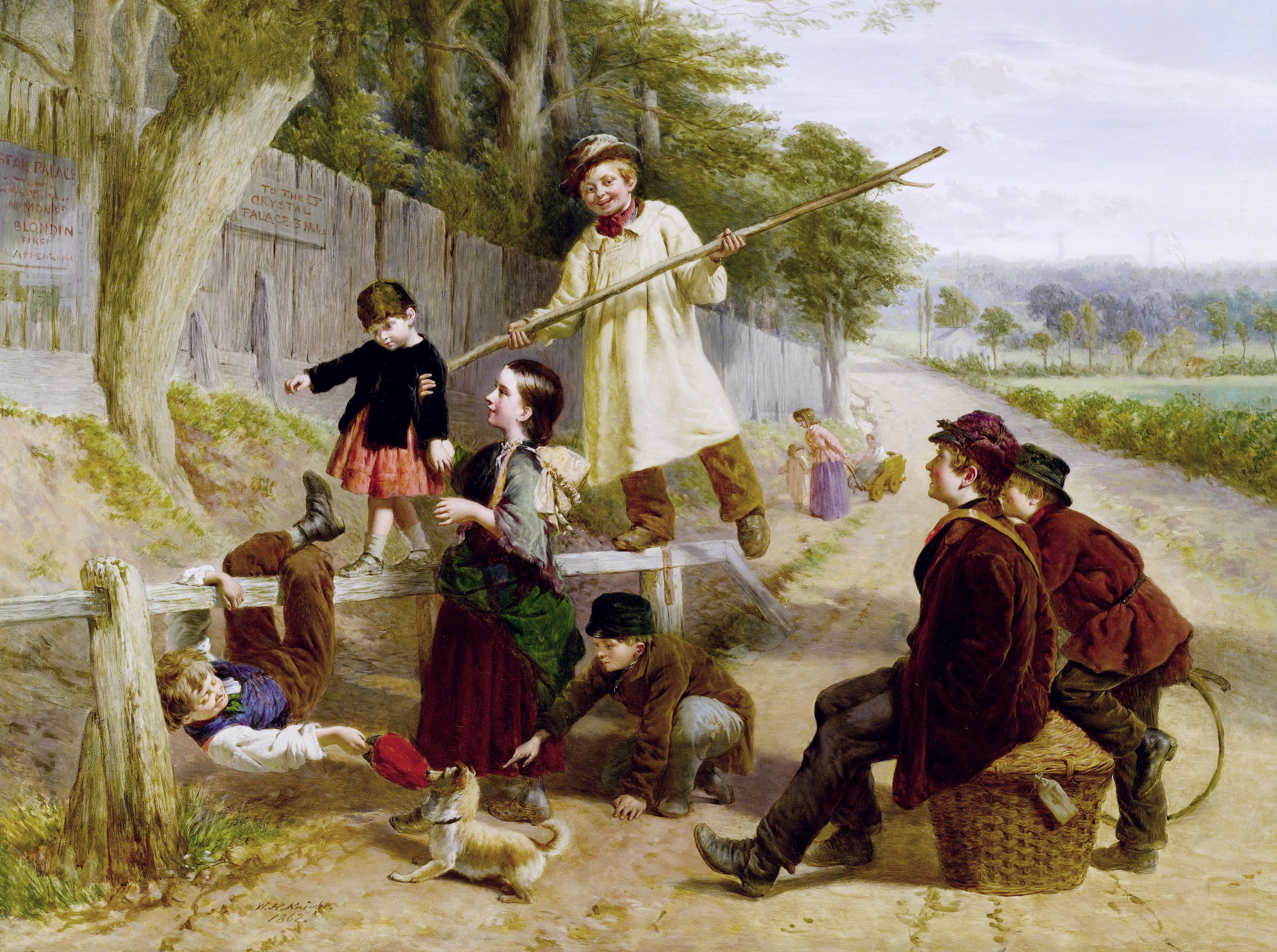
Rivals to Blondin by William Henry Knight

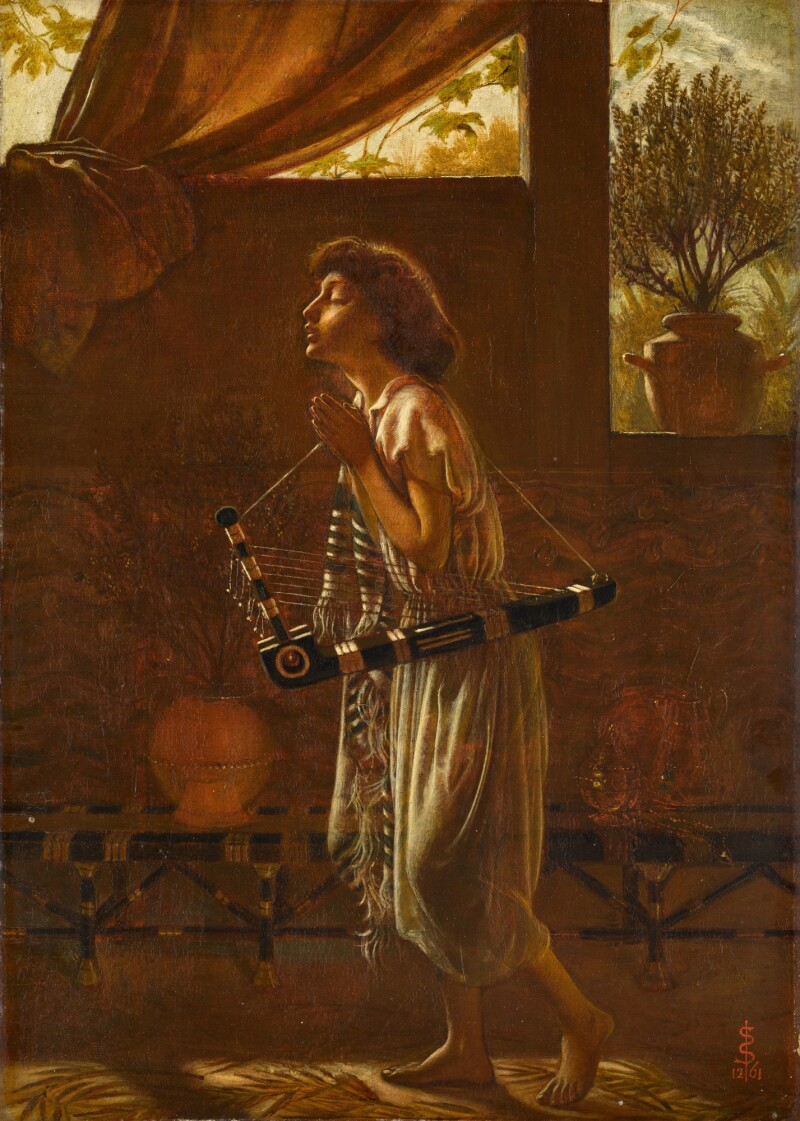
The Child Jeremiah by Simeon Solomon

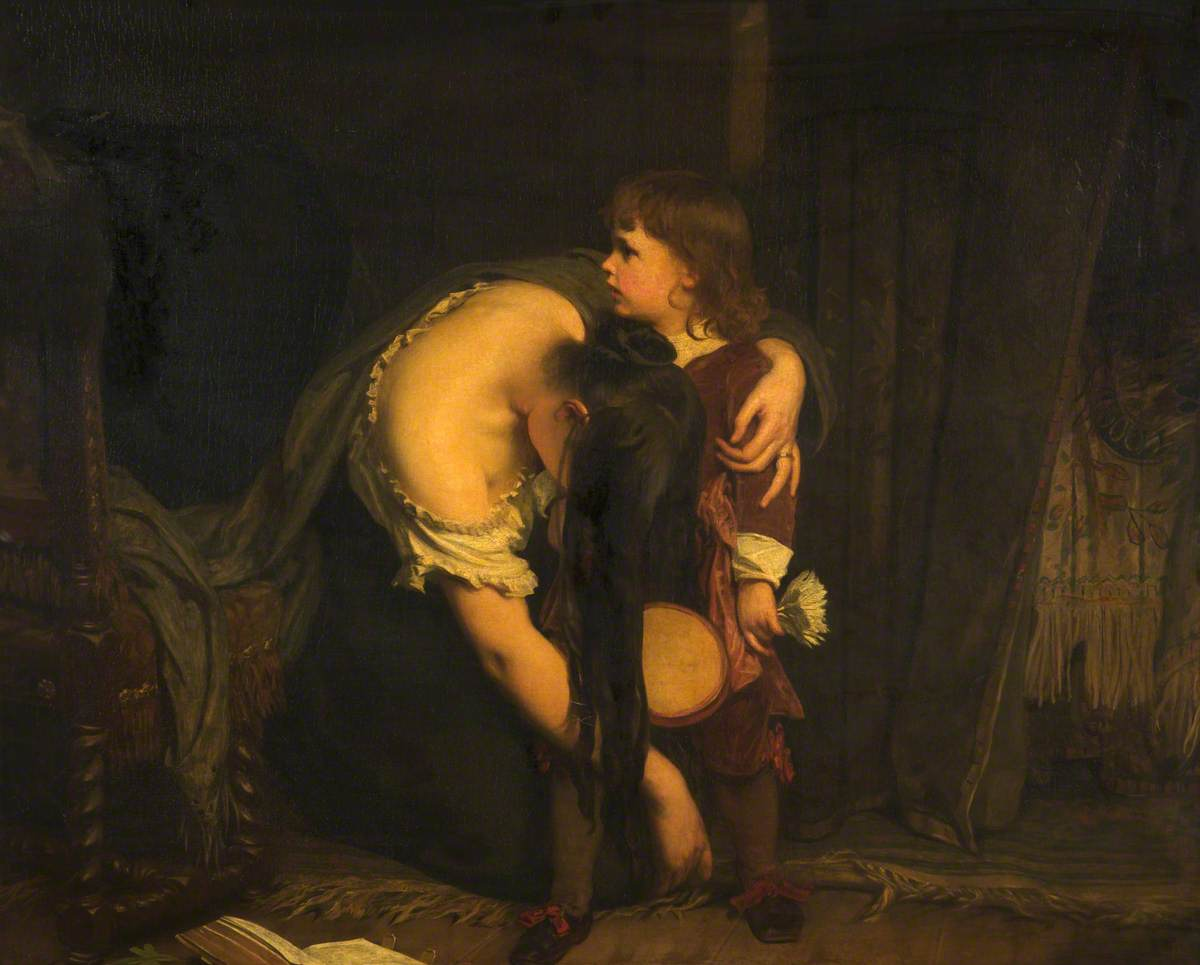
The First Sense of Sorrow by James Sant

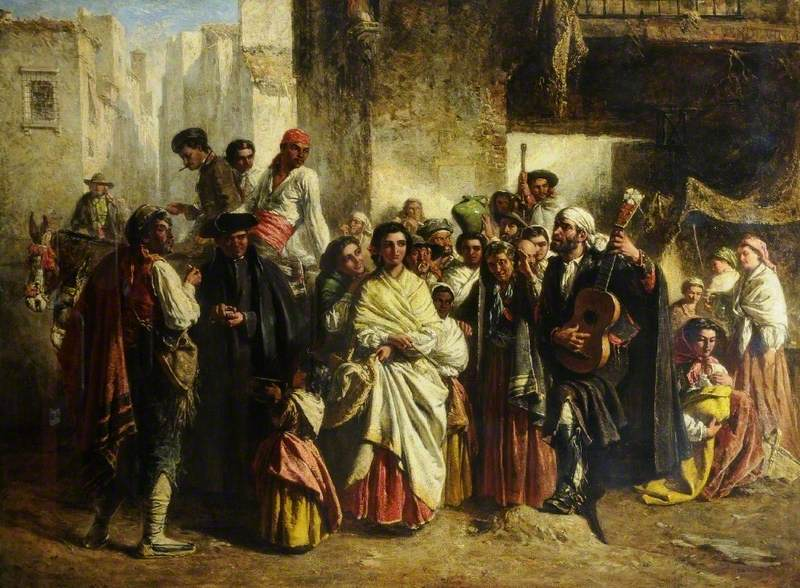
Ballad Singing in Andalucia by Dennis Wood Deane

Panope by William Edward Frost

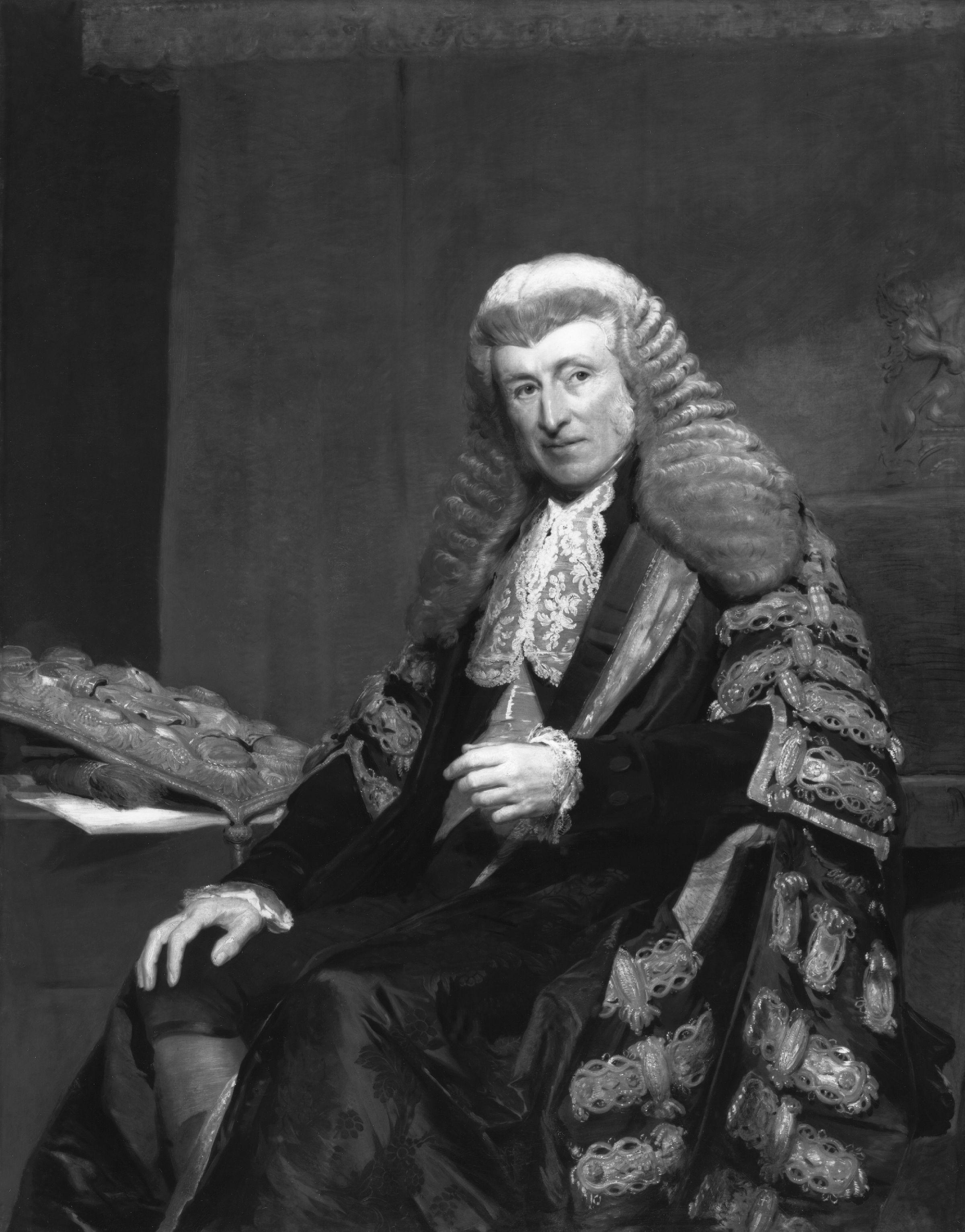
Lord Cranworth by George Richmond by George Richmond

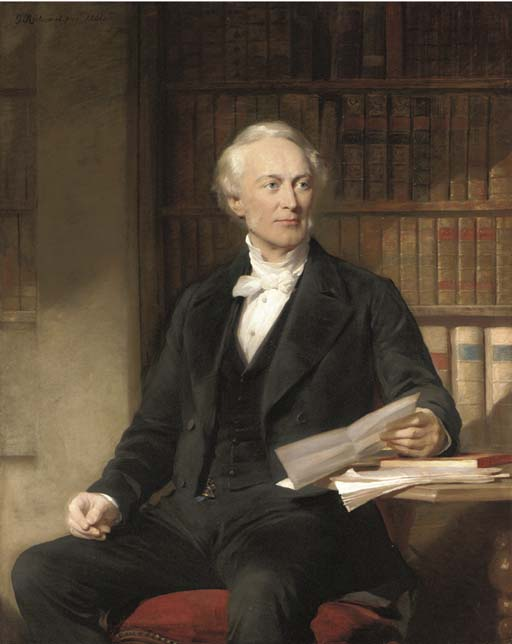
Octavius Wigram

Lady Margaret Beaumont and Her Daughter by George Frederick Watts

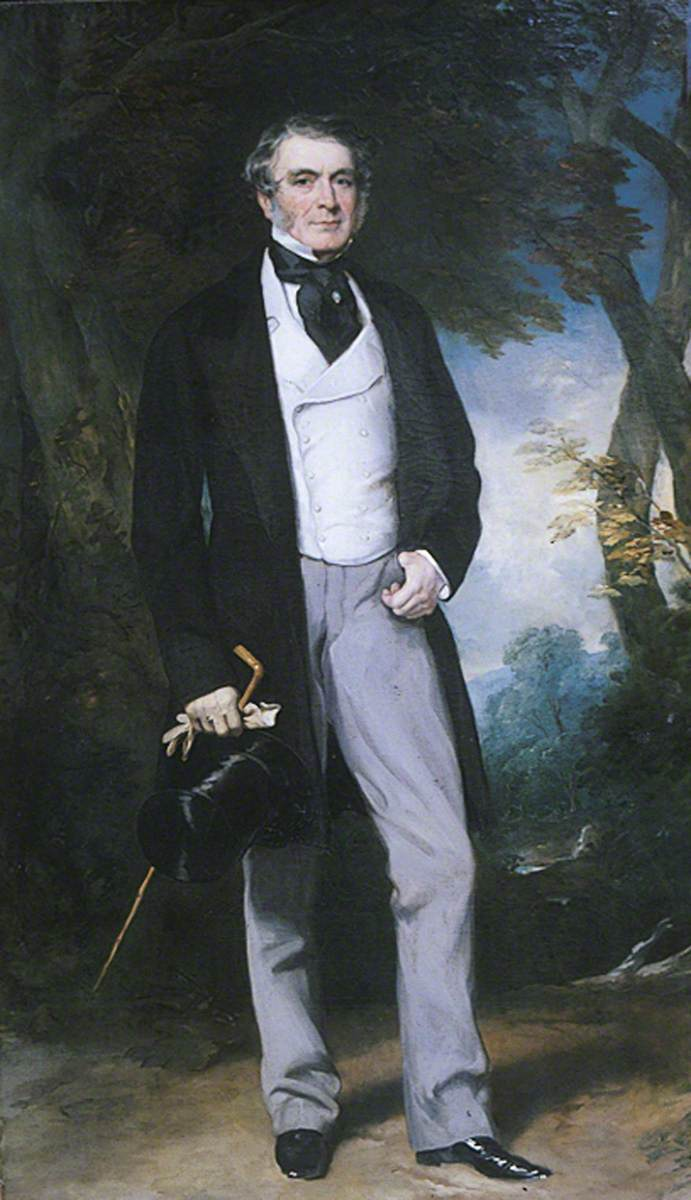
William Beckett by Francis Grant

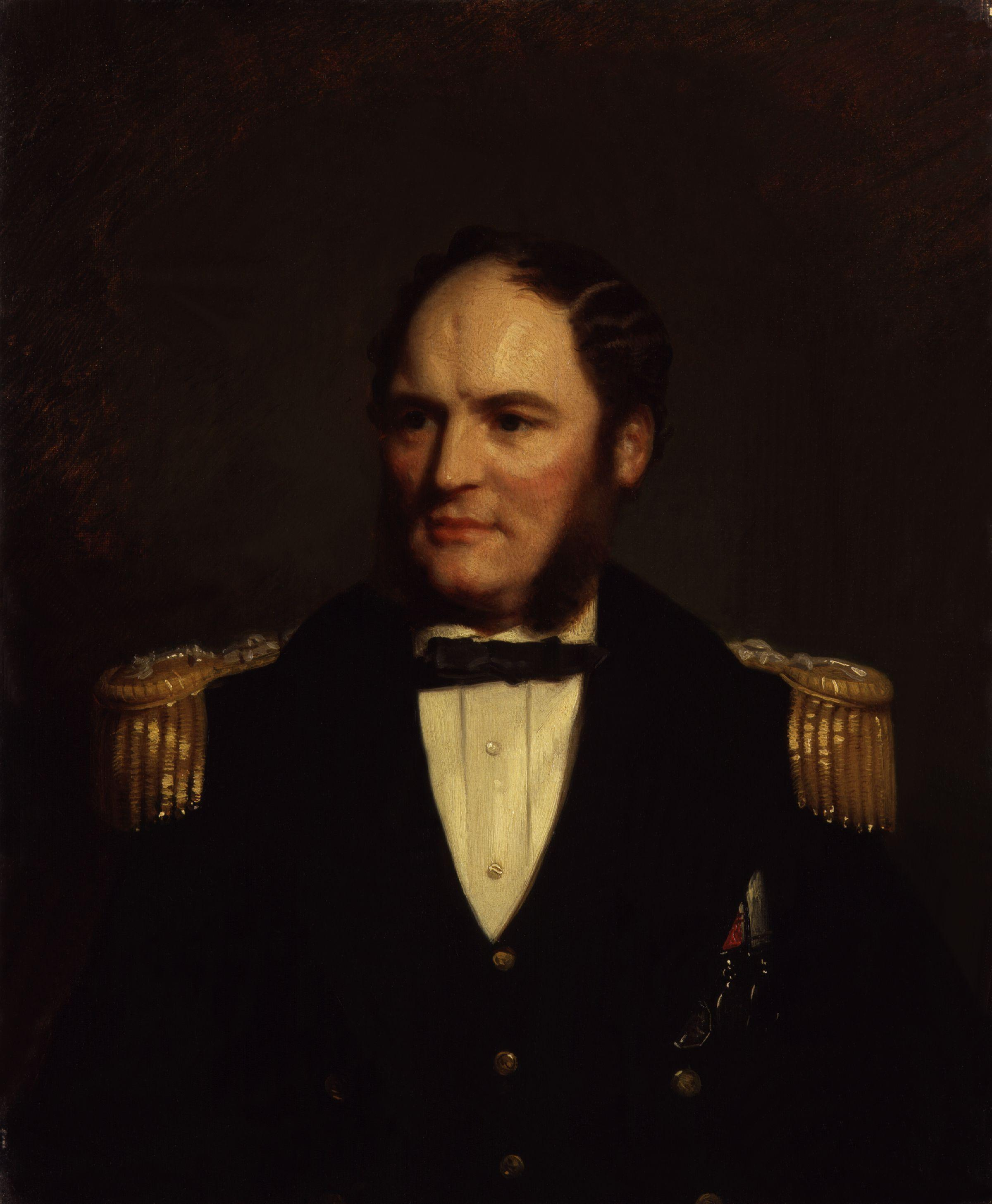
Rochfort Maguire by Stephen Pearce

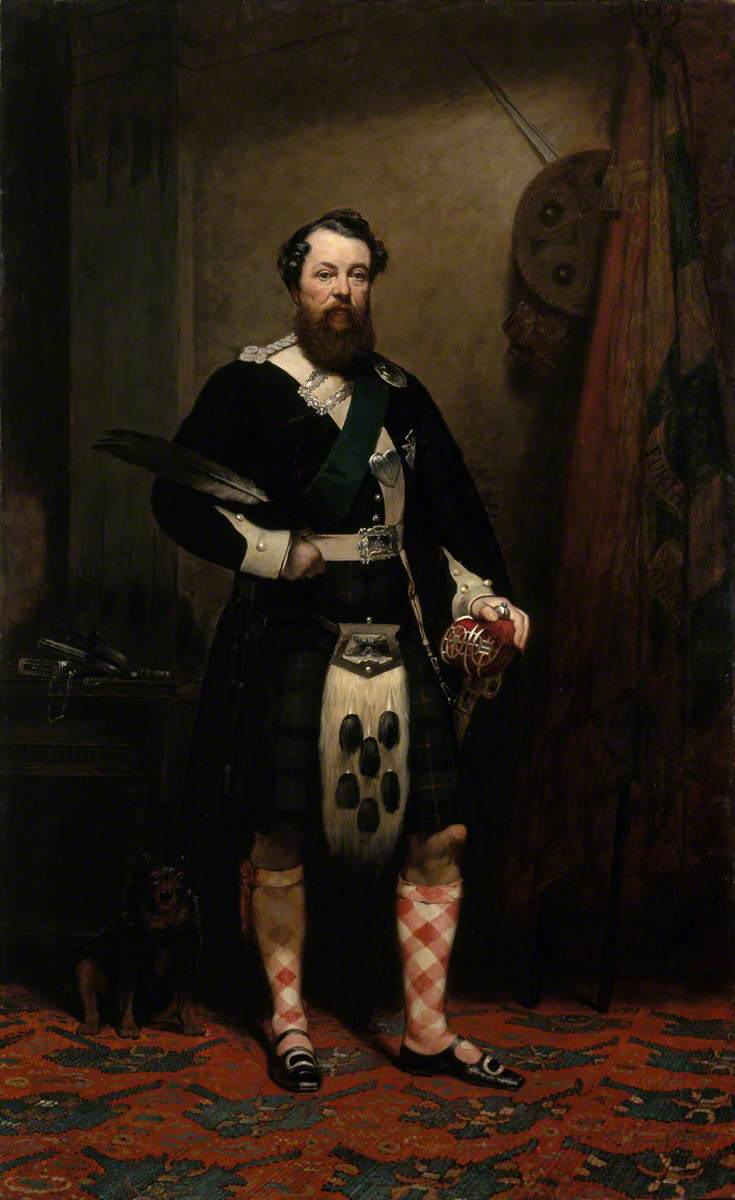
Duke of Atholl by John MacLaren Barclay

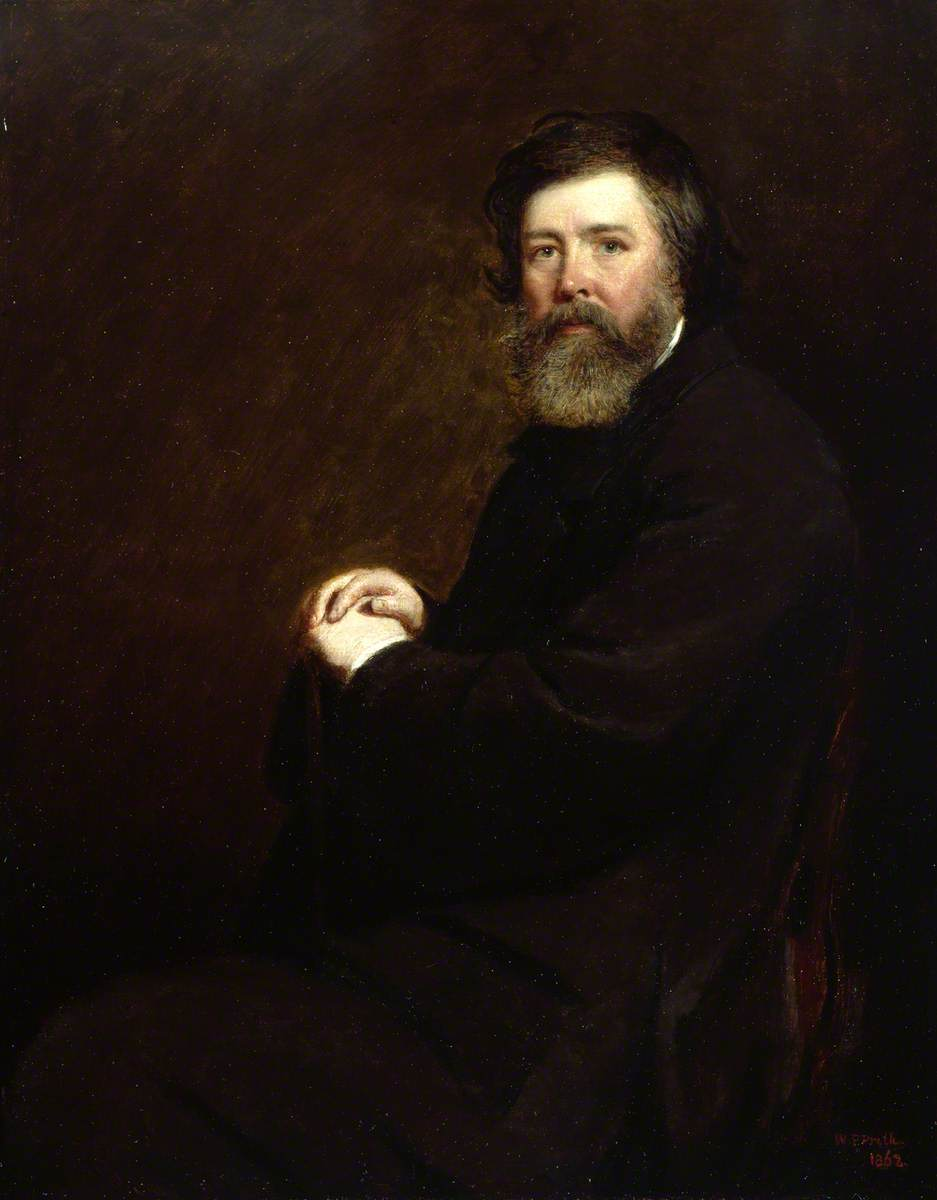
Thomas Creswick by William Powell Frith

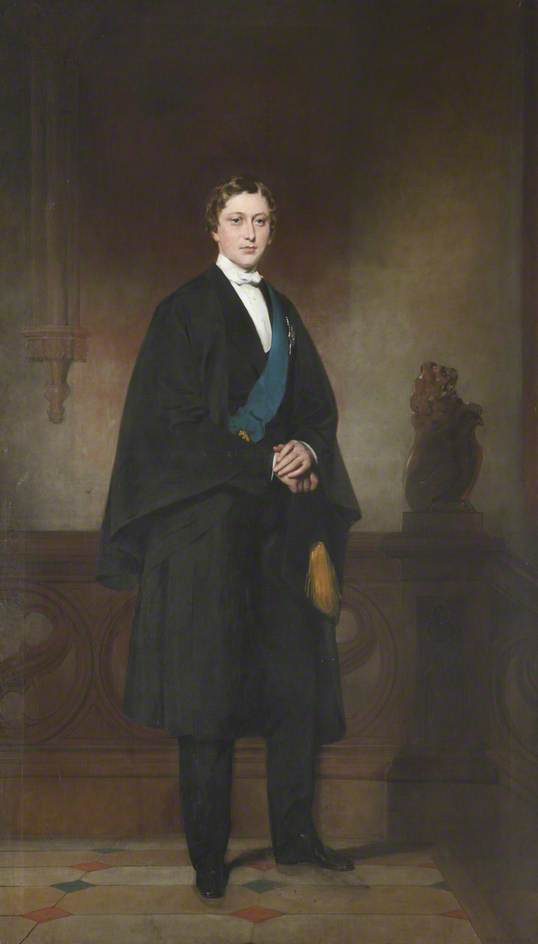
Prince of Wales by John Watson Gordon

== Bibliography ==
- Atlick, Richard Daniel. Paintings from Books: Art and Literature in Britain, 1760-1900. Ohio State University Press, 1986
- Riding, Christine. John Everett Millais. Harry N. Abrams, 2006.
