= The Coast of Brittany =

Painting by James McNeill Whistler

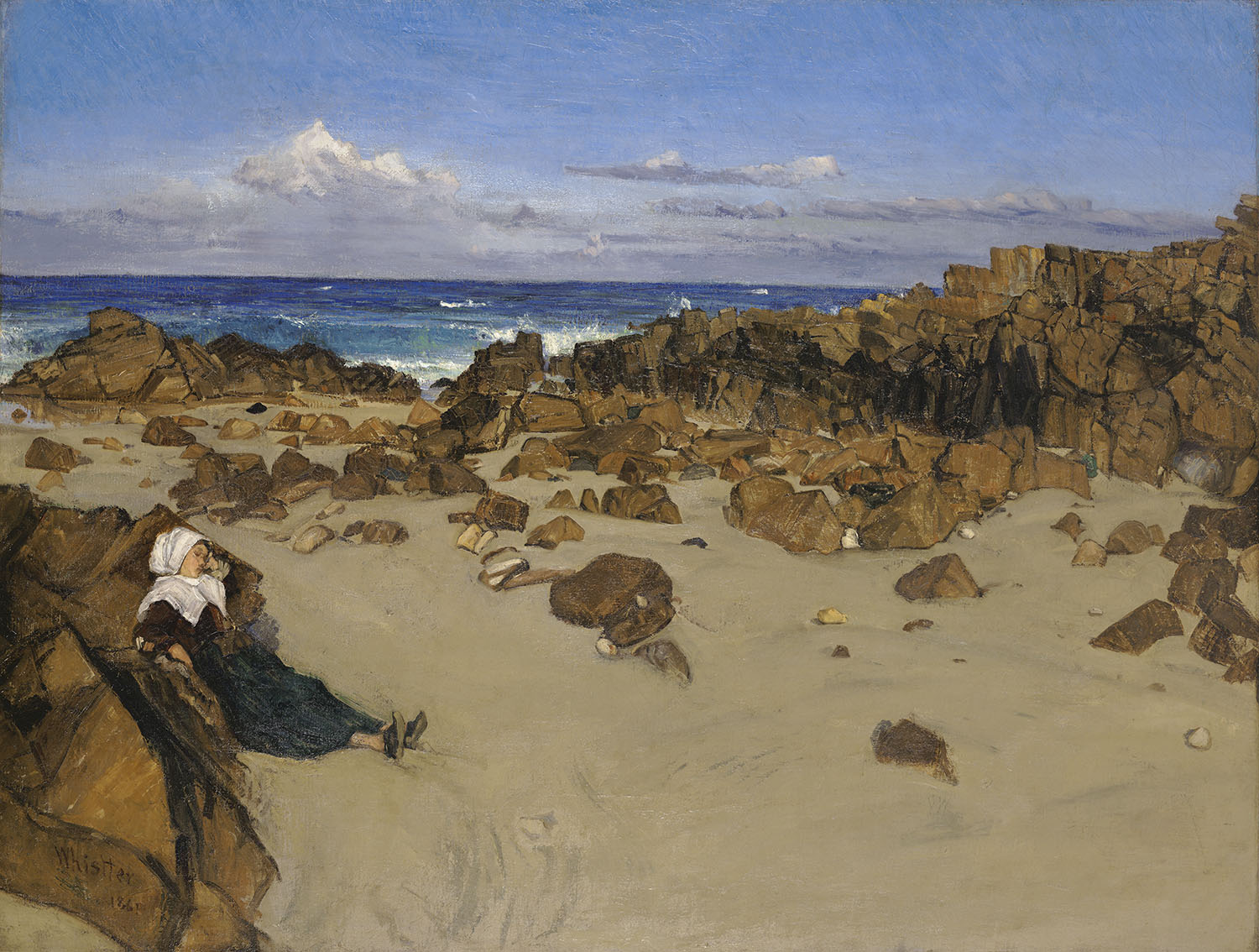
- Artist: James McNeill Whistler
- Year: 1861
- Type: Oil on canvas, landscape painting
- Dimensions: 87.3 cm × 115.6 cm (34.4 in × 45.5 in)
- Location: Wadsworth Atheneum, Hartford

The Coast of Brittany is an 1861 landscape painting by the Anglo-American artist James McNeill Whistler. It depicts a view on the beach at Perros-Guirec in Brittany western France, looking out to the English Channel. It is also known by the alternative title Alone with the Tide, the name under which he first exhibited it.

Whistler had travelled to the Breton coastline from London to recover from a bout of illness. The painting was displayed at the Royal Academy Exhibition of 1862 held at the National Gallery in London. It is now part of the collection of the Wadsworth Atheneum in Connecticut, which acquired it in 1925.

== See also ==
- List of paintings by James McNeill Whistler

== Bibliography ==
- Ayres, Linda. The Spirit of Genius: Art at the Wadsworth Atheneum Hudson Hills Press, 1992.
- Chaleyssin, Patrick. James McNeill Whistler. Parkstone International, 2011
- Jacobi, Carol (ed.) James McNeill Whistler. Tate Publishing, 2026.
- Merrill, Linda. After Whistler: The Artist and His Influence on American Painting. Yale University Press, 2003.
- Sutherland, Daniel E. Whistler: A Life for Art's Sake. Yale University Press, 2014.
