= Thomas Berry (disambiguation) =

Thomas Berry (1914–2009) was a Catholic priest of the Passionist order, cultural historian and ecotheologian.

Thomas Berry may also refer to:

- Tom Berry (baseball) (1842–1915), baseball player of the 1870s for the Philadelphia Athletics
- Tom Berry (South Dakota politician) (1879–1951), governor of South Dakota
- Tom Berry (boxer) (1890–1943), English boxer of the 1910s, 1920s and 1930s
- Tom Berry (Montana politician), Republican member of the Montana legislature
- Tom Berry (rugby union) (1911–1993), rugby union player and administrator
- Tom Berry (filmmaker), Canadian screenwriter, producer and businessman
- Tom Berry (Australian footballer) (born 2000), Australian rules footballer
- Sir Thomas Berry (politician) (died 1698), English politician
- Thomas S. Berry (1882–1962), English harness racing driver and horse trainer

== See also ==
- Thomas Barry (disambiguation)
- Thomas Bury (disambiguation)
