= Thomas Barrie =

British subject, d. 1538

- Died: 1538 (487 years ago); Newbury, Berkshire
- Cause of death: Acute stress reaction
- Occupation: Almoner
- Employer: Donnington Hospital
- Criminal charge: Spreading seditious rumours (foretelling monarch's death)
- Criminal penalty: Day in pillory (with cropping)

Thomas Barrie (died 1538 in Newbury, Berkshire) was an English almoner who was found guilty of spreading rumours about the death of Henry VIII in 1538 and was pilloried in the market square at Newbury. It was reported that he died from shock as a result of his punishment.

== Biography ==
Barrie was an almsman at Donnington Hospital where he worked until he died, living in one of the institution's almshouses. In 1538, he was accused of spreading seditious rumours about the death of Henry VIII. This was around the time of the King's excommunication from the Catholic Church; Henry did not die until nine years later. Though Barrie's rumours were supposedly well-sourced, this was irrelevant as foretelling the monarch's death was counted as treason. This was shown two years later in 1540, when Walter Hungerford, 1st Baron Hungerford of Heytesbury, was charged with the same crime, along with breaking the new Buggery Act, and was beheaded on Tower Hill.

=== Punishment and death ===
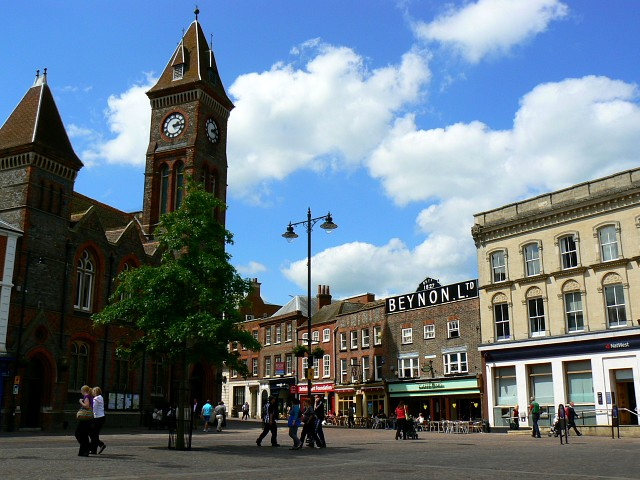
Newbury's market place was used for public humiliation punishments

Barrie's punishment was to stand in the pillory in the market square on market day and, for further ridicule, he was to be cropped. This punishment (also given to John Bastwick 100 years later) involved nailing Barrie's ears to the pillory's frame on either side of the head hole. At the end of the trading day, he was released from the pillory by cutting off his ears.

Barrie is said to have died of shock following his punishment. His earless ghost reportedly haunts the market place, moaning in agony. However, other sources suggest that Barrie may have lived for a year or so.
