= Ear cropping =

Ear cropping may refer to:

- Cropping (animal), the removal of part or all of the external flaps of an animal's ear
- Cropping (punishment), the removal of a person's ears as an act of physical punishment
