= Salford Museum and Art Gallery =

Art gallery and museum in Salford, England

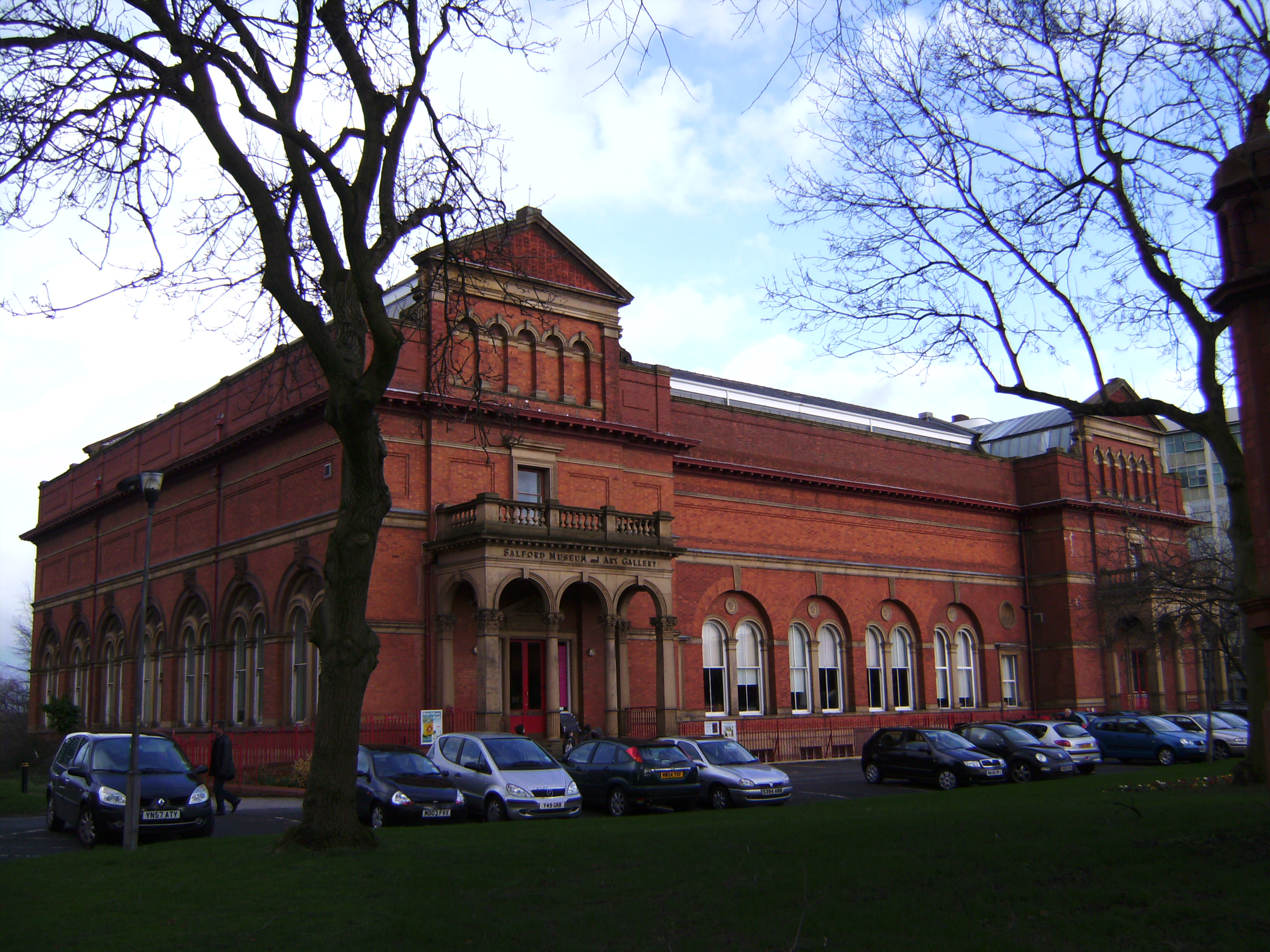
- Salford Museum and Art Gallery

- Location within Greater Manchester
- Established: 1850; 176 years ago
- Location: Peel Park, Salford, Greater Manchester
- Coordinates: 53°29′06″N 2°16′18″W
- Public transit access: Salford Crescent
- Website: salfordmuseum.com

Salford Museum and Art Gallery, in Peel Park, Salford, Greater Manchester, opened to the public in November 1850 as the Royal Museum and Public Library. The gallery and museum are devoted to the history of Salford and Victorian art and architecture.

== Foundation ==
Along with Queens Park and Phillips Park in Manchester, the Lark Hill estate and mansion were purchased by public subscription and opened to the public as Peel Park and Royal Museum and Public Library, in November 1850. In 1874 Edward Langworthy, former mayor of Salford and early supporter of the museum, left a £10,000 bequest to the museum which was used to build the west wing, named the Langworthy Wing, connecting the north and south wings. This wing was constructed over three storeys and "was built of brick with stone dressing with a glass and Welch-slate roof, with a pediment gable"; today it serves as the public entrance. Throughout the years the popularity of the museum increased but in 1936 the fabric of the original building, Lark Hill Mansion, was found to be unsound and was demolished due to structural instability.

The new wing, which was designed in the same style as the Langworthy Wing, took two years to be completed and opened in 1938. The decision to "echo the Langworthy Wing in the 1930s is remarkable in the architectural climate of the time and it is tempting to argue that Walker's addition is the first Victorian revival building in the country." The building development was a gradual evolution which was commenced by different architects evolving their ideas at different times. Throughout its development the building has achieved "a degree of architectural consistency as a result of nearly a century of evolution." More than 160,000 visitors were attracted to the museum in its first year to explore casts of antique statues, collection of paintings, Egyptian and Oriental antiques and other significant objects and exhibitions. The number of visitors steadily increased year by year, and in five years had reached 1.6 million.

== Architecture ==
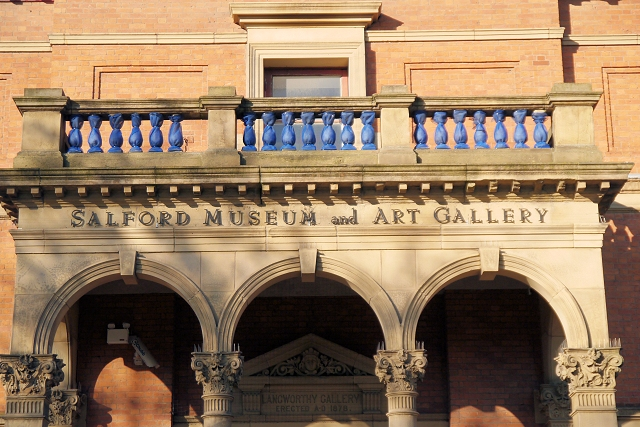
Salford Museum and Art Gallery is noted for its Italianate Renaissance architecture

The Grade II listed Salford Museum and Art Gallery has masonry pillars and detailed masonry elements on the exterior and within the interior. The aesthetic design of the building has evolved over a 200-year life cycle to produce a unified structure. Important architectural examples are the top-lit galleries in the north and south wings, which are one of the earliest examples of their type. The galleries were built in a Renaissance style; the architects, Travis & Mangnall, "were key local exponents of a gracious Italianate style which had already from the 1840s become a characteristic of commercial architecture, especially in Manchester".

The building is in the heart of the University of Salford, surrounded by civic and educational buildings. It plays a significant role for its relationship with the Peel building to the west and Peel Park to the north. The building is the earliest civic building in the Crescent area and has influenced the location of the other civic buildings.

== Collections ==
Among the paintings in the Salford collection are works by artists such as Christian Ludwig Bokelmann, Charles Landseer, Arthur Perigal, Philip Hermogenes Calderon, William Bruce Ellis Ranken and Thomas Henry Illidge.

The Salford art gallery formerly held over 400 artworks by the Salford-born painter L. S. Lowry which had been collected since 1930, but these were transferred to The Lowry, a new purpose-built gallery which opened in Salford Quays in 2000.

Selected works on display

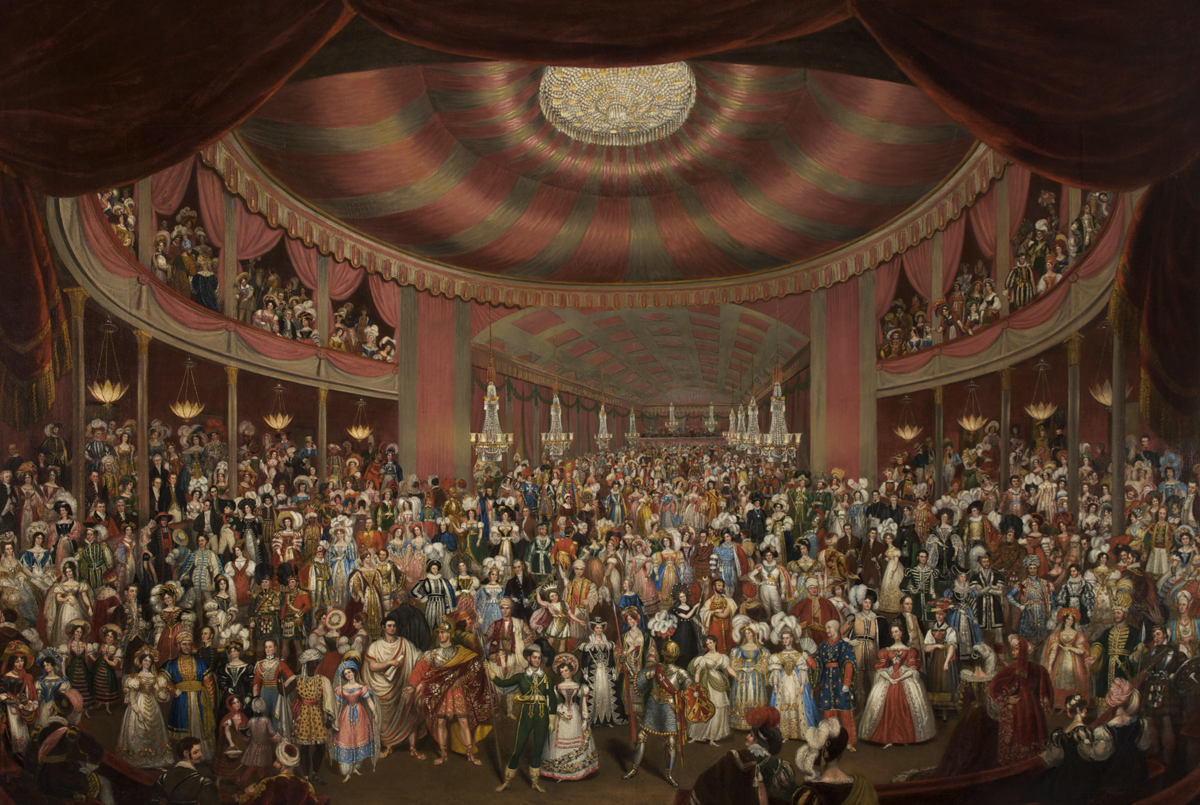
A Fancy Dress Ball, Manchester by Arthur Perigal, 1828

In the Meadows of Fordwich by Thomas Sidney Cooper, 1840

Queen Victoria and Prince Albert in Peel Park by George Hayes, 1851

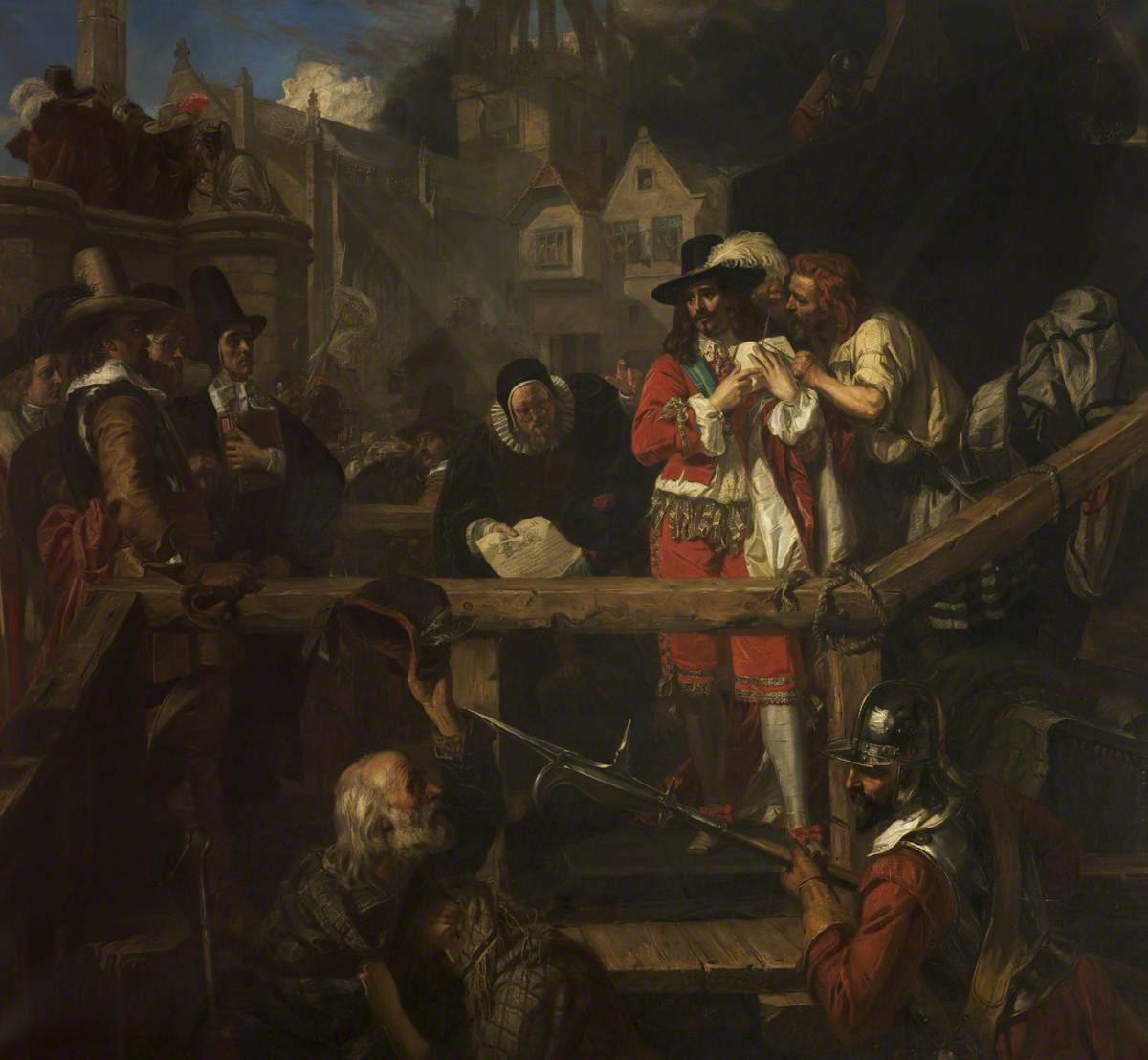
The Execution of the Marquis of Montrose by Edward Matthew Ward, 1853

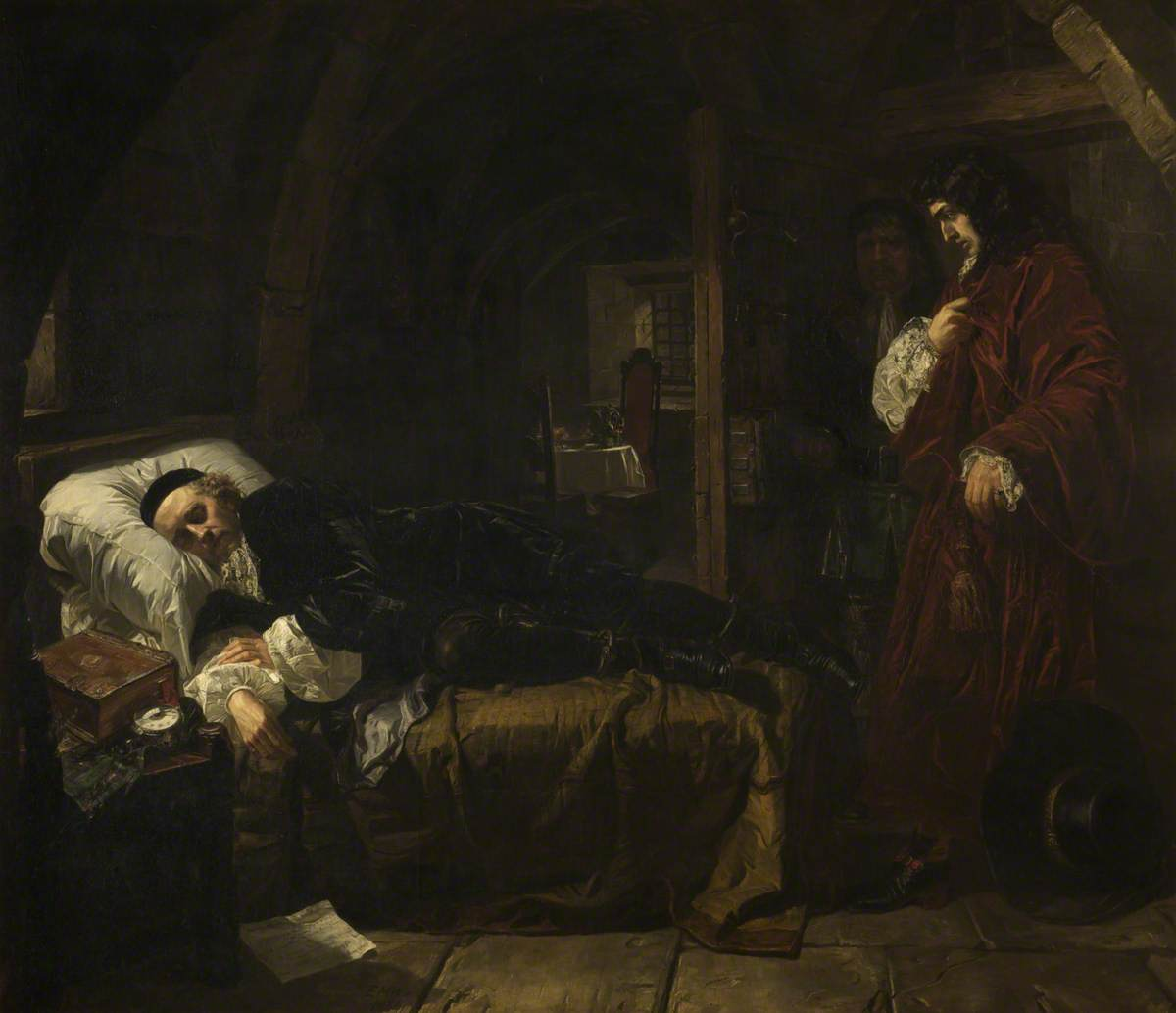
The Last Sleep of the Earl of Argyll by Edward Matthew Ward, 1854

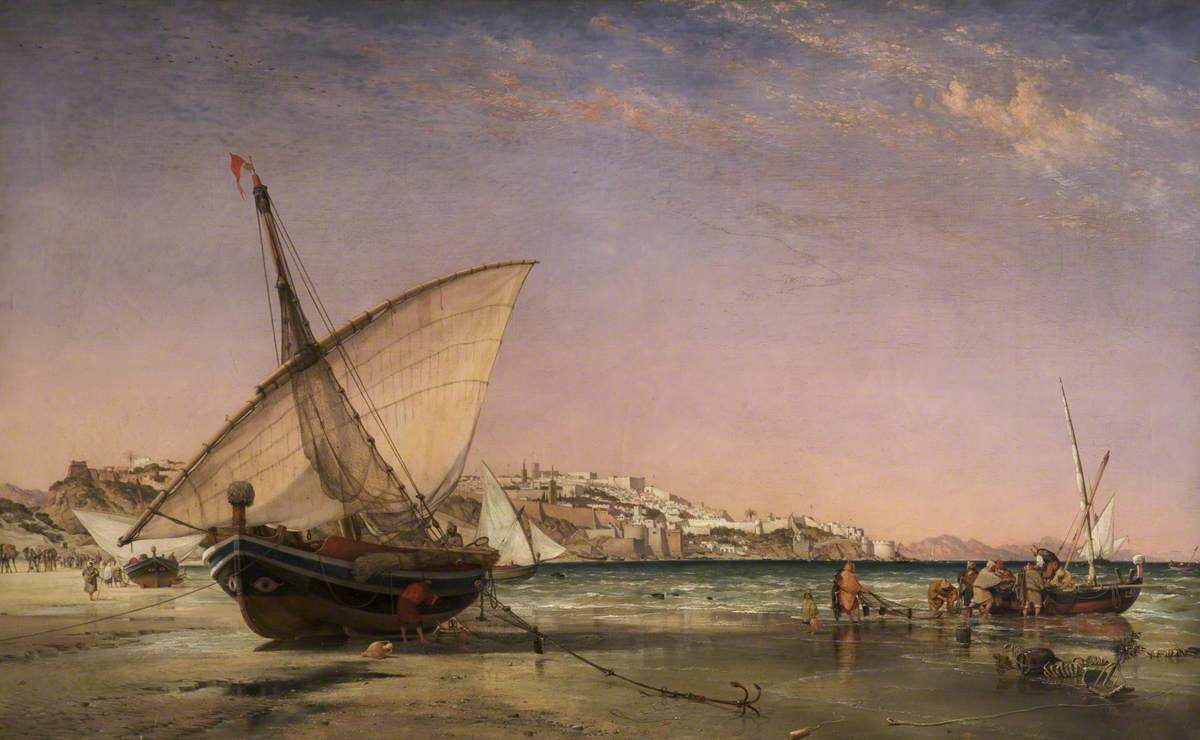
The Bay of Tangier by Edward William Cooke, 1862

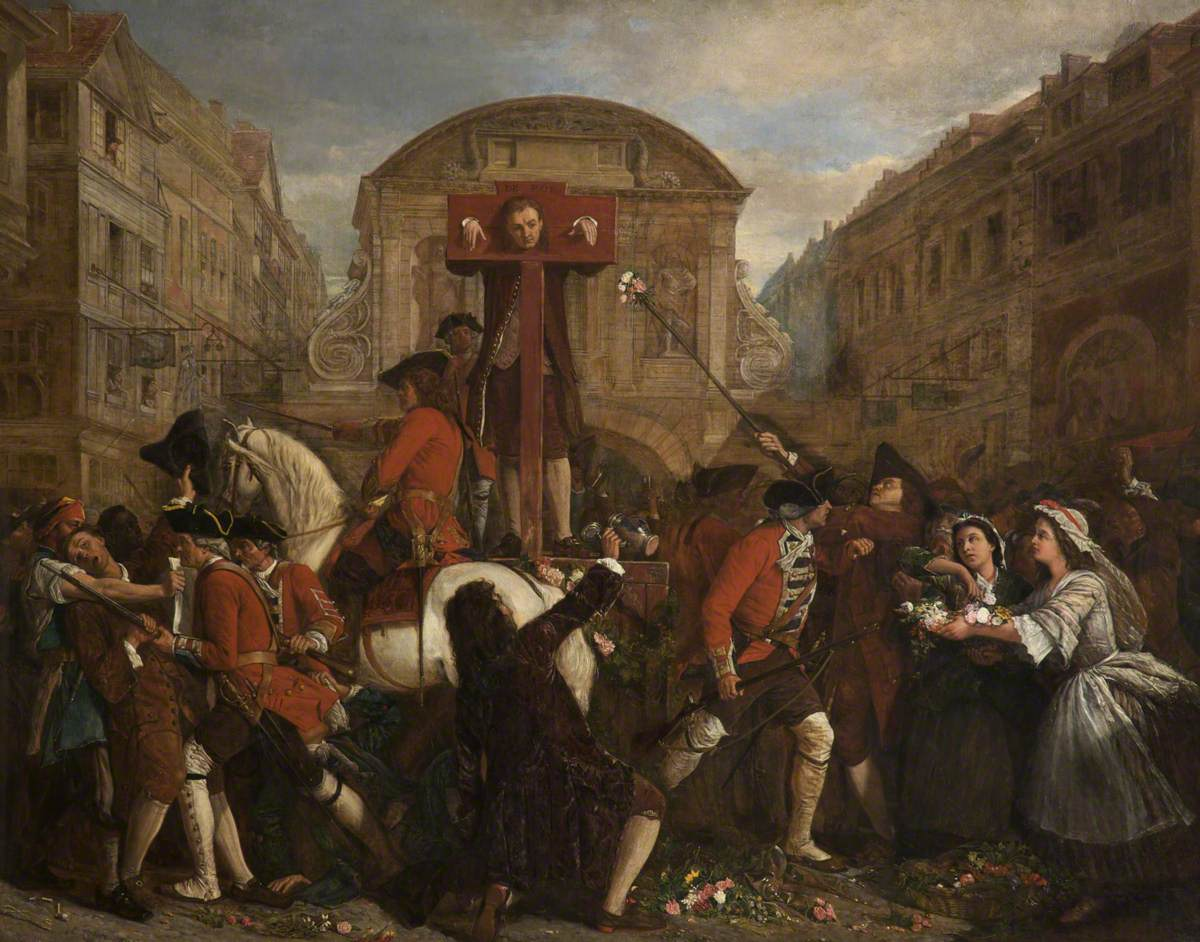
Daniel Defoe in the Pillory by Eyre Crowe, 1862

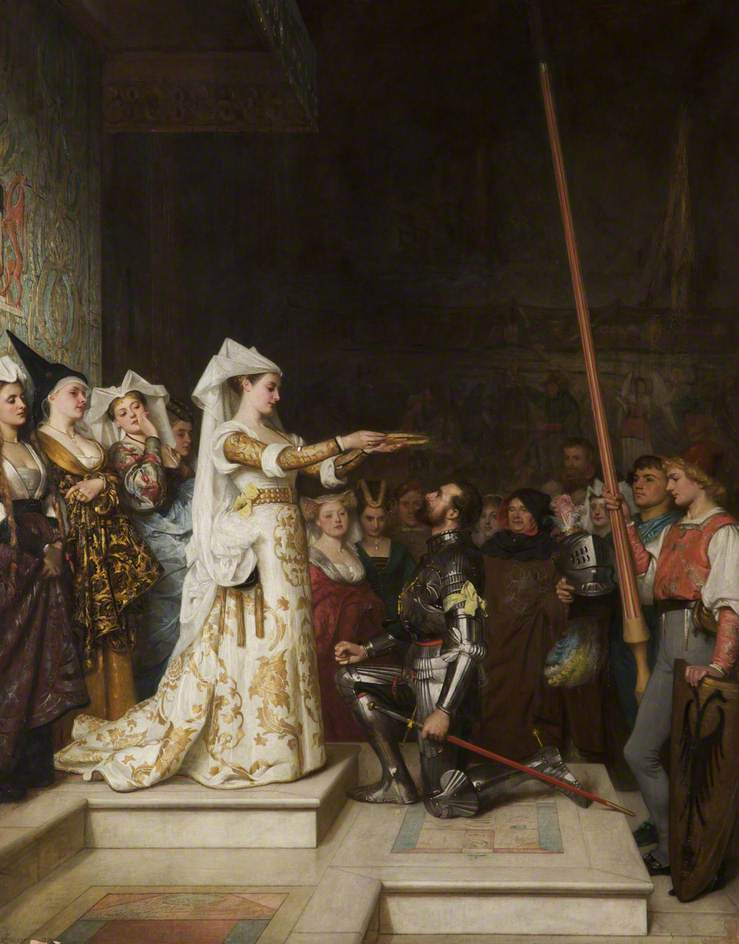
The Queen of the Tournament by Philip Hermogenes Calderon, 1874

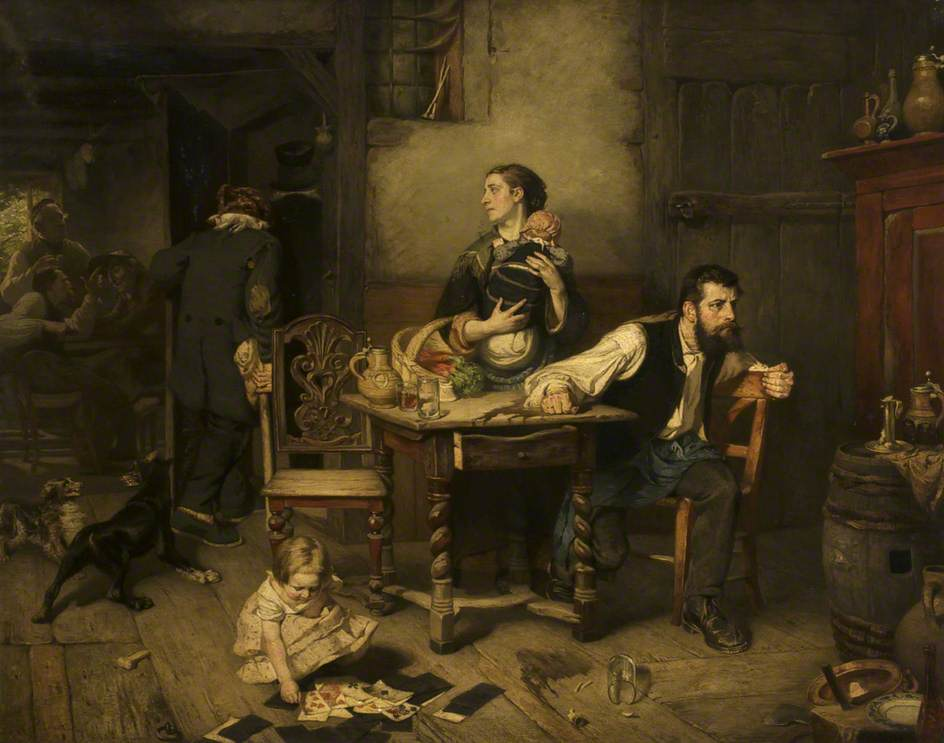
Bokelmann: The Gambler

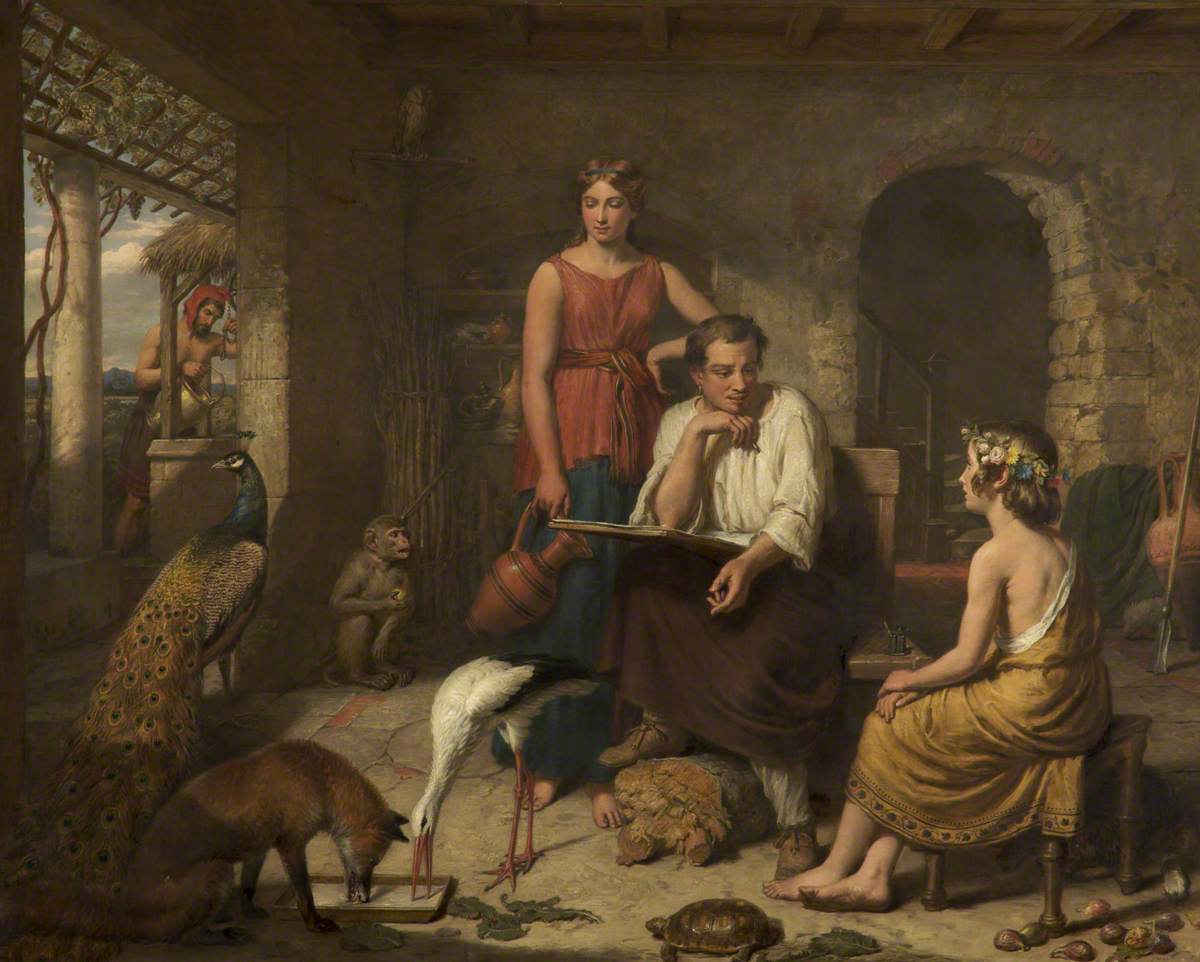
Aesop Composing His Fables by Charles Landseer

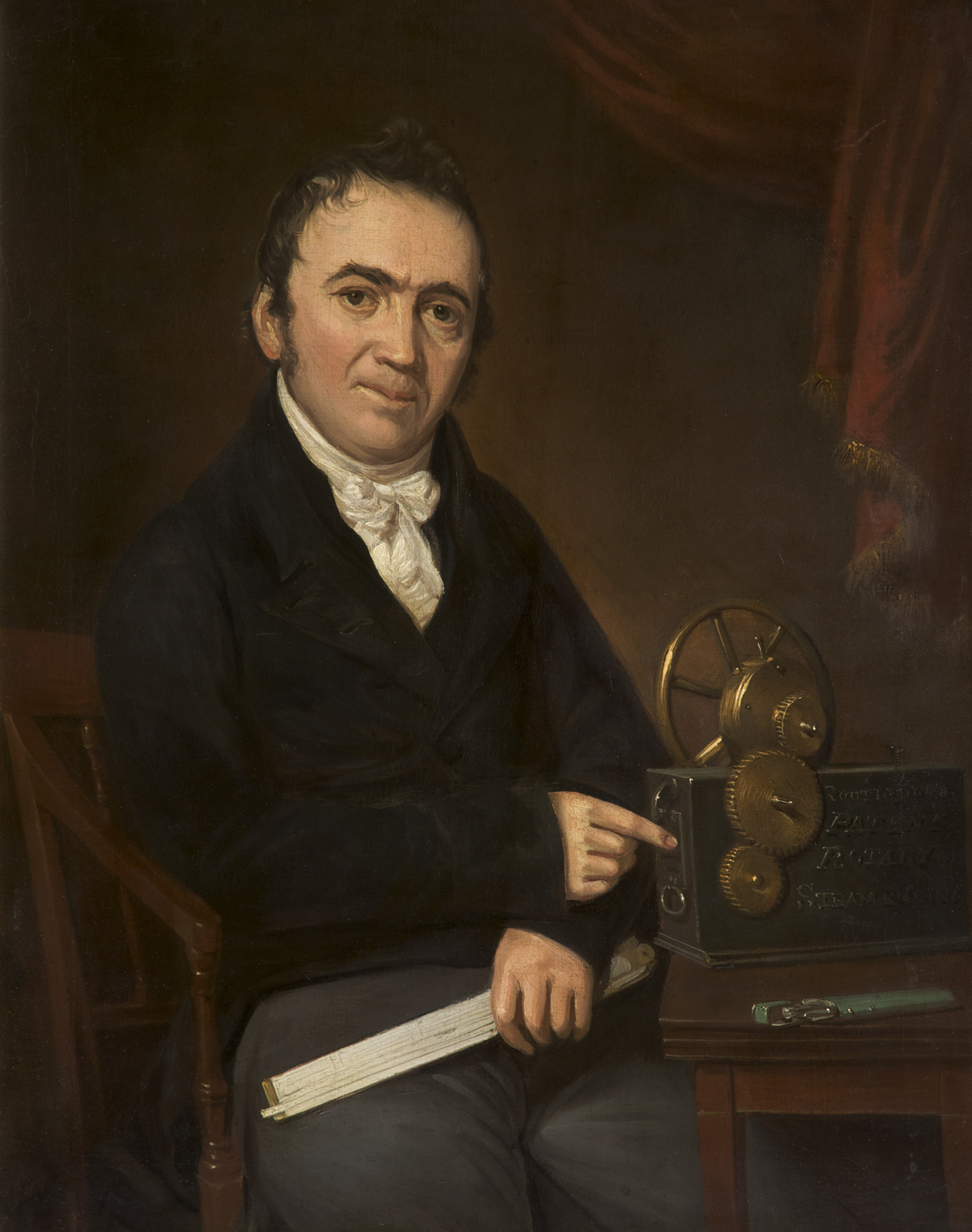
Portrait of Joshua Routledge

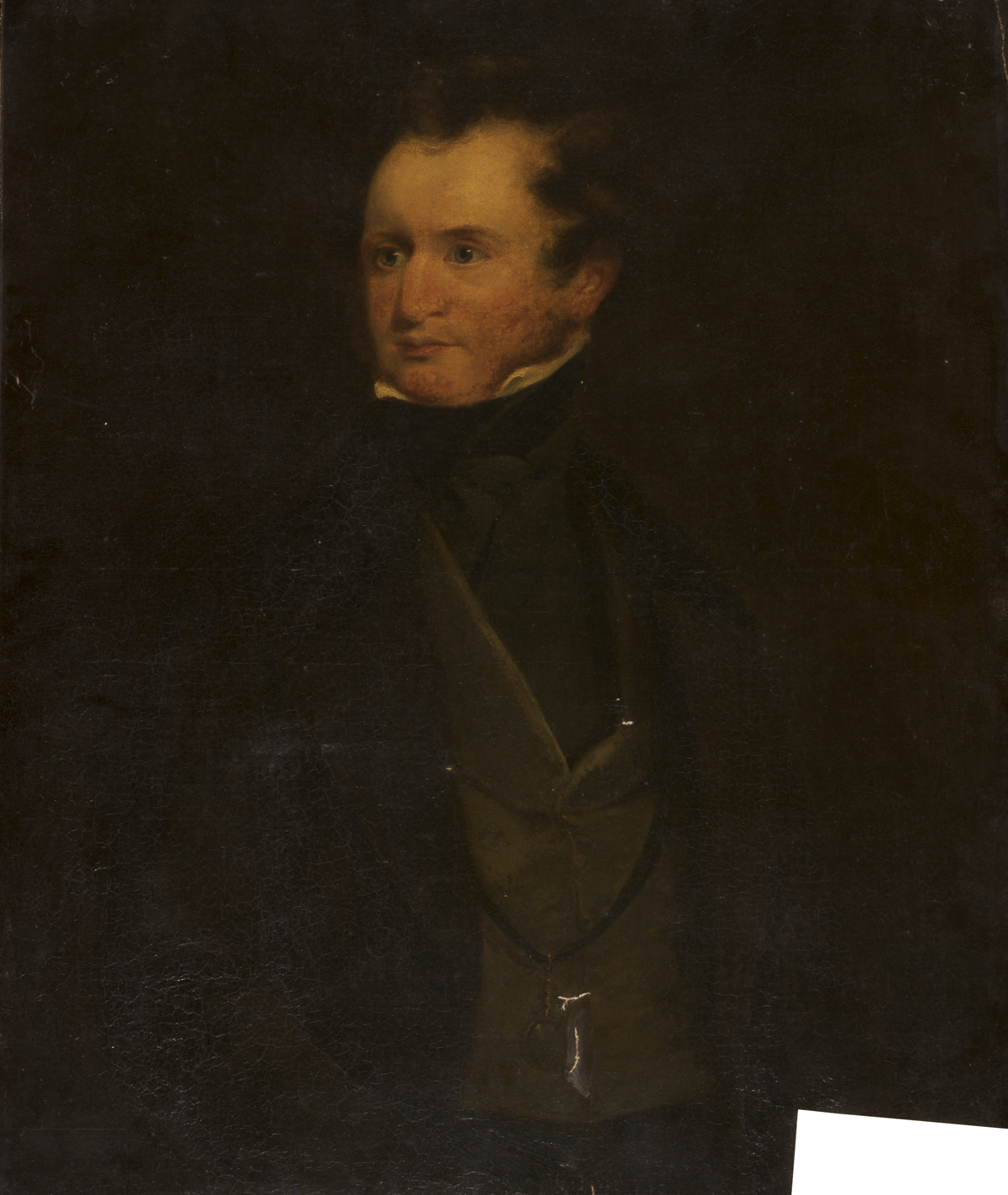
Illidge: portrait of Lord Stanley

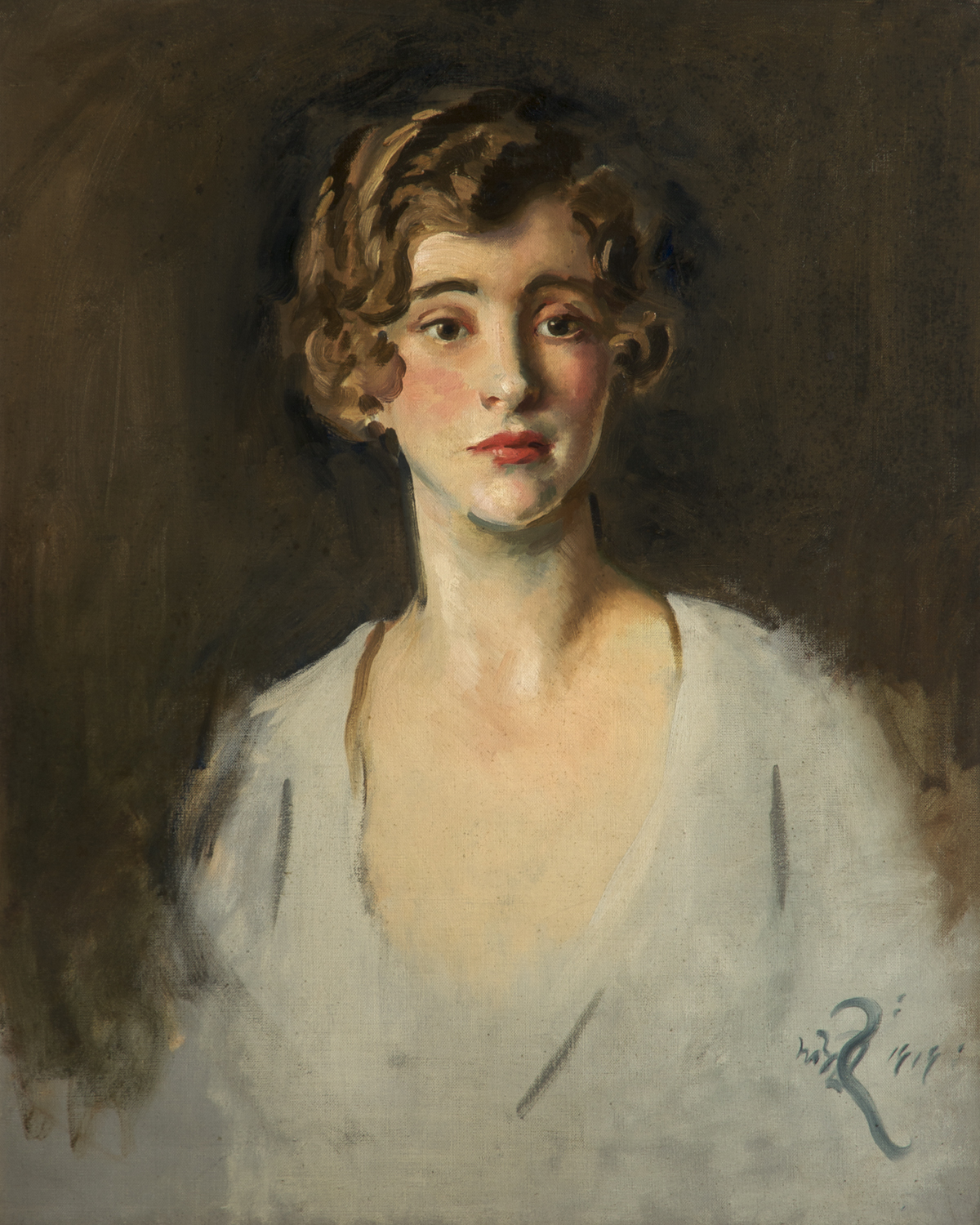
Ranken: Head of a Young Woman

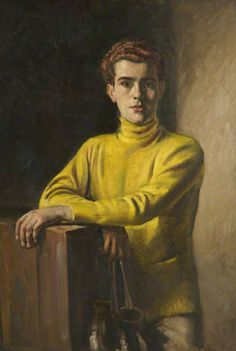
Ranken: Portrait of an amateur boxer

== Lark Hill Place ==
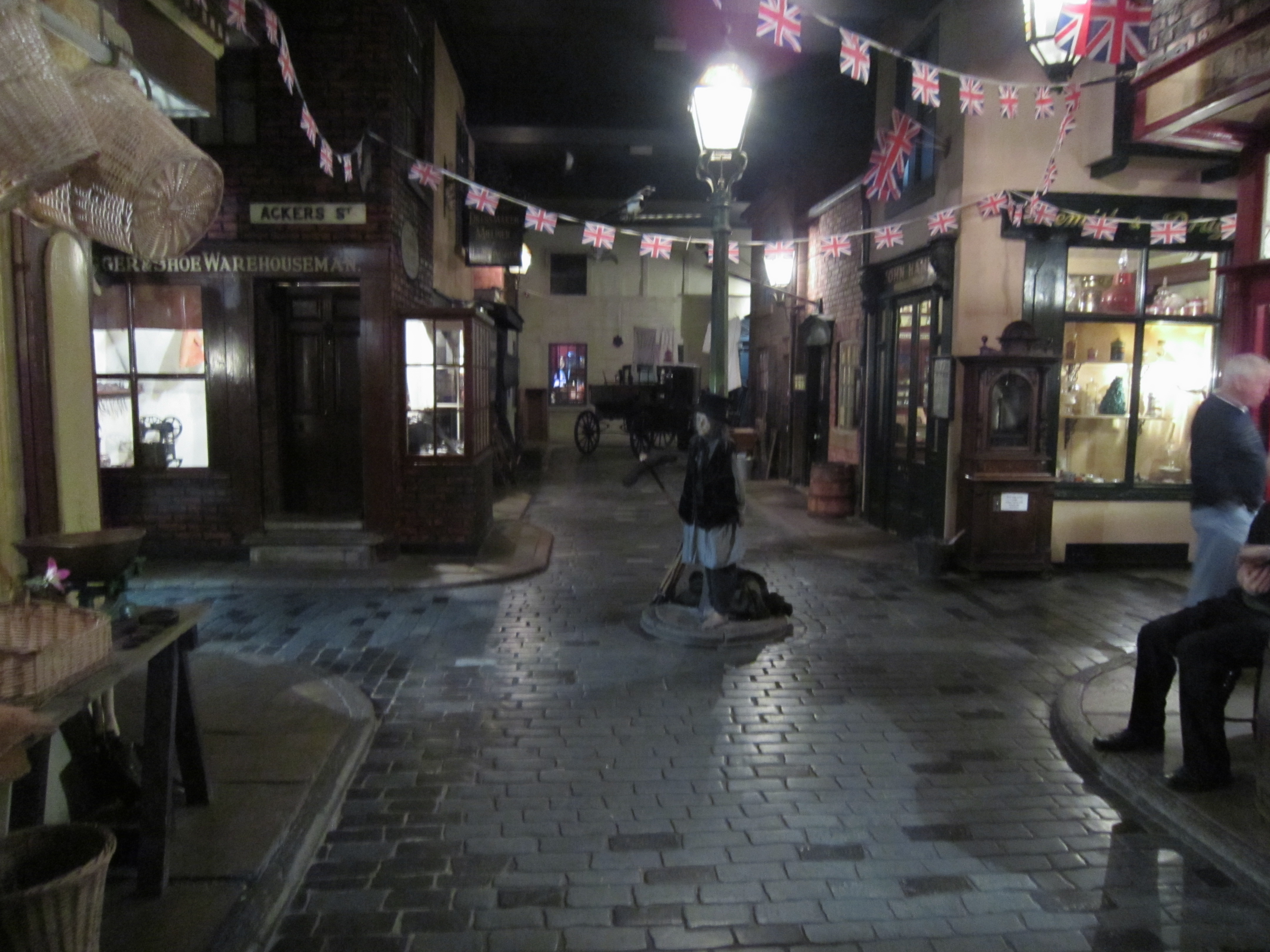
Lark Hill Place, a re-creation of a Victorian street inside Salford Museum

Lark Hill Place, an exhibit on the ground floor, is a re-creation of a typical Victorian street, built using shop fronts that were saved and restored in 1957 when many shops and houses in central Salford were being demolished to make way for new developments. The interiors are furnished with period objects and furniture, recreating the way they were used in Victorian times and recorded sounds are used to produce the ambience of a winter's evening of the period. The conservation of Lark Hill Place, which was done at a time before conservation of historic buildings was popular, represents an early attempt to preserve architectural features during a period of rapid urban development.

== See also ==
- Listed buildings in Salford, Greater Manchester
