= Pillory =

Restraint used to hold and punish a person in a standing position

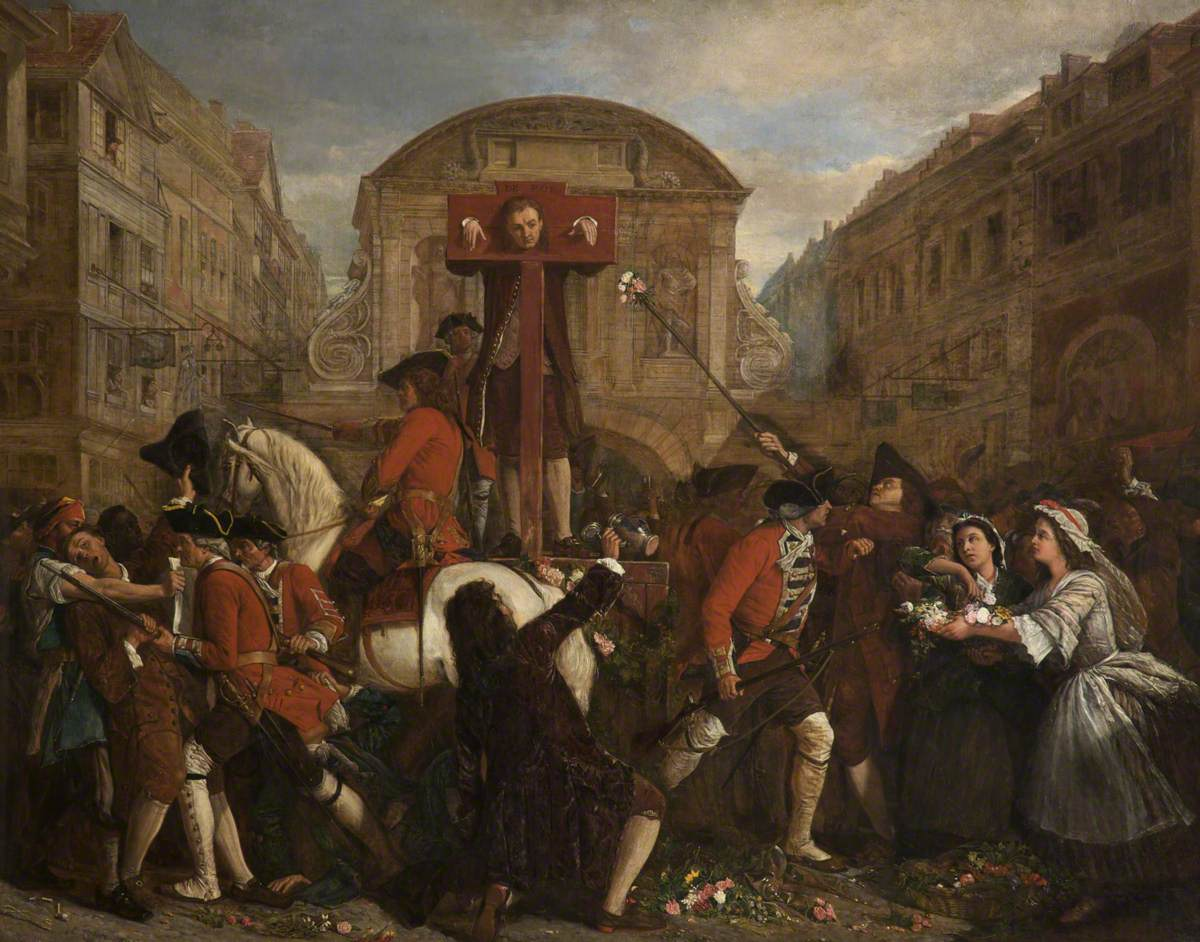
Daniel Defoe in the Pillory (Eyre Crowe, 1862)

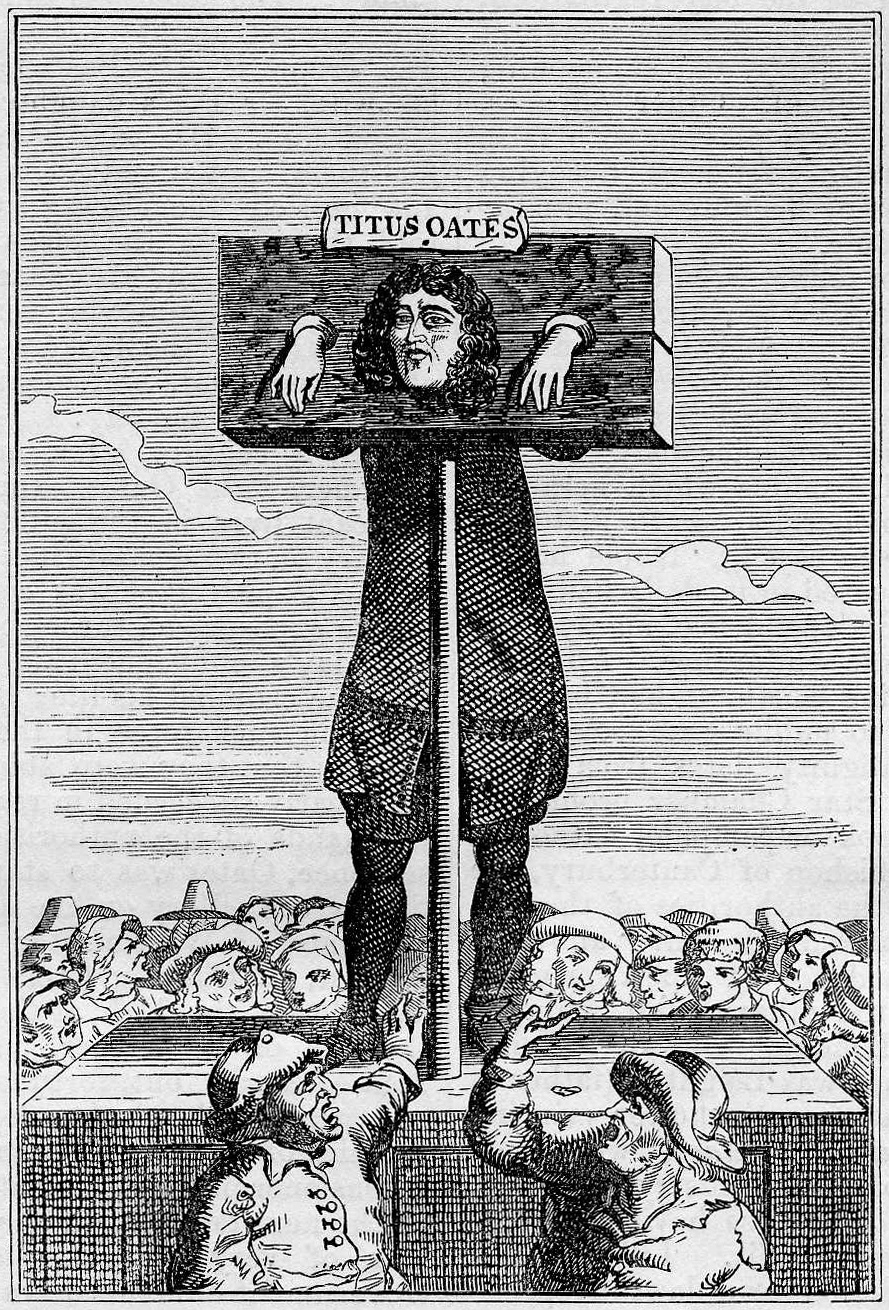
The 17th-century perjurer Titus Oates in a pillory

The pillory is a device made of a wooden or metal framework erected on a post, with holes for securing the head and hands, used during the medieval and renaissance periods for punishment by public humiliation and often further physical abuse. The pillory is related to the stocks.

== Etymology ==
The word is documented in English since 1274 (attested in Anglo-Latin from c. 1189), and stems from Old French pellori (1168; modern French pilori, see below), itself from medieval Latin pilloria, of uncertain origin, perhaps a diminutive of Latin pila 'pillar, stone barrier'.

== Description ==
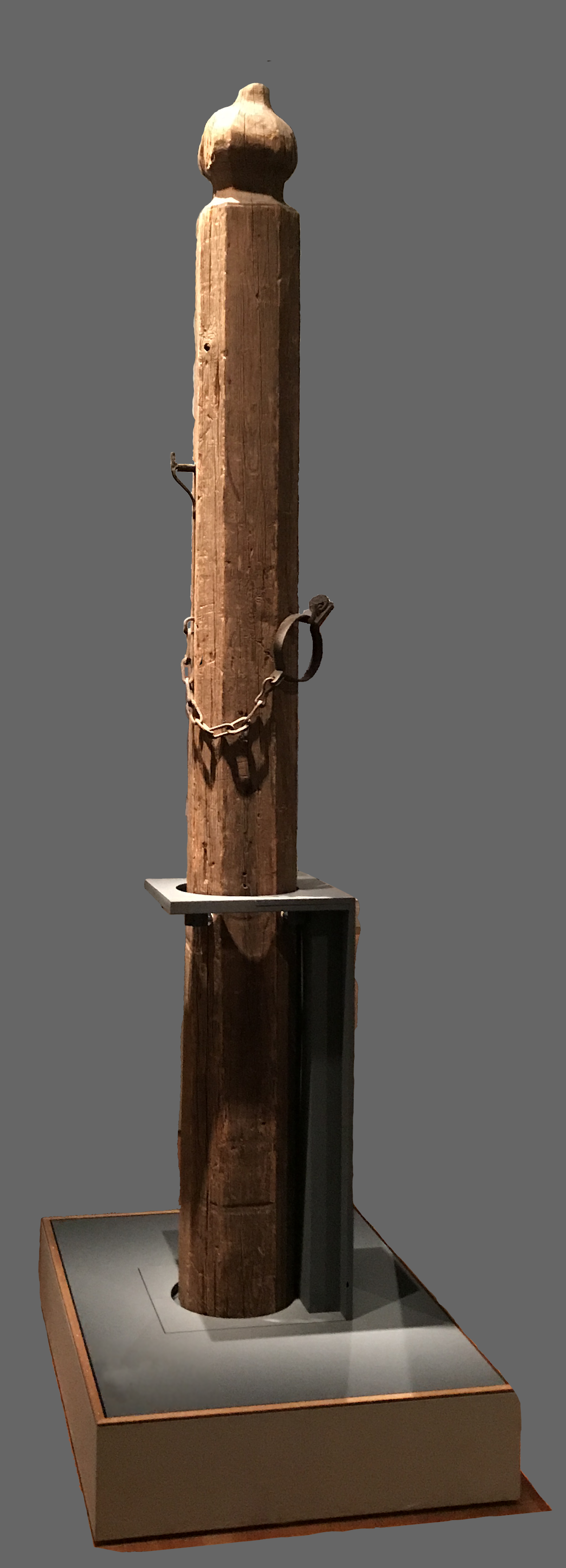
Pillory from Dalarna Region, Sweden (Nordic Museum, Stockholm)

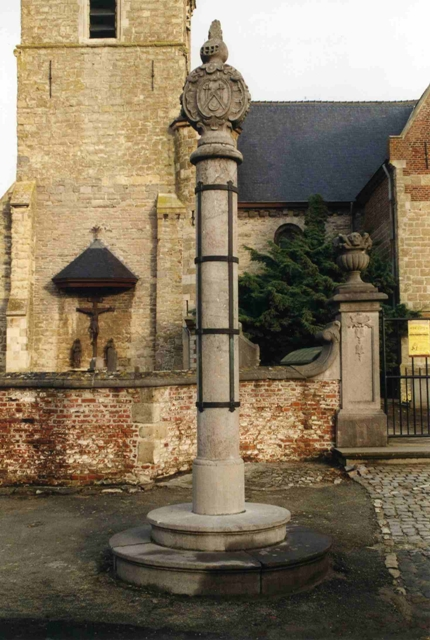
Stone pillory from the 18th century preserved in situ in Mespelare, Belgium. It is decorated with the coat of arms of the Goubau family, who at the time were the lords of the village.

Rather like the lesser punishment called the stocks, the pillory consisted of hinged wooden boards forming holes through which the head or various limbs were inserted; then the boards were locked together to secure the captive. Pillories were set up to hold people in marketplaces, crossroads, and other public places. They were often placed on platforms to increase public visibility of the person; often a placard detailing the crime was placed nearby.

In being forced to bend forward and stick their head and hands out in front of them, offenders in the pillory would have been extremely uncomfortable during their punishment. However, the main purpose in putting criminals in the pillory was to humiliate them publicly. On discovering that the pillory was occupied, people would excitedly gather in the marketplace to taunt, tease and laugh at the offender on display.

Those who gathered to watch the punishment typically wanted (and were even encouraged) to make the offender's experience as unpleasant as possible. In addition to being jeered and mocked, the criminal might be pelted with rotten food, mud, offal, dead animals, and animal excrement. Sometimes people were killed or maimed in the pillory because crowds could get too violent and pelt the offender with stones, bricks and other dangerous objects. However, when Daniel Defoe was sentenced to the pillory in 1703 for seditious libel, he was regarded as a hero by the crowd and was pelted with flowers.

The criminal could also be sentenced to further punishments while in the pillory: humiliation by shaving off some or all hair or regular corporal punishment(s), notably flagellation or even permanent mutilation such as branding or having an ear cut off (cropping), as in the case of John Bastwick.

In Protestant cultures (such as in the Scandinavian countries), the pillory would be the worldly part of a church punishment. The delinquent would therefore first serve the ecclesiastical part of his punishment on the pillory bench in the church itself, and then be handed to the worldly authorities to be bound to the Skampåle (literally: "Shame Pole") for public humiliation.

== Uses ==
Use of the pillory was restricted in England by the Pillory Abolition Act 1816 (56 Geo. 3. c. 138) to punishment for perjury or subornation. The pillory as penalty was abolished in England and Wales by the Pillory Abolition Act 1837 (7 Will. 4 & 1 Vict. c. 23), after Lord John Russell had said "I shall likewise propose to bring in a Bill to abolish the punishment of the pillory—a punishment which is never inflicted." However, the stocks remained in use, though extremely infrequently, until 1872. (Note: The stocks were never formally abandoned in England and Wales, but simply dropped out of use. The last person to be put in the stocks was Mark Tuck, for drunkenness.) The last person to be pilloried in England was Peter James Bossy, who was convicted of "wilful and corrupt perjury" at the Old Bailey Oyer and Terminer in 1830. He was sentenced to seven years penal transportation to Van Diemen's Land, six months in prison at Newgate and one hour in the pillory in the Old Bailey.

In France, time in the "pilori" was usually limited to two hours. It was replaced in 1789 by "exposition", and abolished in 1832. Two types of devices were used:

- The poteau (literally: "post" or "pole") was a simple post, often with a board around only the neck, and was synonymous with the mode of punishment. This was the same as the schandpaal ("shamepole") in Dutch. The carcan, an iron ring around the neck to tie a prisoner to such a post, was the name of a similar punishment that was abolished in 1832. A criminal convicted to serve time in a prison or galleys would, prior to his incarceration, be attached for two to six hours (depending on whether he was convicted to prison or the galleys) to the carcan, with his name, crime and sentence written on a board over his head.
- A permanent small tower, the upper floor of which had a ring made of wood or iron with holes for the victim's head and arms, which was often on a turntable to expose the condemned to all parts of the crowd.

Like other permanent apparatus for physical punishment, the pillory was often placed prominently and constructed more elaborately than necessary. It served as a symbol of the power of the judicial authorities, and its continual presence was seen as a deterrent, like permanent gallows for authorities endowed with high justice.

The pillory was also in common use in other western countries and colonies, and similar devices were used in other, non-Western cultures. According to one source, the pillory was abolished as a form of punishment in the United States in 1839, but this cannot be entirely true because it was clearly in use in Delaware as recently as 1901. Governor Preston Lea finally signed a bill to abolish the pillory in Delaware in March 1905.

Punishment by whipping-post remained on the books in Delaware until 1972, when it became the last state to abolish it. Delaware was the last state to sentence someone to whipping in 1963; however, the sentence was commuted. The last whipping in Delaware was in 1952.

In Portugal today pillory has a different meaning. The Portuguese word is Pelourinho, which translates as 'whipping post'. These monuments were of great importance to the Portuguese, in a tradition dating back to Roman times, when criminals were chained to them. They are stone columns with carved capitals, and they are usually located on the main square of the town, and/or in front of a major church or palace, or town hall. They symbolize local power and authority and were used for posting public notices. Pelourinhos are considered major local monuments, several clearly bearing the coat of arms of a king or queen.

In Brazil (in its former capital, Salvador, the whole old quarter is known as Pelourinho) these structures were tall stone or wooden pillars in central squares and are remembered as sites to which enslaved people were chained and publicly tortured by whipping, as in Portuguese colonies in Africa (e.g. Cape Verde's old capital, Cidade Velha). They were also used for posting notices.

In Spain, the device was called picota or rollo. The insignia on the pillory column marked whose authority ruled the place. The picota was also used to expose the decapitated heads of criminals.

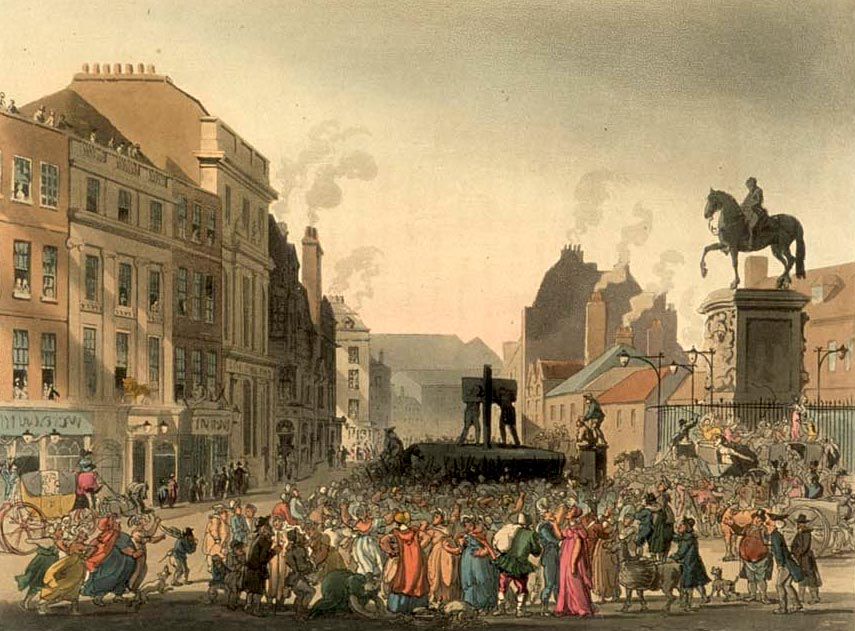
The pillory at Charing Cross in London, c. 1808

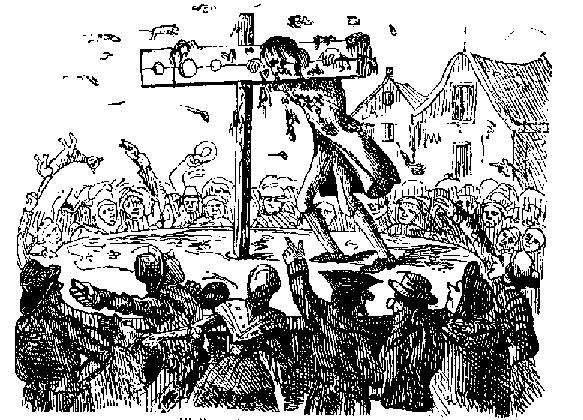
Eighteenth-century illustration of perjurer John Waller, who was killed while being pilloried in London in 1732

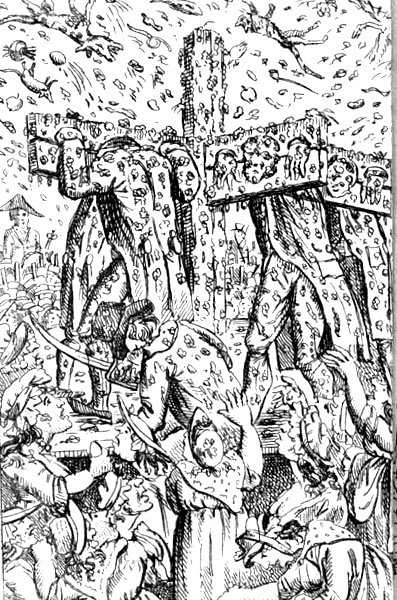
The Vere Street Coterie at the pillory in 1810

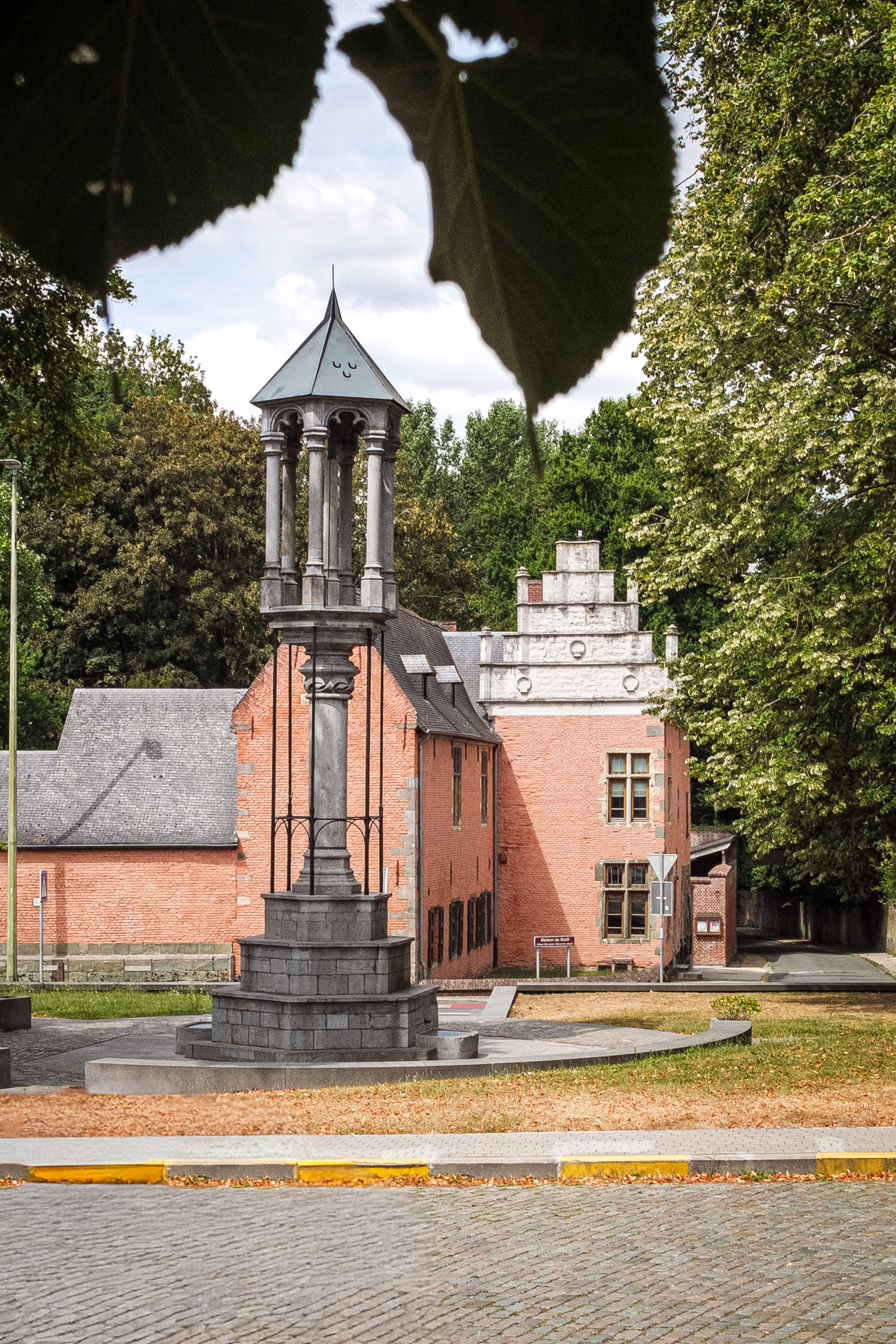
A pillory surmounted by a lantern where the condemned man was tied to a central column, Braine-le-Château, Belgium

== Similar humiliation devices ==
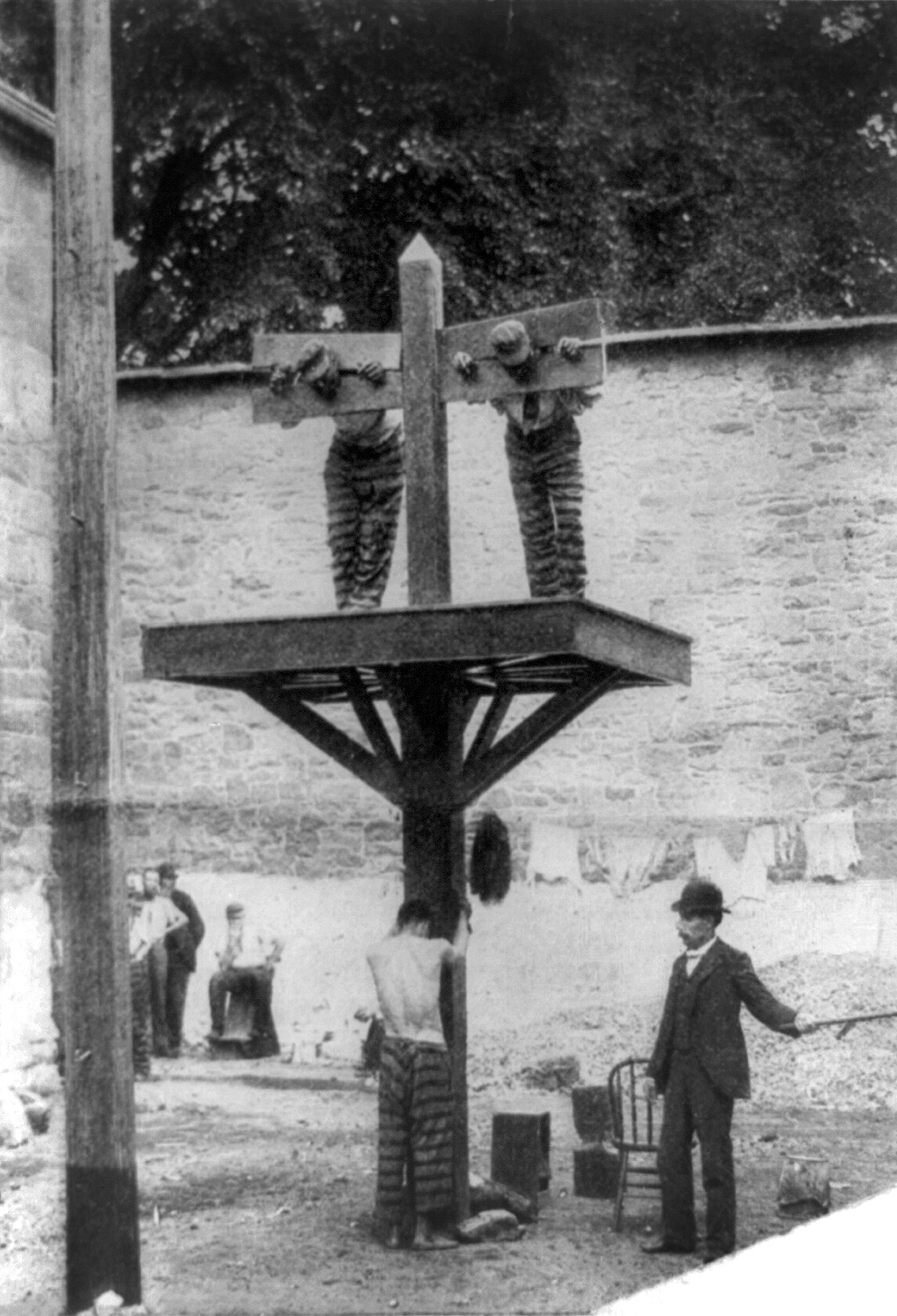
Combined pillory and whipping post in New Castle County Jail, Delaware, 1907. The pillory sits in an elevated position to increase its visibility, while the whipping post is at ground level to provide more room for the whipper.

There was a variant (rather of the stocks type), called a barrel pillory, or Spanish mantle, used to punish drunks, which is reported in England and among its troops. It fitted over the entire body, with the head sticking out from a hole in the top. The criminal is put in either an enclosed barrel, forcing him to kneel in his own filth, or an open barrel, also known as "barrel shirt" or "drunkards collar" after the punishable crime, leaving him to roam about town or military camp and be ridiculed and scorned.

Although a pillory, by its physical nature, could double as a whipping post to tie a criminal down for public flagellation (as used to be the case in many German sentences to staupenschlag), the two as such are separate punishments: the pillory is a sentence to public humiliation, whipping is essentially a painful corporal punishment. The combination of the pillory and the whipping post was one of the various punishments the Puritans of the Massachusetts Bay Colony applied to enforce religious and intellectual conformity on the whole community. Sometimes a single structure was built with separate locations for the two punishments, with a whipping post on the lower level and a pillory above (see image at right).

When permanently present in sight of prisoners, whipping posts were thought to act as a deterrent against bad behaviour, especially when each prisoner had been subjected to a "welcome beating" on arrival, as in 18th-century Waldheim in Saxony (12, 18 or 24 whip lashes on the bare posterior tied to a pole in the castle courtyard, or by birch rod over the "bock", a bench in the corner). Still a different penal use of such constructions is to tie the criminal down, possibly after a beating, to expose him for a long time to the elements, usually without food and drink, even to the point of starvation.

Finger-pillories were at one time in common use as instruments of domestic punishment. Two stout pieces of oak, the top being hinged to the bottom or fixed piece, formed when closed a number of holes sufficiently deep to admit the finger to the second joint, holding the hand imprisoned. A finger-pillory is preserved in the parish church of Ashby-de-la-Zouch, Leicestershire.

== Notable cases ==
- Peter Annet
- Thomas Cochrane, 10th Earl of Dundonald
- Daniel Defoe
- James Nayler
- Elizabeth Needham
- Titus Oates

== Legacy ==
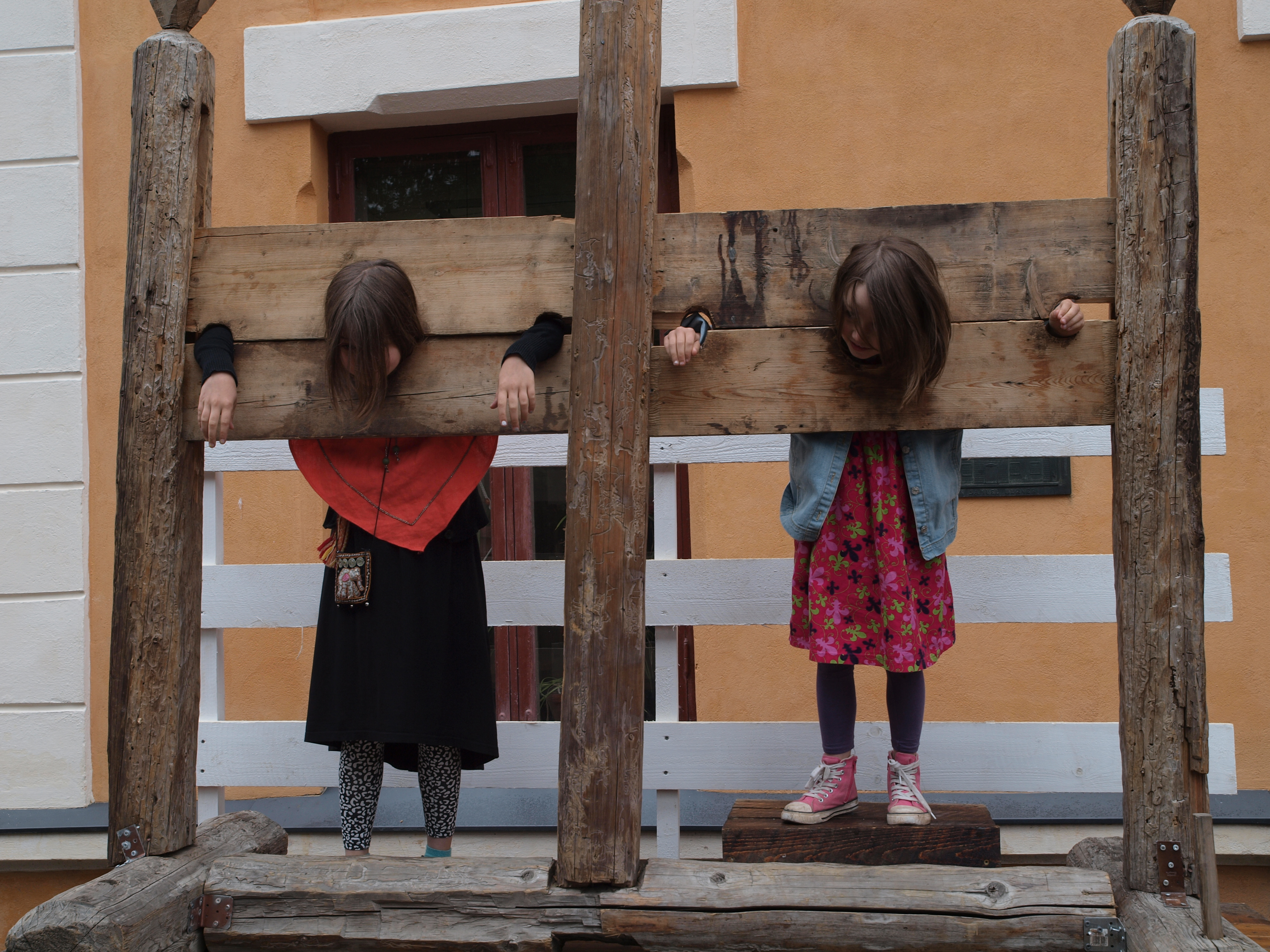
A pillory at the Medieval Market in Turku, Finland

While the pillory has left common use, the image remains preserved in the figurative use, which has become the dominant one, of the verb "to pillory" (attested in English since 1699), meaning "to expose to public ridicule, scorn and abuse", or more generally to humiliate before witnesses.

Corresponding expressions exist in other languages, e.g., clouer au pilori "to nail to the pillory" in French, mettere alla gogna in Italian, or poner en la picota in Spanish. In Dutch it is aan de schandpaal nagelen (nailing to the pole of shame) or aan de kaak stellen, placing even greater emphasis on the predominantly humiliating character as the Dutch word for pillory, schandpaal, literally meaning "pole of shame".

== See also ==
- Cangue, board around the head
- Judicial corporal punishment
- Jougs, metal collar
- Patibular fork
- Scold's bridle, metal frame around head, with bit to hold down tongue
- Shrew's fiddle, board around neck and wrists
