= Thomas Bury =

Thomas Bury may refer to:

- Thomas Bury (cricketer) (1831–1918), English cricketer
- Thomas Bury (judge) (1655–1722), English judge and Chief Baron of the Exchequer
- Thomas Talbot Bury (1809–1877), British architect and lithographer

== See also ==
- Thomas Berry (disambiguation)
