= Daniel Defoe in the Pillory =

Painting by Eyre Crowe

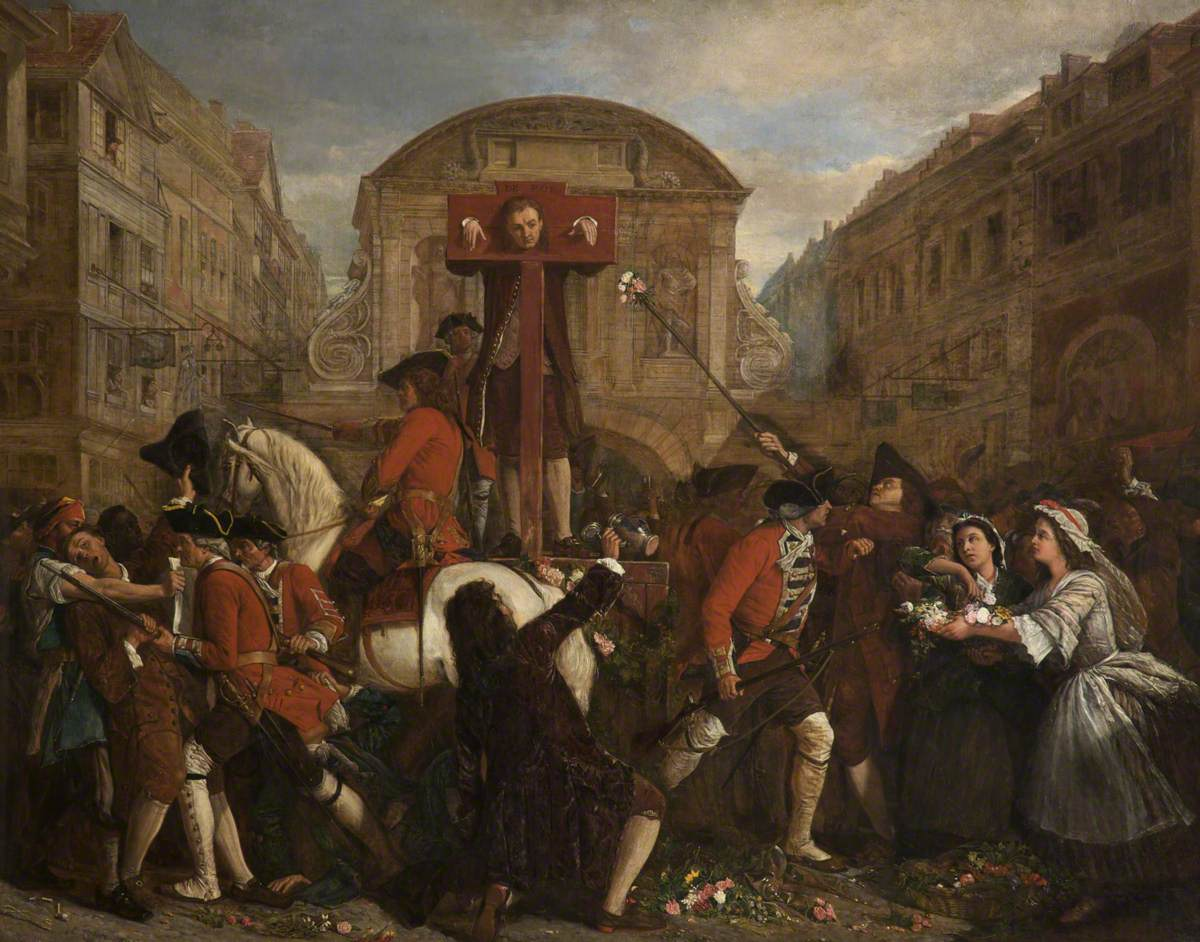
- Artist: Eyre Crowe
- Year: 1862
- Type: Oil on canvas, history painting
- Dimensions: 110 cm × 141 cm (43 in × 56 in)
- Location: Salford Museum and Art Gallery, Greater Manchester

Daniel Defoe in the Pillory is an oil on canvas history painting by the British artist Eyre Crowe, from 1862.

== History and description ==
It depicts a scene from July 1703 during the reign of Queen Anne. The writer Daniel Defoe was punished by being placed in the pillory at Temple Bar for his pamphlet The Shortest Way with the Dissenters in which Defoe, himself a Non-Conformist Christian, launched a satirical attack on the supremacy of the Church of England by exaggeratedly aping the style of the High Tories calling for the hanging of religious dissenters. Redcoated soldiers are shown holding back Defoe's enthusiastic supporters. Ironically, its depiction of Defoe as martyred hero in the defence of freedom were undermined by the publication of letters just a month earlier.

Crowe was a noted artist of the Victorian era. The painting was displayed at the Royal Academy Exhibition of 1862 held at the National Gallery in London. It now forms part of the collection of Salford Museum and Art Gallery having been donated in 1907 by the Alderman Isidor Frankenburg.

== Bibliography ==
- Mueller, Andreas K. E., Mierowsky, Marc & Seager, Nicholas. The Cambridge Edition of the Correspondence of Daniel Defoe. Cambridge University Press, 2022.
- Peterson, Spiro. Daniel Defoe: A Reference Guide, 1731-1924. G.K. Hall, 1987.
