= Thomas Barry =

Thomas, Thom or Tom Barry may refer to:

== Politics ==
- Thomas Barry (English politician) (fl. 1413), MP for Plympton Erle
- Tom Barry (politician) (born 1968), Irish Fine Gael TD for Cork East from 2011
- Thomas E. Barry, American politician, member of the Massachusetts House of Representatives

== Sports ==
- Tom Barry (baseball) (1879–1946), Major League pitcher with the Philadelphia Phillies
- Thomas A. Barry (c. 1879–1947), American football player and coach
- Tom Barry (rugby league, born 1901) (1901–?), Australian rugby league footballer
- Tom Barry (rugby league, born 1899) (1899–1959), Australian rugby league footballer
- Tom Barry (Cork hurler) (1903–1984), Irish hurler
- Tom Barry (London hurler) (1879–1969), Irish sportsman and revolutionary figure
- Thomas J. Barry (1907–1987), American horse trainer

== Others ==
- Thomas Barry (actor) (1743–1768), Irish stage actor and theatre manager
- Thom Barry (active 1995–2016), American actor and disk jockey
- Thomas Barry (clown) (c. 1810–1857), British circus clown
- Thomas Henry Barry (1855–1919), United States Army major general
  - USAT Thomas H. Barry, a Ward Line ocean liner that became a United States Army troopship
- Tom Barry (screenwriter) (1885–1931), American playwright and screenwriter
- Tom Barry (Irish republican) (1897–1980), Irish Republican Army leader

== See also ==
- Thomas Barrie (died 1538), British almoner
- Thomas de Barry (fl. 1560), canon of Glasgow and chief magistrate of Bothwell
