= John Bastwick =

English Puritan physician and writer (1593–1654)

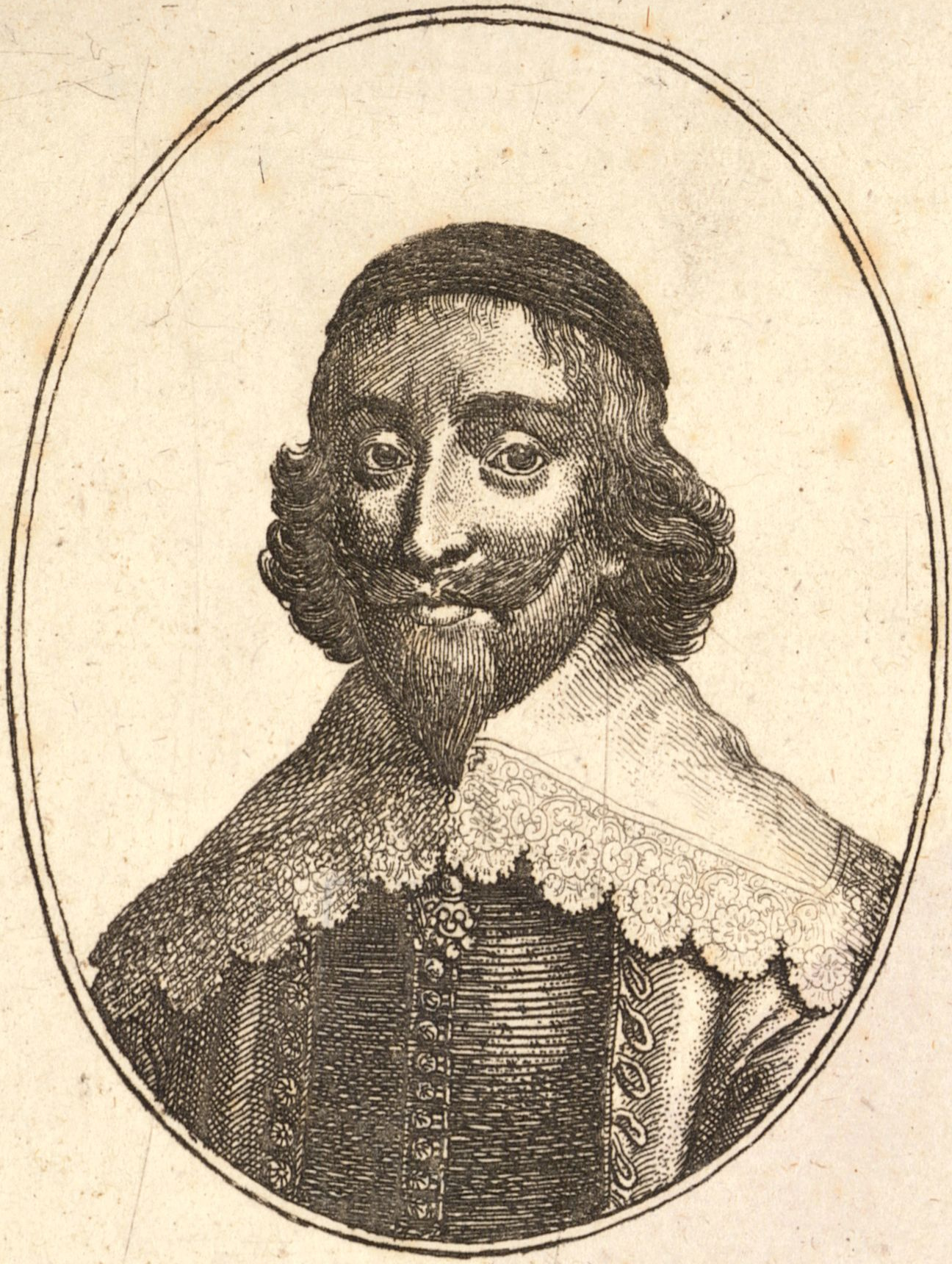
John Bastwick by Wenceslaus Hollar

John Bastwick (1593–1654) was an English Puritan, physician and controversial writer. He was punished for his sedition and this included having his ears removed. He was supported by petitions from his wife Susanna Bastwick.

== Early life ==
Bastwick was born at Writtle, Essex. He entered Emmanuel College, Cambridge, on 19 May 1614, but remained there only a very short time, and left the university without a degree. He travelled and served for a time as a soldier, probably in the Dutch army. He then studied medicine abroad, and took the degree of M.D. at Padua. Back in England in 1623, he settled at Colchester, where he practised as a physician.

== Career ==
Bastwick was a Latin stylist, and began a career as a controversialist with Latin works. In 1634 he published in the Netherlands two anti-Catholic Latin treatises: Elenchus Religionis Papisticae, an answer to a Catholic called Richard Short; and Flagellum Pontificis, an argument in favour of Presbyterianism. The latter came to the notice of William Laud. He had Bastwick brought before the Court of High Commission, where he was convicted of a "scandalous libel", was condemned to pay a fine of £1,000 and costs, and was imprisoned in the Gatehouse Prison adjoining Westminster Abbey until he should recant. In 1636 Bastwick published Πράξεις τῶν επισκόπων, sive Apologeticus ad Praesules Anglicanos, written in the Gatehouse against the high commission court.

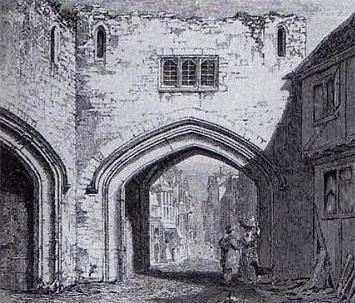
Gatehouse Prison which stood in front of Westminster Abbey, and where Bastwick was incarcerated; since demolished

In 1637 he produced in English the four parts of his Letanie of Dr. John Bastwicke, in which bishops were denounced as the enemies of God and the tail of The Beast. For this publication he was summoned before the Star Chamber. The request for a work in English came from the publisher John Wharton. The Letanie was printed by a Dutch press for John Lilburne, who had been brought to the Gatehouse in 1636 by the clothier Thomas Hewson and minister Edmund Rosier. Lilburne was just finishing an apprenticeship with Hewson, and smuggled the text abroad, but was betrayed by his assistant in importing the Letanie, John Chilliburne, who worked for Wharton. At the time Bastwick was comfortable enough in prison, living with his wife and family and complaining that he ate roast meat only once a week.

Similar proceedings were taken against William Prynne for his Histrio-Mastix, and Henry Burton for "seditious" sermons. Bastwick's voluminous defence, which was also published, aggravated his case. He was found guilty, and along with the others sentenced to lose his ears in the pillory, to pay a fine of £5,000, and to be imprisoned for life. This sentence was carried out with a supportive audience. Bastwick supplied his own scalpel and his wife Susanna kissed his ears before they were removed. After the event she took each ear and placed them by her bosom.

Bastwick was afterwards moved to Star Castle, Isles of Scilly. In November 1640 he was released by order of the Long Parliament, and in December entered London in triumph. Reparation to the amount of the fines imposed was ordered to be made to him (2 March 1641). In 1642, as the First English Civil War broke out, Bastwick was a captain of the Leicester trained bands, and on 22 July he was taken prisoner by the royalists at Leicester, and sent as a prisoner to York.

Soon at liberty again, he published in 1643 a Declaration demonstrating ... that all malignants, whether they be prelates, &c., are enemies to God and the church. The Parliamentary success in the war brought by 1645 a new relationship between the Presbyterians and other Protestant groups, classified as Independents, such as the emerging Quakers and Congregationalists. Bastwick with Prynne was a hard-liner on the Presbyterian side; Burton wanted a less harsh approach, and by then Lilburne was a very popular Independent, beginning to found the Levellers.

Bastwick with Colonel Edward King arranged for Lilburne to be arrested on 19 July 1645 for words he had said against the Speaker of the House of Commons; he was in custody until October. In 1648 Bastwick published two bitter tracts against the Independents, and in defence of himself against Lilburne.

== Death ==
Bastwick died in 1654. Richard Smith, in his "Obituary," gives 6 October 1654 as the date of his burial.

== Private life ==
Bastwick married Susanna Poe and they had five children. Twin girls, Judith and Dionise, were born in 1626, two boys named John in 1633 and 1646 and lastly Susanna born in 1640.

== See also ==
- English Dissenters
