= Cropping (punishment) =

Removal of the ears as corporal punishment

Cropping is the removal of a person's ears as an act of physical punishment. It was performed along with the pillorying or immobilisation in the stocks, and sometimes alongside punishments such as branding or fines. The punishment is described in Victor Hugo's The Hunchback of Notre-Dame.

== Description ==
Cropping sometimes occurred as a standalone punishment (such as in the case of William Prynne for seditious libel), where criminals' ears would be cut off with a blade. Cropping was also a secondary punishment to having criminals' ears nailed to the pillory (with the intention that their body movements would tear them off). In 1538 Thomas Barrie spent a whole day with his ears nailed to the pillory in Newbury, England, before having them cut off to release him.

== History ==
Cropping is mentioned in ancient Assyrian law and the Babylonian Code of Hammurabi.

Cropping was quite rare in England, but more common in Guernsey. Notable cases of cropping in England include Thomas Barrie in 1538, who reputedly died from shock following his cropping, and John Bastwick, William Prynne, and Henry Burton in 1637. In the 16th century, Henry VIII amended the laws on vagrancy to decree that first offences would be punished with three days in the stocks, second offences with cropping, and third offences with hanging.

Records show that croppings took place in the United States in the late 18th century, particularly in states such as Pennsylvania and Tennessee. In the United States this practice, called ear cropping, was one of a number of livestock-management practices—including branding, castration, chaining, and whipping—that were used against the enslaved. Ear cropping, toe removal, and castration were amongst the most extreme measures used to enforce subservience. The intent behind ear-cropping specifically was permanent, visible mutilation, and thus implied ongoing shaming and contempt of the person so mutilated. Evidence that Tennessee slave owners practiced ear-cropping appears first in an issue of the Knoxville Gazette from 1796. As summarized by the editors of American Slavery As It Is: Testimony of a Thousand Witnesses in 1839, slavery entailed a veritable panoply of violence: "The slaves are often branded with hot irons, pursued with fire arms and shot, hunted with dogs and torn by them, shockingly maimed with knives, dirks, &c.; have their ears cut off, their eyes knocked out, their bones dislocated and broken with bludgeons, their fingers and toes cut off, their faces and other parts of their persons disfigured with scars and gashes, besides those made with the lash."

From page 153 of Reverend Samuel Peters' General History of Connecticut, written during the colonial period, there is this account:

Newhaven is celebrated for giving the name of "Pumpkin Heads" to all of New Englanders. It originated from the "Blue Laws" which enjoined every male to have his hair cut round by a cap. When caps are not to be had, they substituted a hard shell of a pumpkin, which being put on the head every Saturday, the hair is cut by the shell all round the head…….. and fourthly, such persons as have lost their ears for heresy, and other wickedness, cannot conceal their misfortune and disgrace.

In Rhode Island, cropping was a punishment for crimes such as counterfeiting money, perjury, and "burning houses, barns, and outbuildings" (but not amounting to arson). Cropping (along with the pillory and stocks) was abolished in Tennessee in 1829, with abolition further afield starting from approximately 1839.

American Notes, a work written by Charles Dickens in 1842, describes the cropping of fleeing slaves' ears being used as identification after capture.

== See also ==
- Cropping (animal)

== Sources ==
- Adams, Robert (1998), The Abuses of Punishment, Basingstoke, Hampshire: Palgrave Macmillan, ISBN 0-312-17617-1
- Corlew, Robert Ewing; Folmsbee, Stanley John; Mitchell, Enoch L (1990), Tennessee: A Short History, Knoxville, TN: University of Tennessee Press, ISBN 0-87049-647-6
- Dearmer, Percy (2009), Religious Pamphlets, Charleston, SC: BiblioBazaar, ISBN 978-1-115-39089-7
- Du Cane, Edmund F. (2005), The Punishment and Prevention of Crime, Whitefish, MT: Kessinger Publishing, ISBN 1-4179-7160-6
- Ford, David Nash (2001), Ghosts from Berkshire Places Beginning with 'N', Finchampstead, Berkshire: Royal Berkshire History
- Hugo, Victor (2009) [1831], The Hunchback of Notre Dame (Notre-Dame de Paris), ISBN 1-4209-3381-7
- Kellaway, Jean (2003), The History of Torture and Execution, ISBN 1-58574-622-3
- Ogier, Darryl Mark (1996), Reformation and Society in Guernsey, Woodbridge, Suffolk: Boydell & Brewer, ISBN 0-85115-603-7
- Prison Discipline Society (1826), Annual Report of the Board of Managers, Boston, MA: Prison Discipline Society
- Stronghold Knights (2010), The Pillory (1100 - 1840 AD)
- Warner, A (2005), History of Allegheny County, Pennsylvania, Westminster, MD: Heritage Books, ISBN 0-7884-4612-6
