= Eyre Crowe (painter) =

English painter and author (1824–1910)

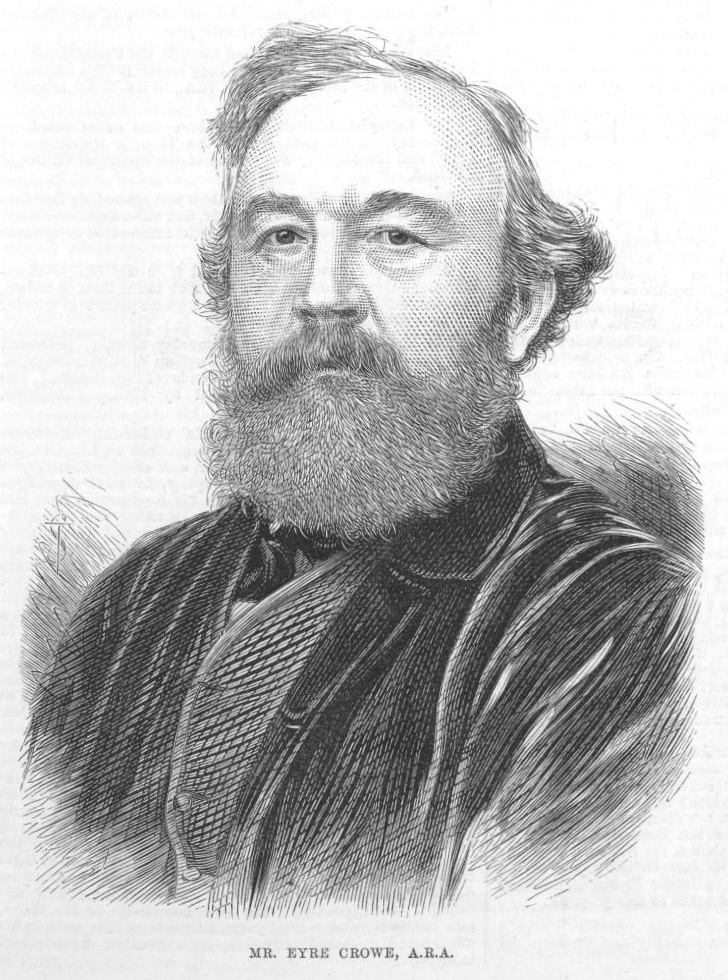
Portrait of Crowe by Thomas Dewell Scott for The Illustrated London News

Eyre Crowe, ARA (3 October 1824 – 12 December 1910) was an English painter and author who specialised in history painting and genre art. His work usually centered around the everyday life's of the poor urban working class during the industrial revolution. He was rather progressive for the time, deviating from the idealistic depictions of urban life popular among the public. Instead he aimed for social realism in his pieces. The 1874 edition of The Art Journal described him as, "[un]afraid of reality, and [un]shrinking from scenes that less robust minds would consider vulgar." He died on 12 December 1910 from heart failure following a hernia operation. He is buried in Kensal Green Cemetery, London.

== Family ==
Crowe's parents were Margaret Archer and Eyre Evans Crowe. He was the eldest of six siblings: Joseph Archer (1825), Eugenie Maria (1827), Edward (1829), Amy (1831) and George (1841). After Crowe’s mother died in 1853, his father married Jane Frances Milne and had 5 more children.

== Life ==
=== Early life ===
Eyre Crowe was born on 3 October 1824 in London. He and his family moved to France in 1826 in search of work opportunities, where his father got a job working for the Morning Chronicle. Through his father’s work, Crowe was introduced to the liberal and artistic circles of both France and expatriates from a young age. In childhood he personally knew William Makepeace Thackeray and the relationship continued long into his adult life.

=== Education ===
Crowe's early education took place at home by his father and private tutors. In 1839, at age 14 he enrolled as a student under Paul Delaroche. In 1843 after the closure of Delaroche's art studio, Crowe traveled with him to Rome with a few of the other pupils. In 1845 he got accepted as a full-time student at the Royal Academy School of Art in 1845.

=== Personal life ===
He was a lifelong friend of Jean-Léon Gérôme, one of the other students who traveled to Rome with Delaroche. Throughout his life, Crowe stayed in contact with and occasionally worked for William Thackeray, who often assisted him financially in his youth. In the late 1850s Crowe was a part of the Hogarth Club and the United Arts Club. In the 1860s Crowe became an honorary member of the Saint John’s Wood artist clique and the Reform Club.

=== Career ===
Crowe had little initial success as an artist in London. In 1846 Crowe had his first success in the British art world: Master Prynne searching Archbishop Laud’s pockets in the Tower which was exhibited in the Royal Academy. He was also exhibited in the Royal Academy in 1848 and 1849.

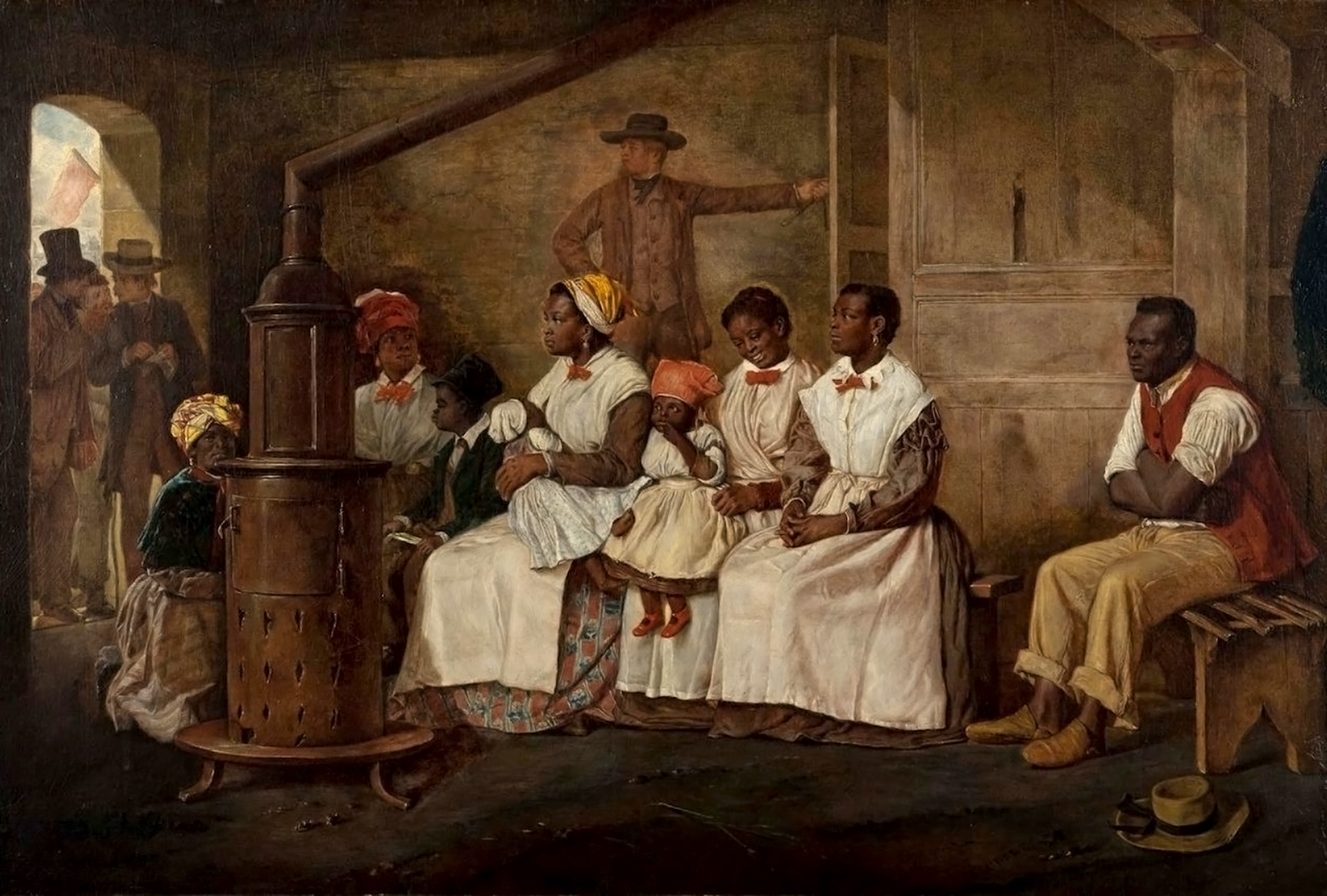
Slaves Waiting for Sale: Richmond, Virginia

In 1851 as his art career failed to take off Crowe turned to writing. He was hired on by his father, who was then the editor of the Daily News, as an art critic. Shortly after, he was formally hired by Thackeray as a secretary and accompanied him on his trip to America in 1852, returning to Europe (Paris) in 1853. He later went on to publish a book about this journey in 1893 called With Thackeray in America.

After returning from America, Crowe was re-inspired to pursue art. His first series of works focused on the conditions of slavery which he had been exposed to in his time in America. By 1855 he had exhibited paintings in the Suffolk Street Gallery, Royal Academy, and two in the Royal Scottish Academy. In 1856 after moving back to London, Crowe's art career finally got off the ground. Starting in 1857 Crowe had at least one of his works exhibited in the Royal Academy for the next 52 years.

From 1859-1900, to supplement his art career Crowe worked part-time as an itinerant inspector of government art schools for the Department of Science and Art at South Kensington Museum (now called the Victoria and Albert Museum).

== Significant works ==
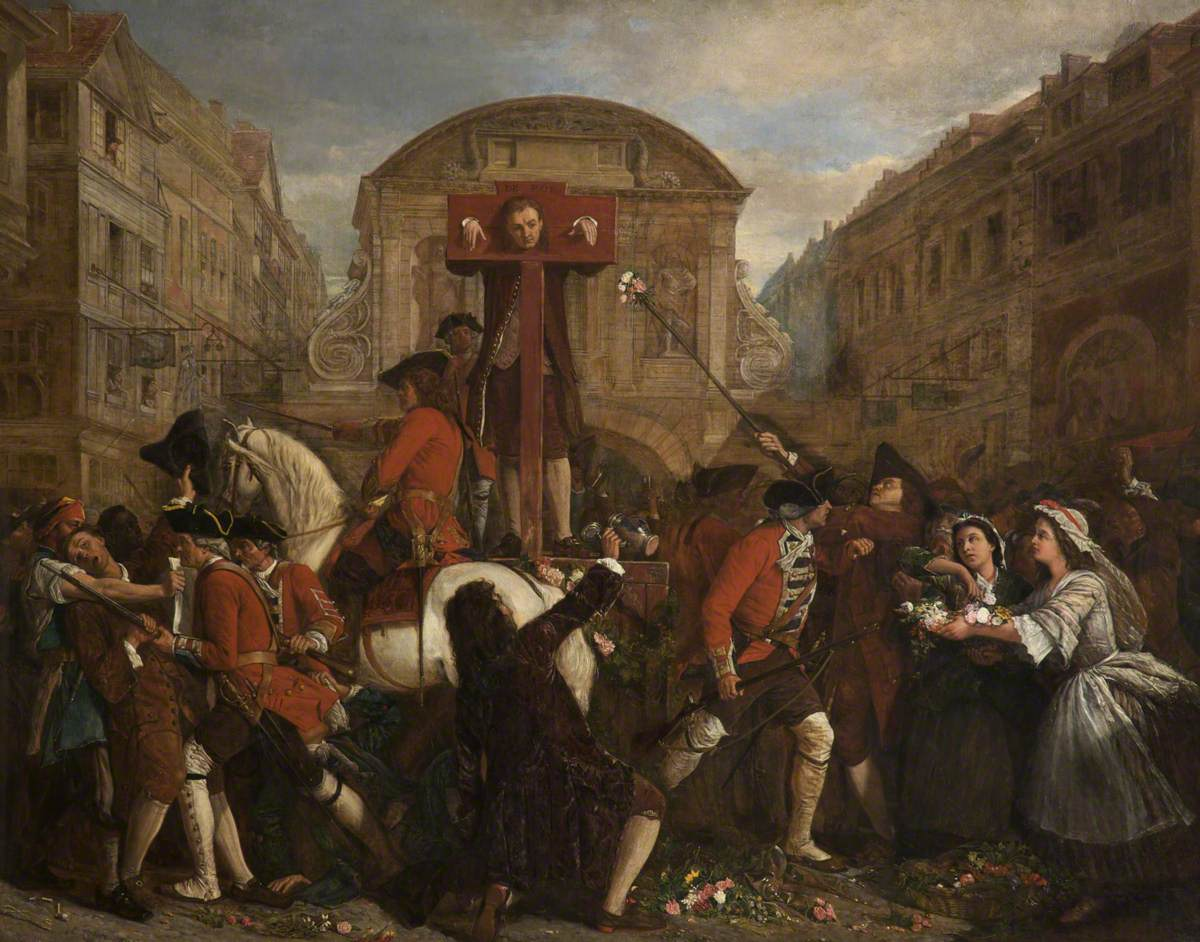
Daniel Defoe in the Pillory, 1862

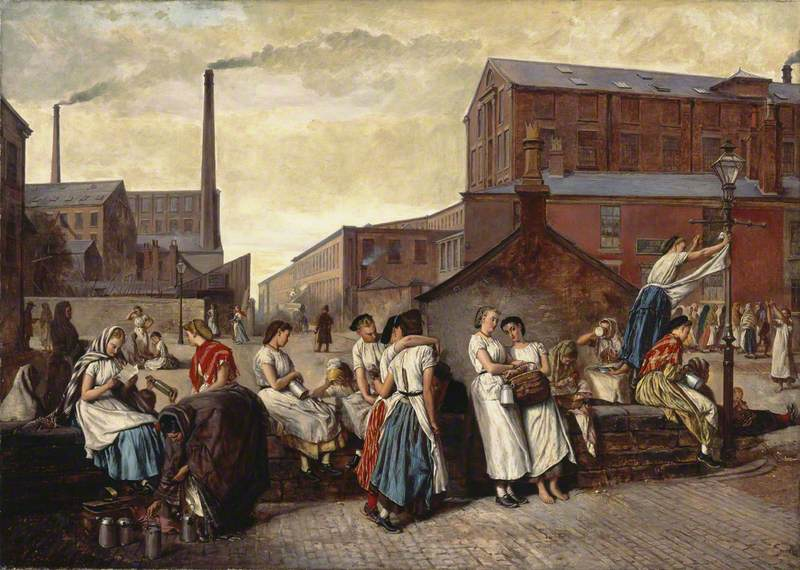
The Dinner Hour, Wigan, 1874. One of Crowe's best known pieces.

"The Dinner Hour, Wigan" 1874 is one of the few of Crowe's paintings to remain a public exhibit. It currently hangs on display in The Manchester Art Gallery. The painting is an oil on canvas depicting the workers of Victoria Mill cotton spinning factory taking their dinner hour. The factory was owned by Thomas Taylor and was part of the Lancashire Textile industry. The painting was not originally well received by the public due to its unusually unromantic depiction of urban life for the time. Critics called it "vulgar" and "unpictoral". However, it is held by many current art historians as one of the more realistic depictions of urban working life of its time.

== Other works ==
- A Slave Sale in Charleston, South Carolina (1854; Museo Nacional de Bellas Artes, Havana, Cuba)
- Slaves Waiting for Sale: Richmond, Virginia (1861; Private collection)
- Daniel Defoe in the Pillory (1862; Salford Museum and Art Gallery)
- Brick Court or Death of Goldsmith (1863)
- Luther Pasting his Theses on the Church Door of Wittenberg (1864)
- Shinglers or The Forge (1869; Grohmann Museum)
- The Penance of Dr Johnson, 1784 (1869)
- The Dinner Hour, Wigan (1874; Manchester Art Gallery)
- A Sheep-Shearing Match (1875)
- Sandwiches (1881)
- Convicts at Work, Portsmouth (1887)
- Nelson Leaving England for the Last Time (1888)
- The Founder of English Astronomy (1891; see Jeremiah Horrocks)
- The Brigs of Ayr (1894)
- The Gipsy's Rest (1897)
- Trial for Bigamy (1897)
- James II at the Battle of La Hogue (1898)
