= Royal Academy Exhibition of 1851 =

1851 art exhibition in London

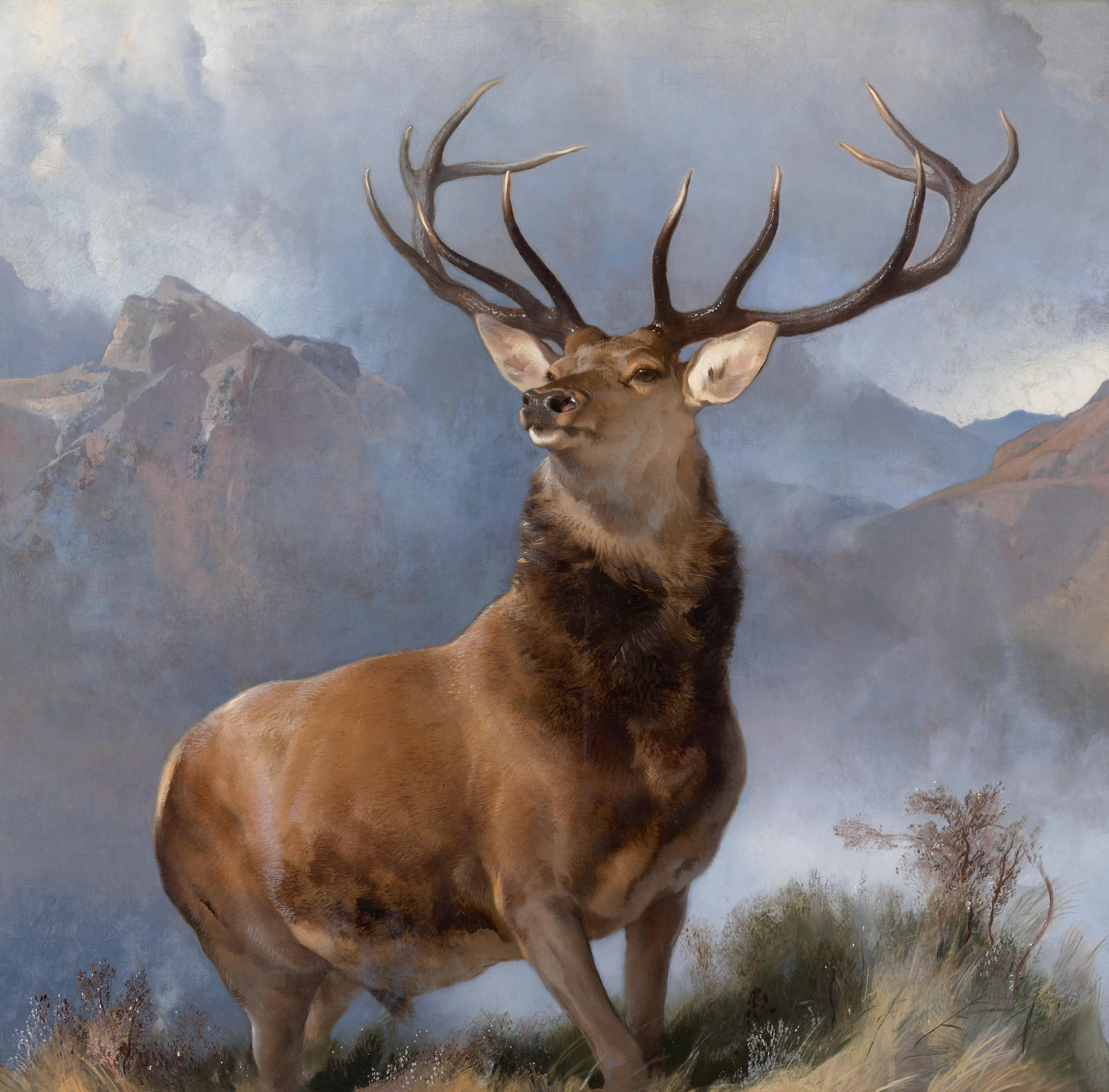
The Monarch of the Glen by Edwin Landseer

The Royal Academy Exhibition of 1851 was the eighty third annual Summer Exhibition of the British Royal Academy. It was held at the National Gallery in London between 5 May and 16 August 1851 during the Victorian era. It faced strong competition in public interest from the Great Exhibition being held in Hyde Park at the same time.

The exhibition marked the high point of critical attacks on the young artists of the Pre-Raphaelite movement, although they were staunchly defended by the art historian John Ruskin. J.M.W. Turner, who had first appeared at the Exhibition of 1790, was too ill to produce any paintings but attended the varnishing day where he was sketched by John Everett Millais. He died in December 1851.

Amongst the several works submitted by Edwin Landseer was The Monarch of the Glen featuring a stag, which became one of the iconic images of the Scottish Highlands Daniel Maclise displayed the history painting Caxton Showing the First Specimen of His Printing to King Edward IV depicting a scene from the fifteenth century.

Francis Grant who had established himself as a leading portraitist of the early Victorian period submitted several pictures of High society figures. Clarkson Stanfield displayed the landscape Trajan's Arch, Ancona as well as the battle painting The Battle of Roveredo depicting a scene from the French Revolutionary Wars. John Martin displayed The Valley Of The Thames Viewed From Richmond Hill.

Amongst Pre-Raphaelite paintings on display were John Everett Millais' The Woodman's Daughter, The Return of the Dove to the Ark and Mariana as well as William Holman Hunt's Valentine Rescuing Sylvia from Proteus.

== Gallery ==
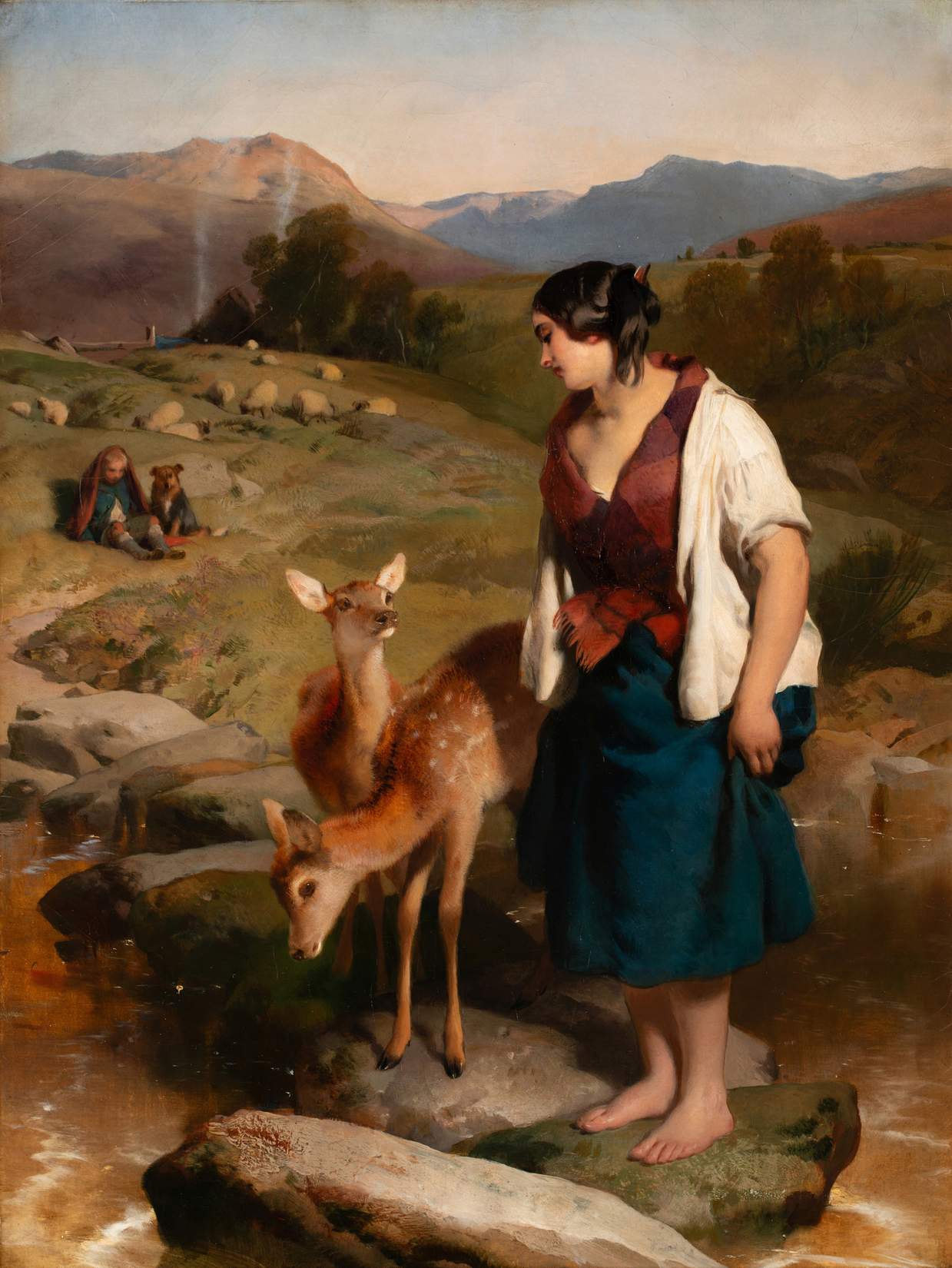
The Highland Lassie by Edwin Landseer

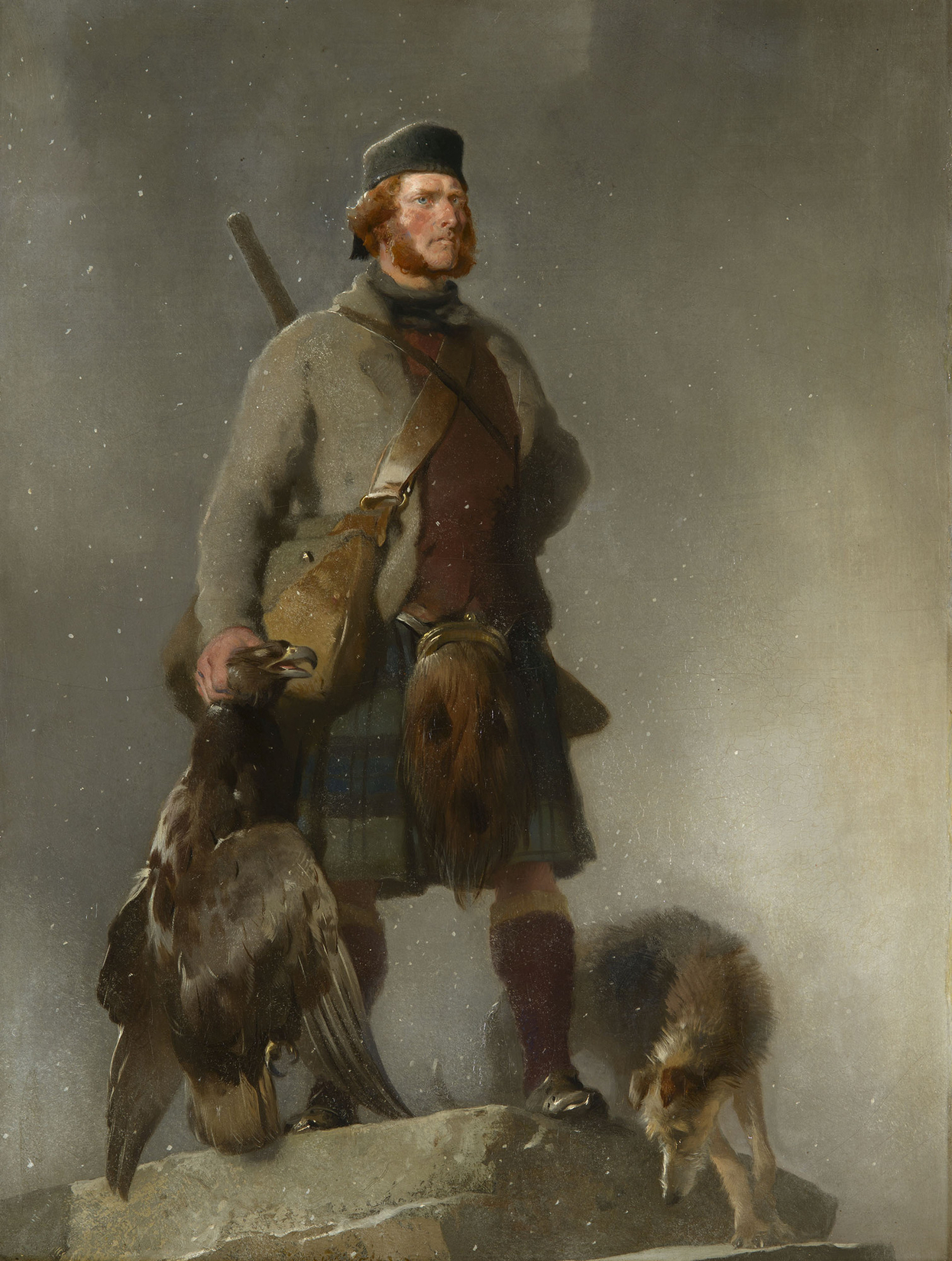
The Highlander by Edwin Landseer

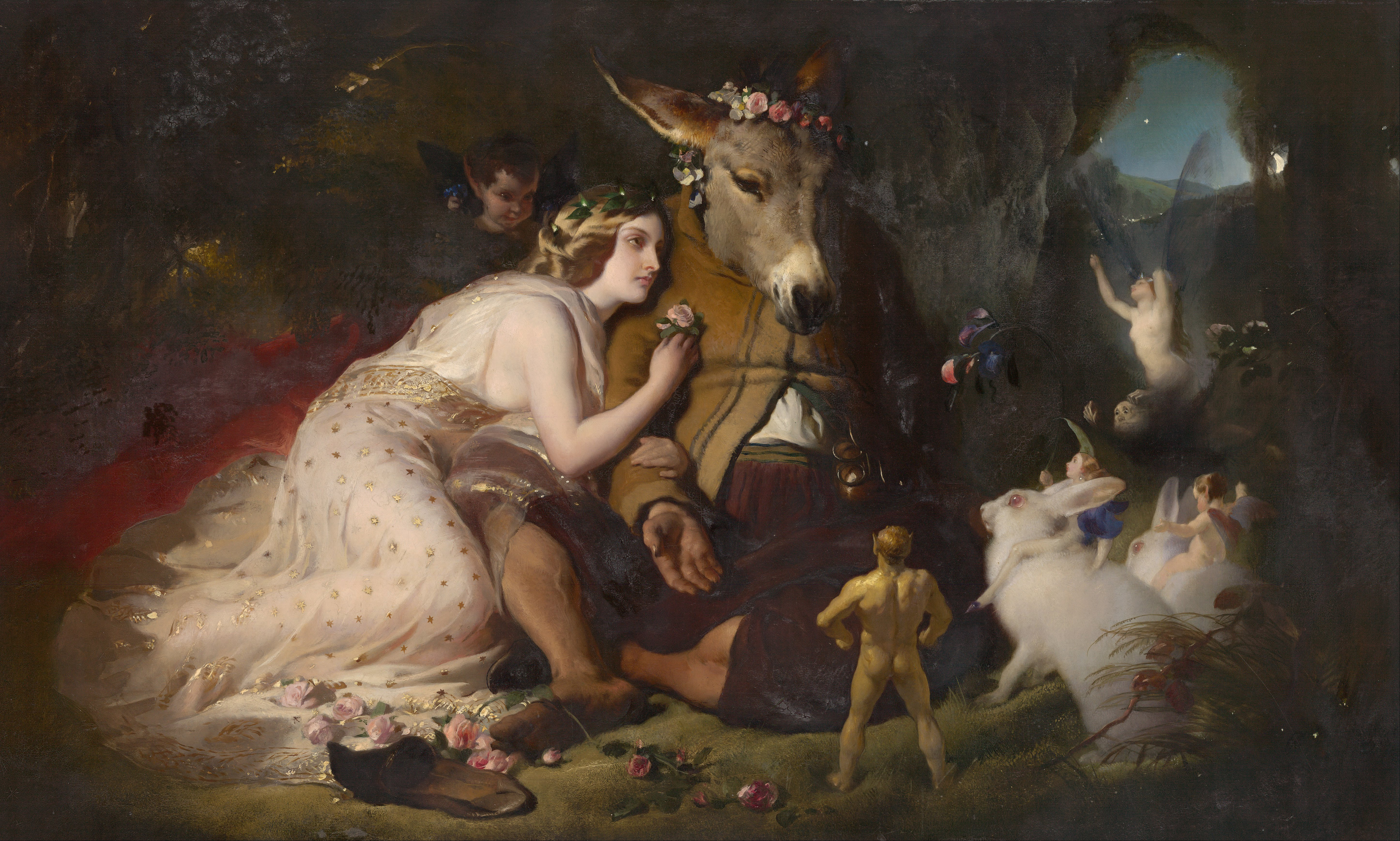
A Midsummer Night's Dream by Edwin Landseer

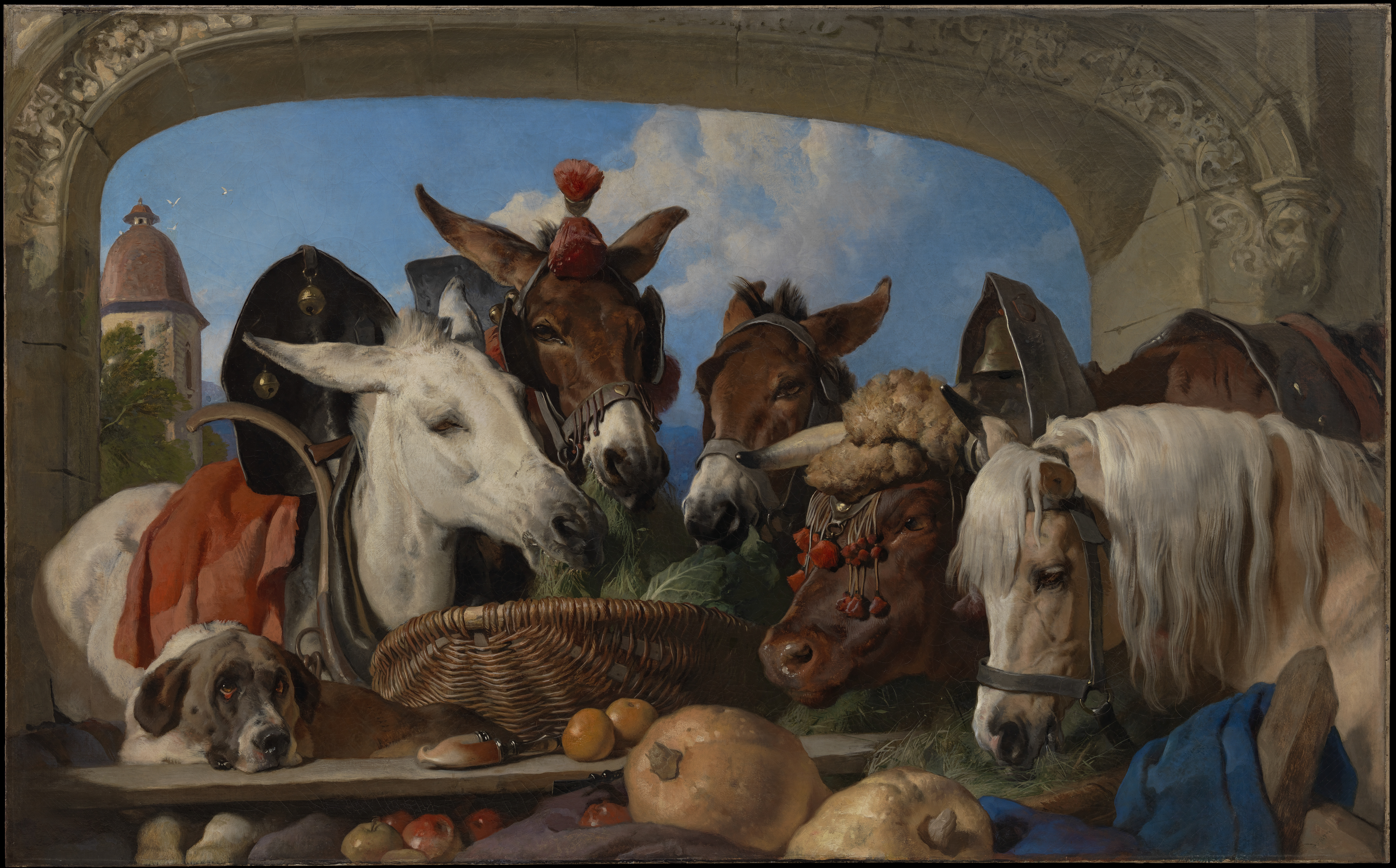
A Group of Animals, Geneva by Edwin Landseer and David Roberts

Hogarth Brought Before the Governor of Calais as a Spy by William Powell Frith

Interior of the Church of St Anne, Bruges by David Roberts

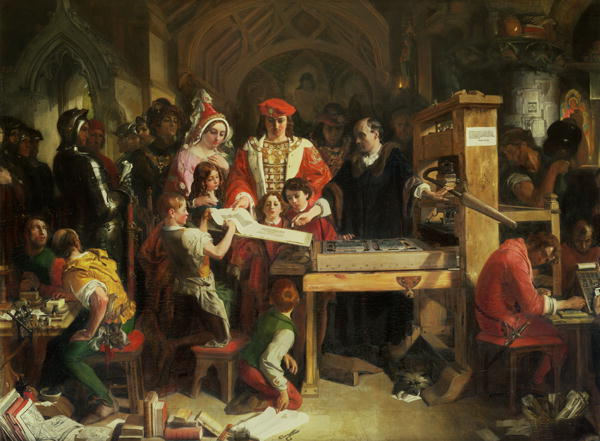
Caxton Showing the First Specimen of His Printing to King Edward IV by Daniel Maclise

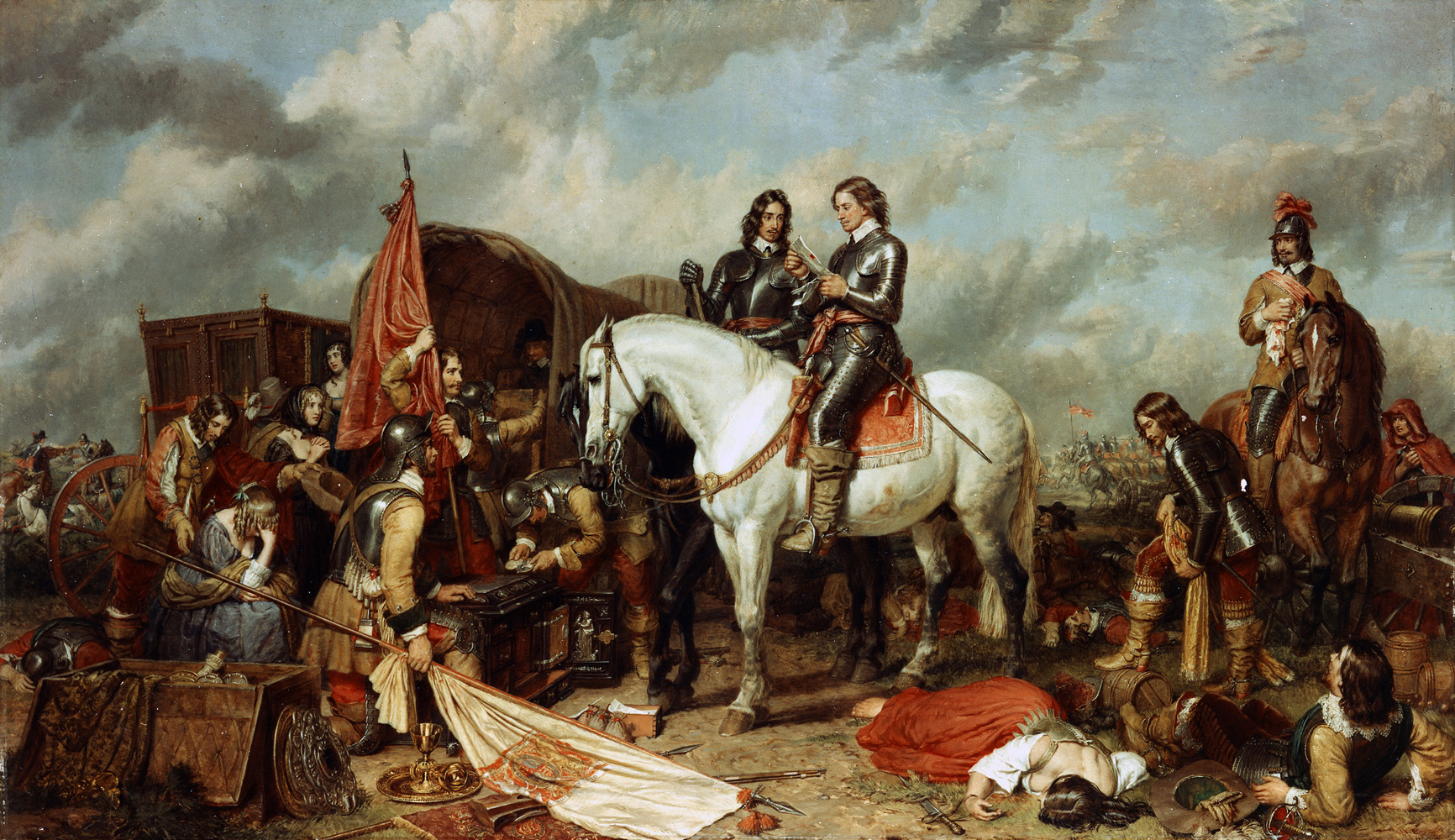
Cromwell at the Battle of Naseby by Charles Landseer

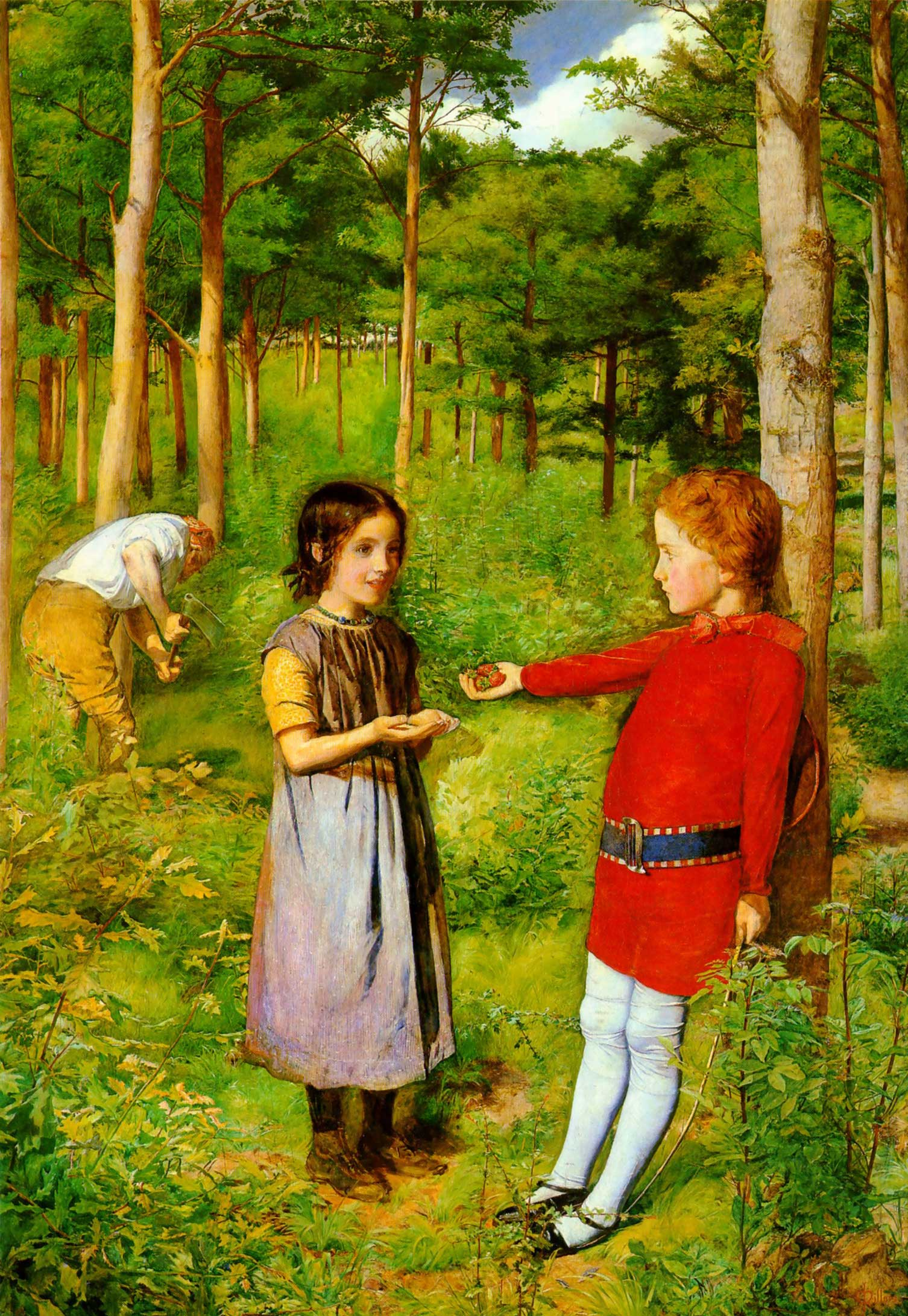
The Woodman's Daughter by John Everett Millais

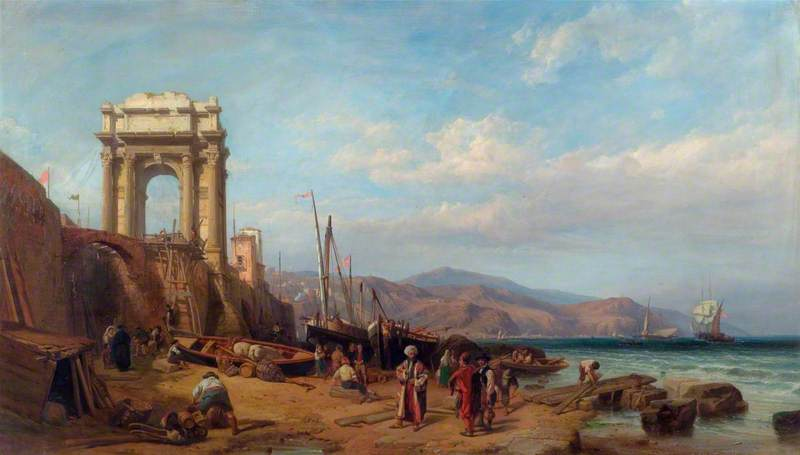
Trajan's Arch, Ancona by Clarkson Stanfield

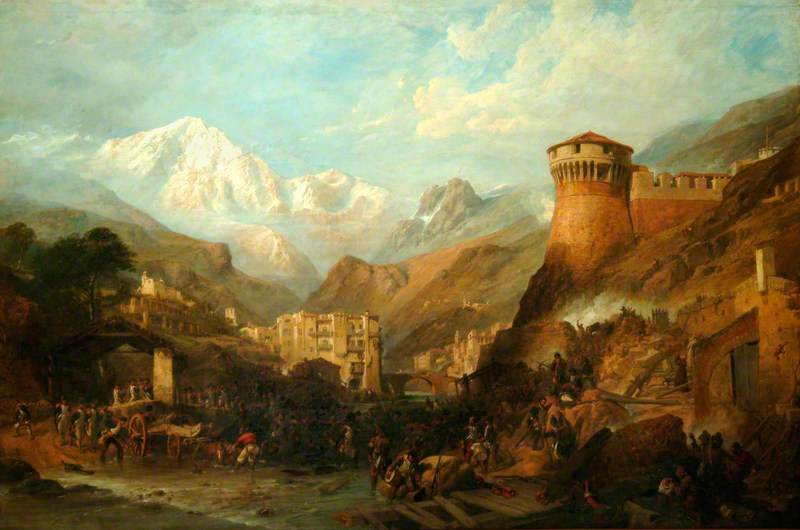
The Battle of Roveredo by Clarkson Stanfield

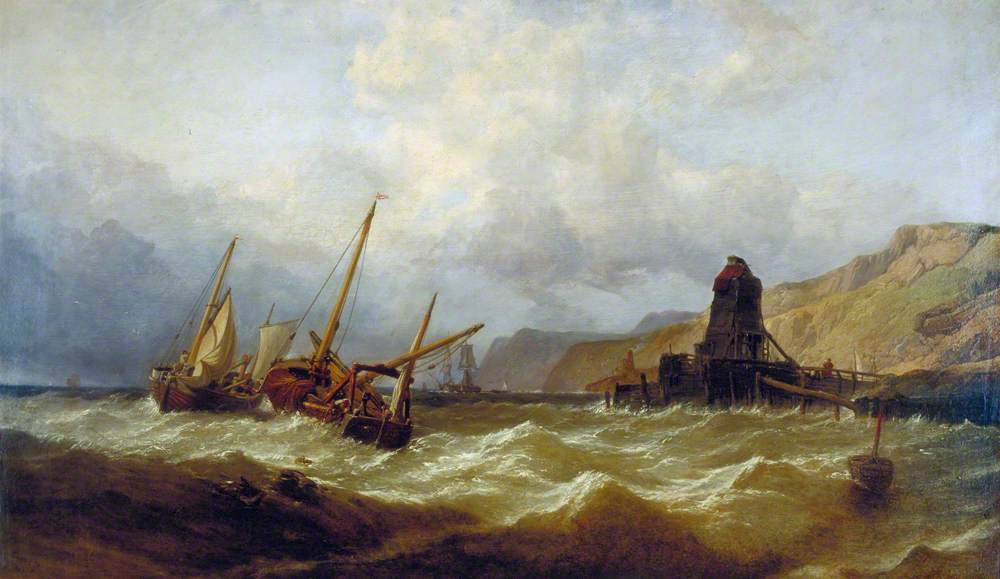
Oxwich Bay by Clarkson Stanfield

Greenwich Hospital from the West Side by James Holland

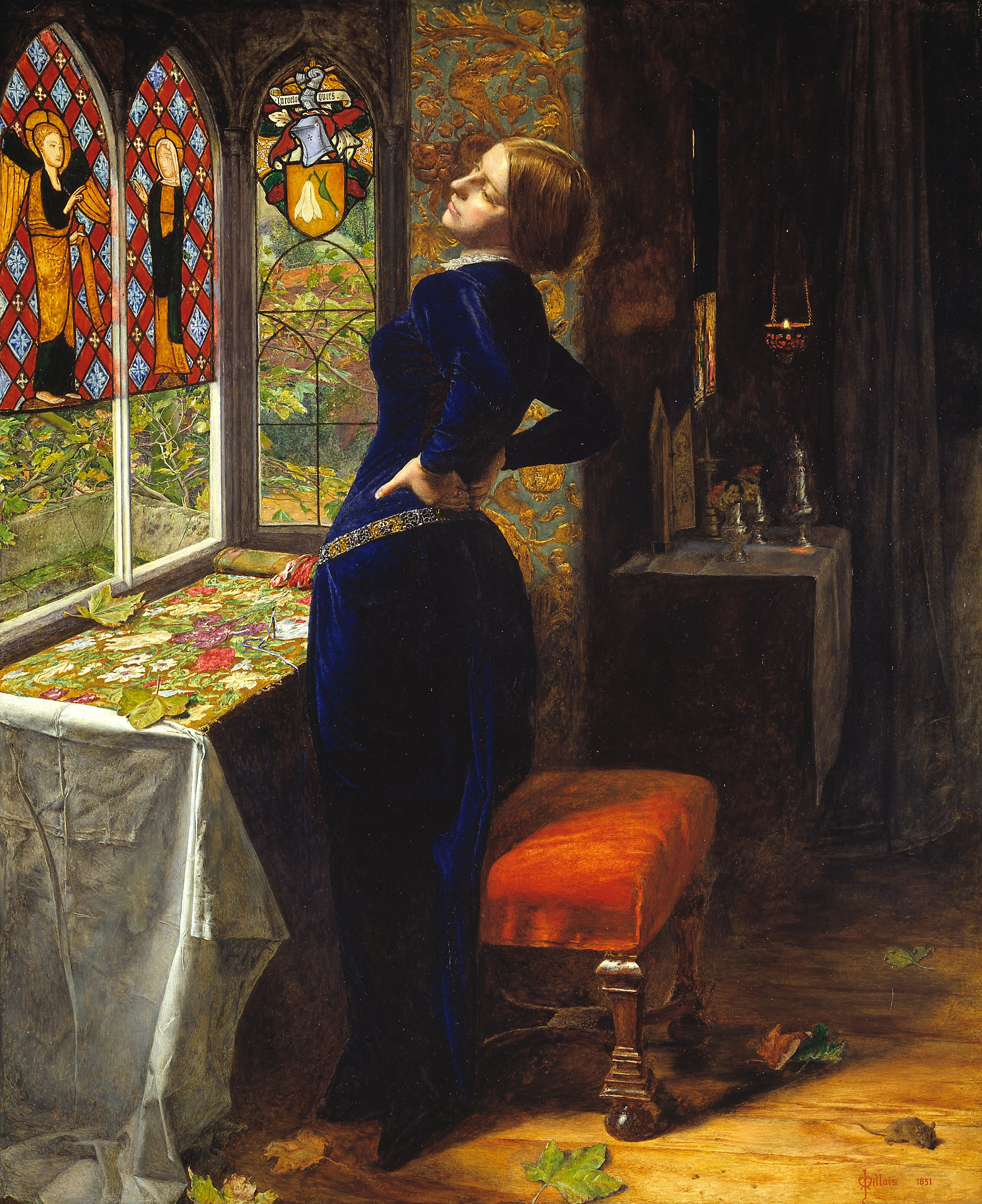
Mariana by John Everett Millais

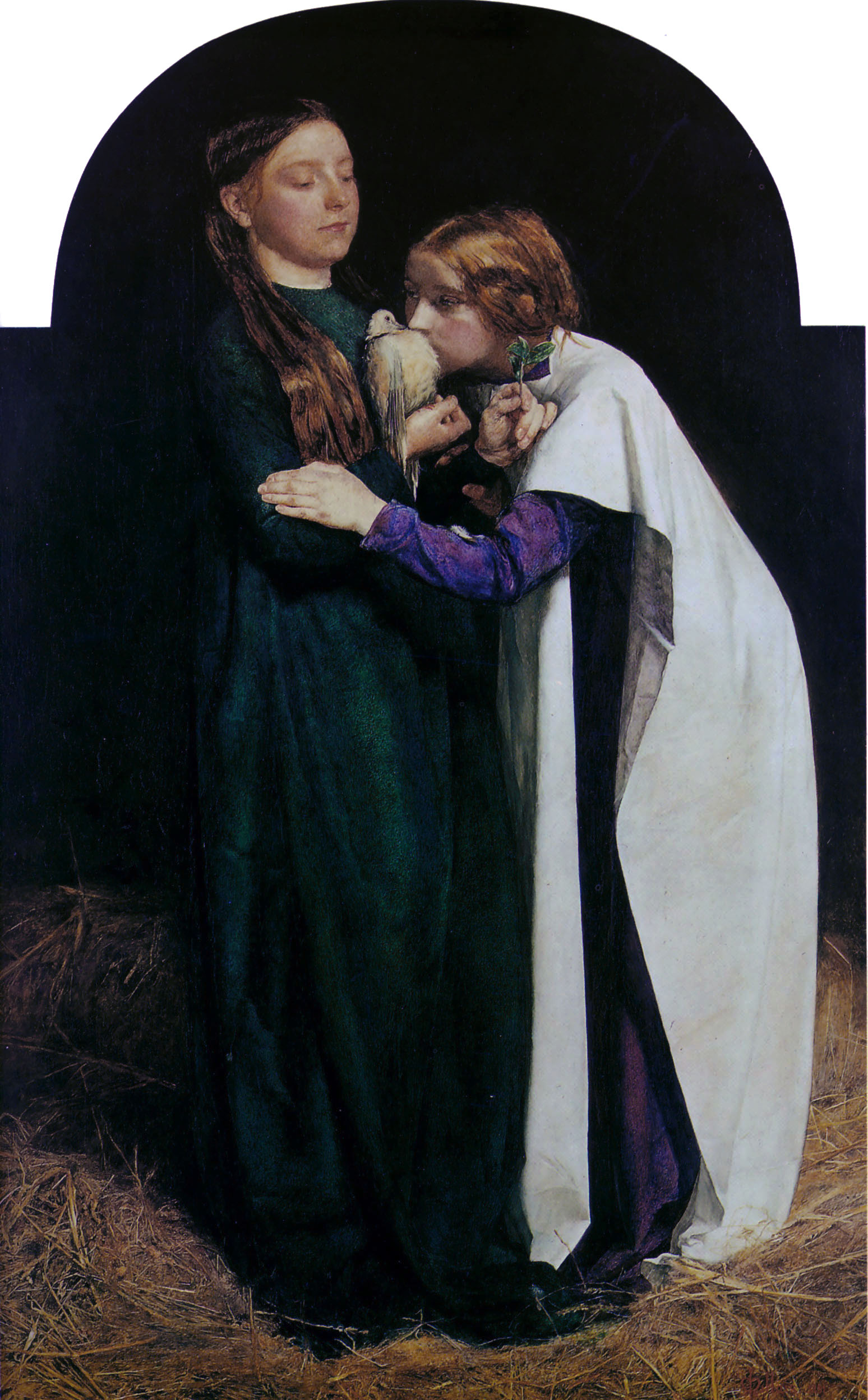
The Return of the Dove to the Ark by John Everett Millais

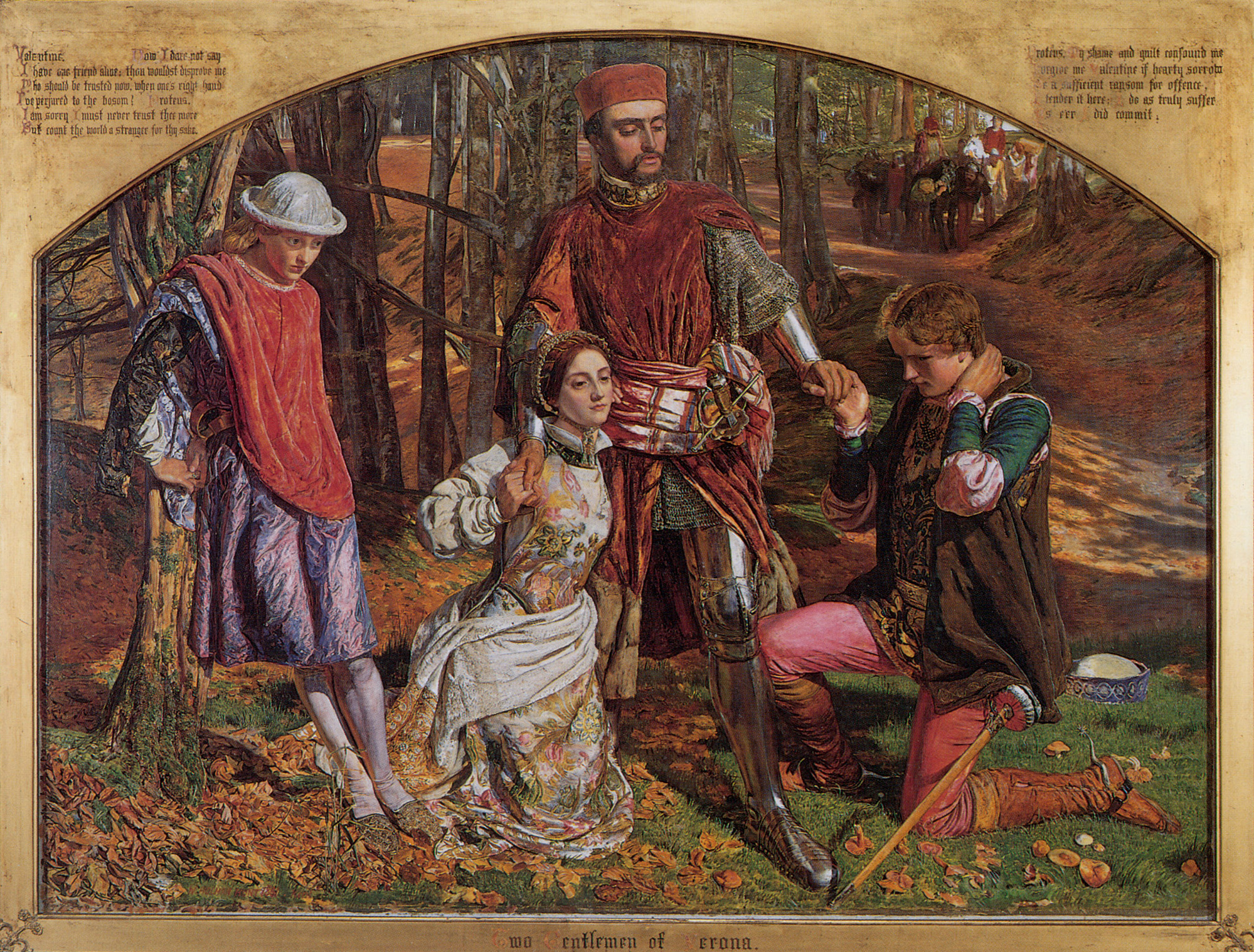
Valentine Rescuing Sylvia from Proteus by Holman Hunt

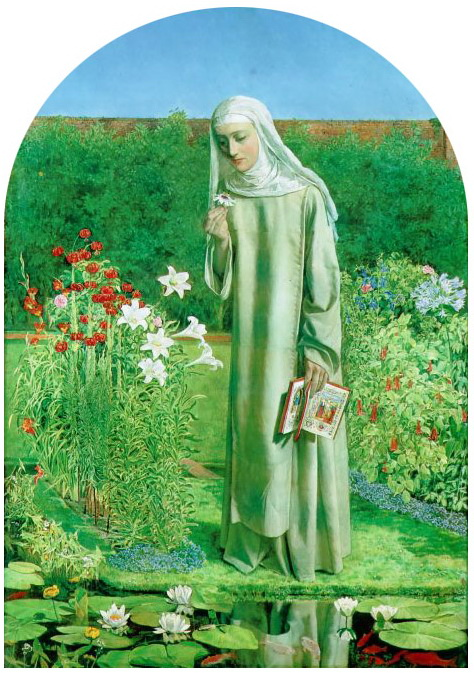
Convent Thoughts by Charles Allston Collins

John Gilpin, Delayed by his Customers by Edward Matthew Ward

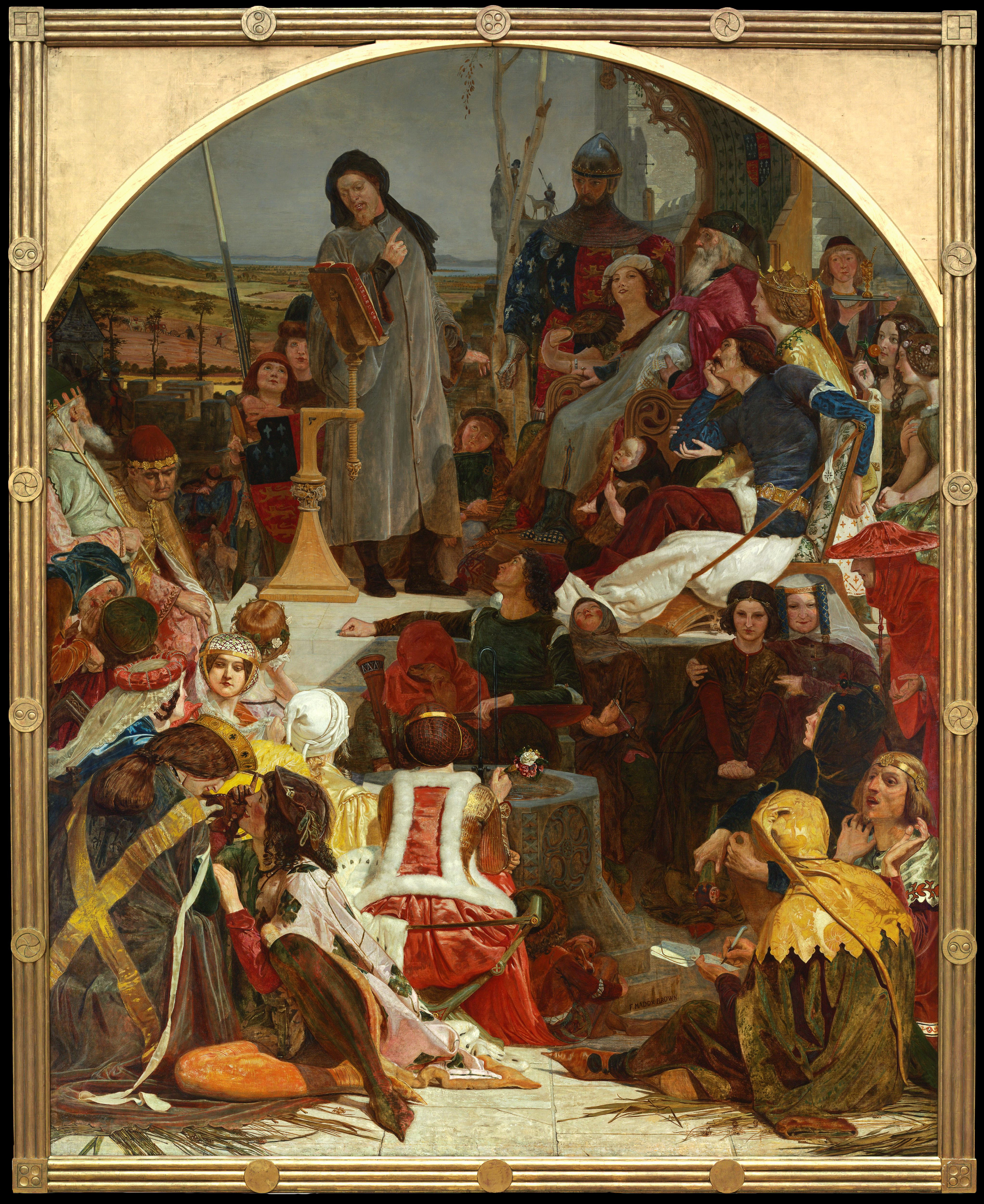
Chaucer at the Court of Edward III by Ford Madox Brown

The Royal Family of France in the Prison of the Temple by Edward Matthew Ward

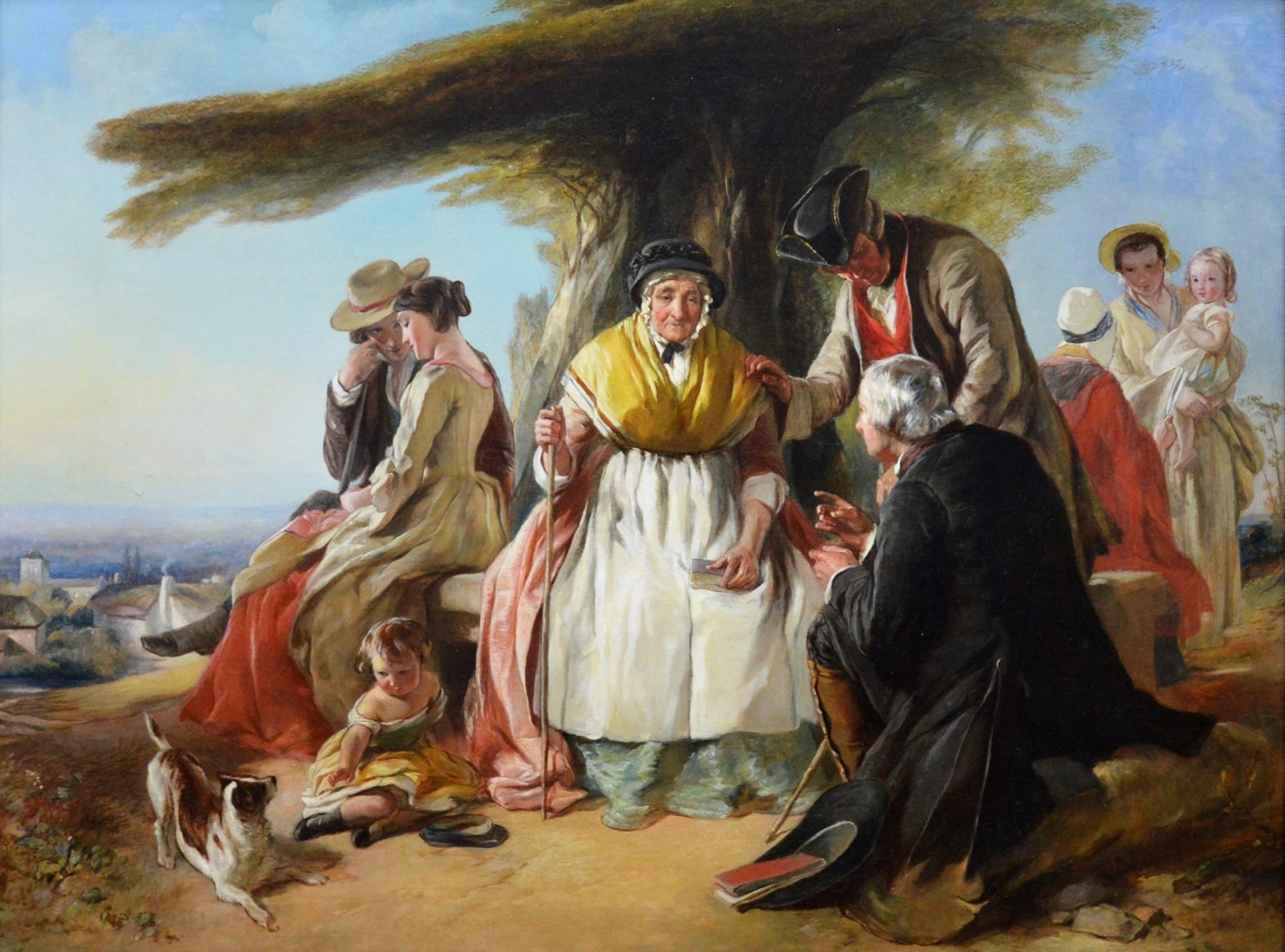
Youth and Age by John Callcott Horsley

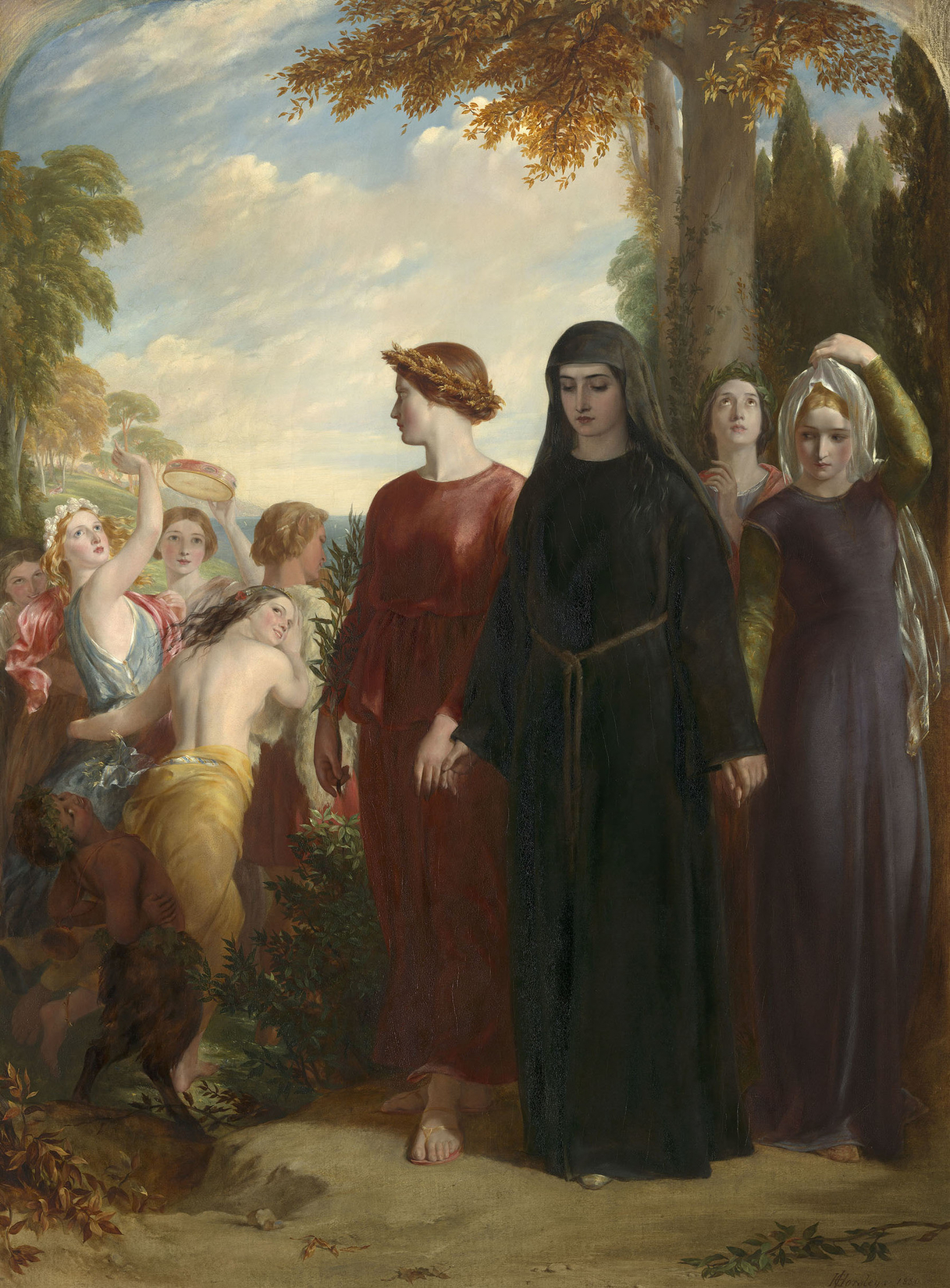
L'Allegro and Il Penseroso by John Callcott Horsley

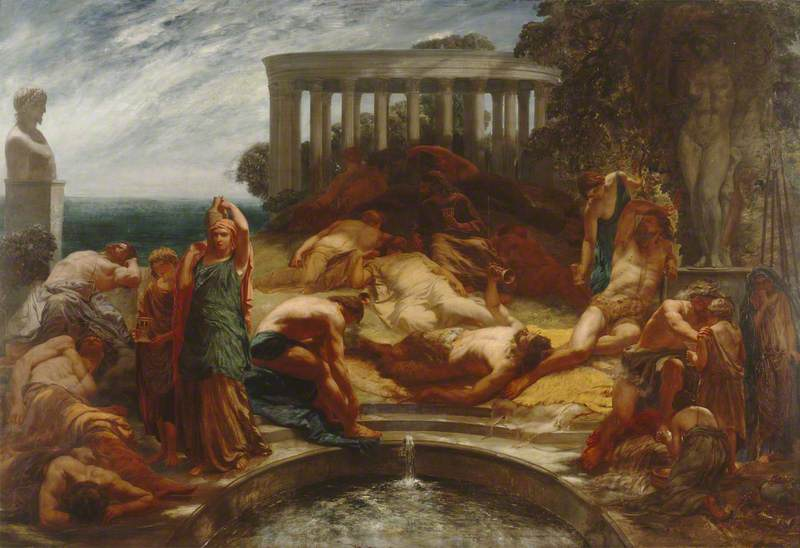
The Goths in Italy by Paul Falconer Poole

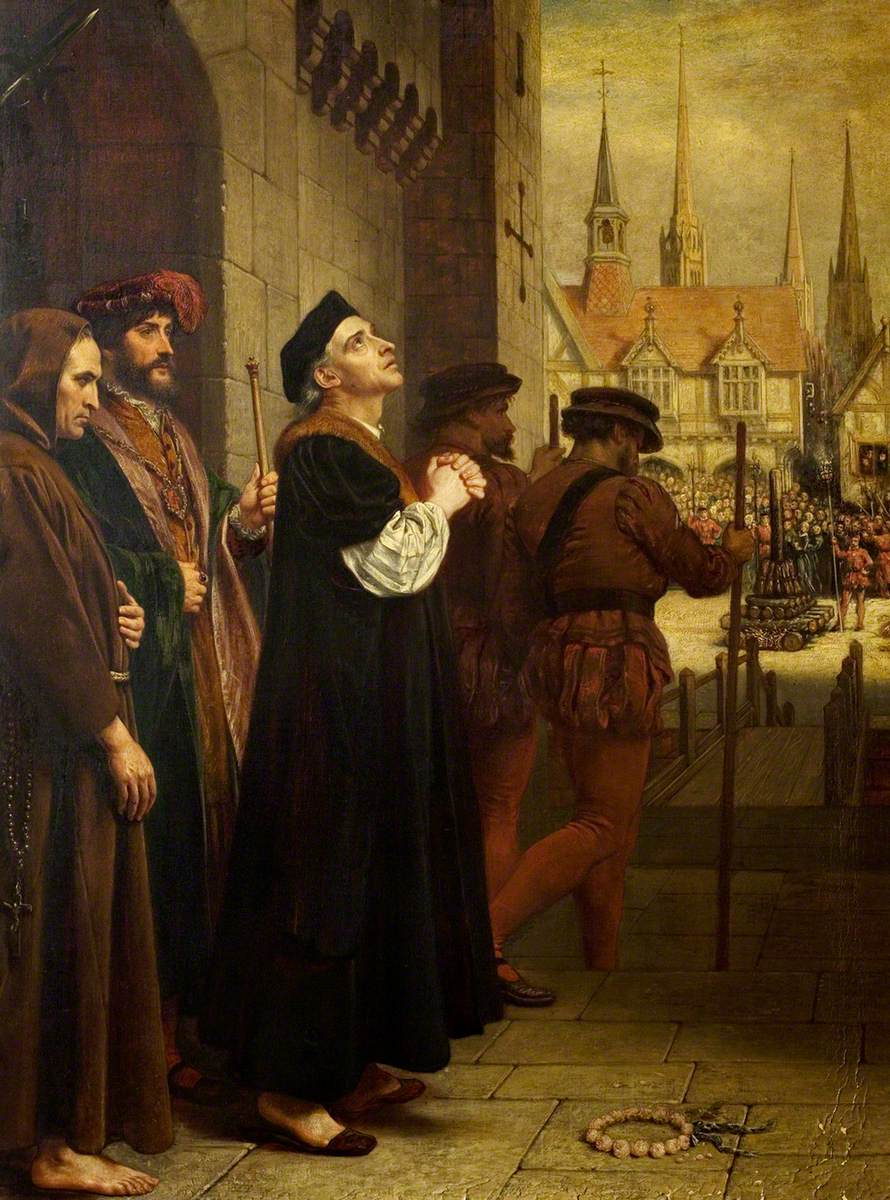
The Martyrdom of Laurence Saunders by Charles West Cope

Pepys and Nell Gwynne by Augustus Leopold Egg

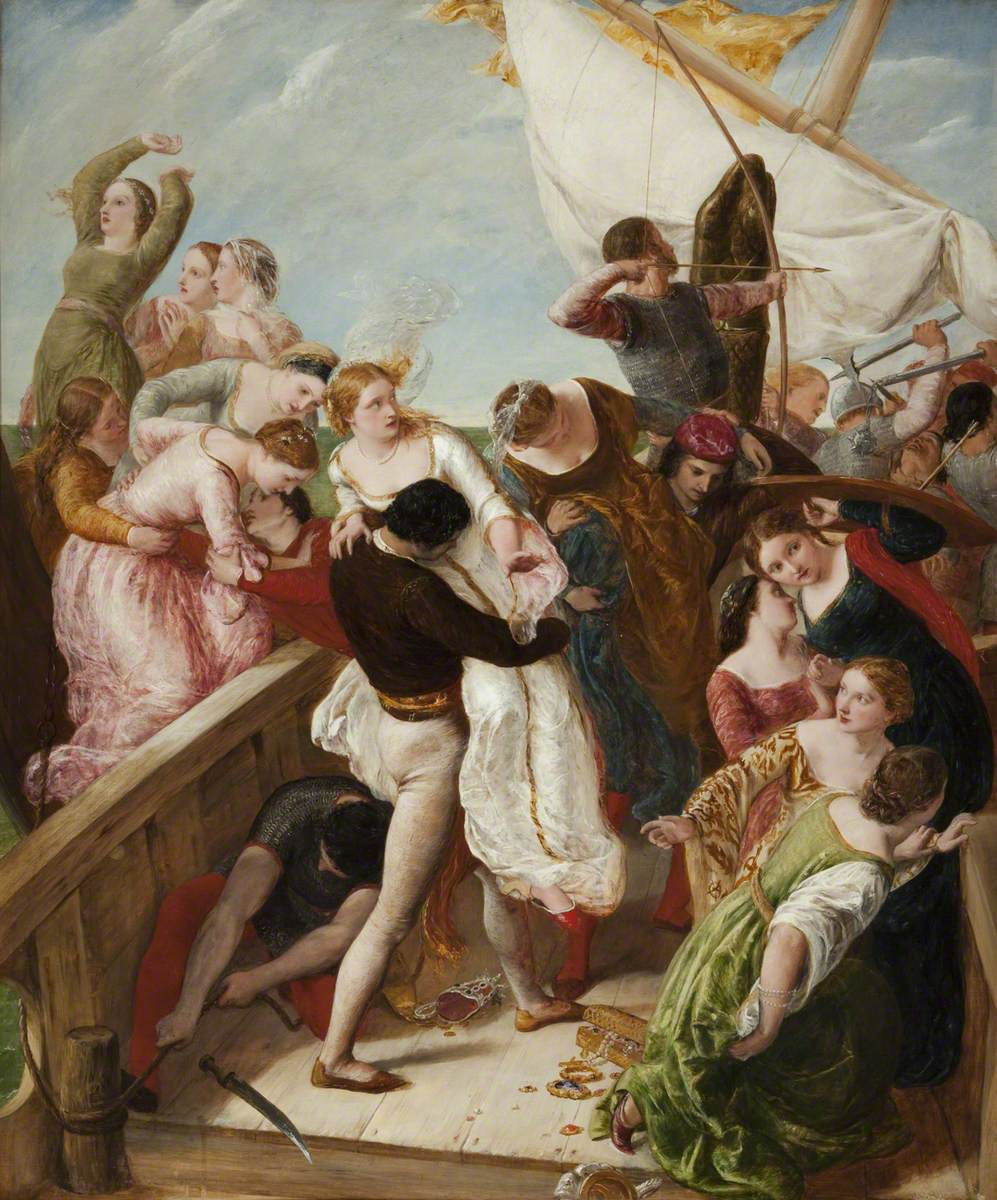
The Rescue of the Brides of Venice by James Clarke Hook

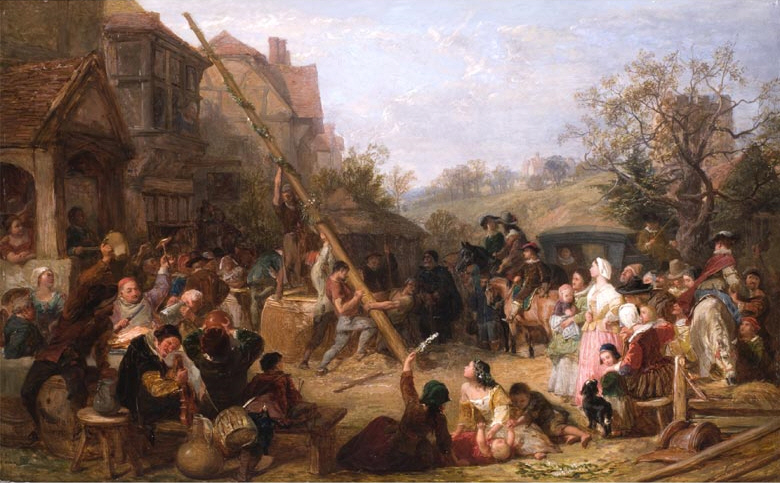
Raising the Maypole by Frederick Goodall

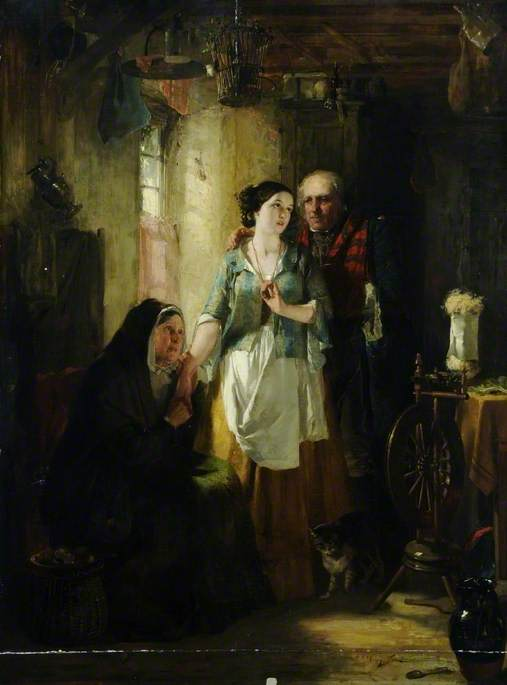
Auld Robin Gray by Thomas Faed

The First Step by Thomas Faed

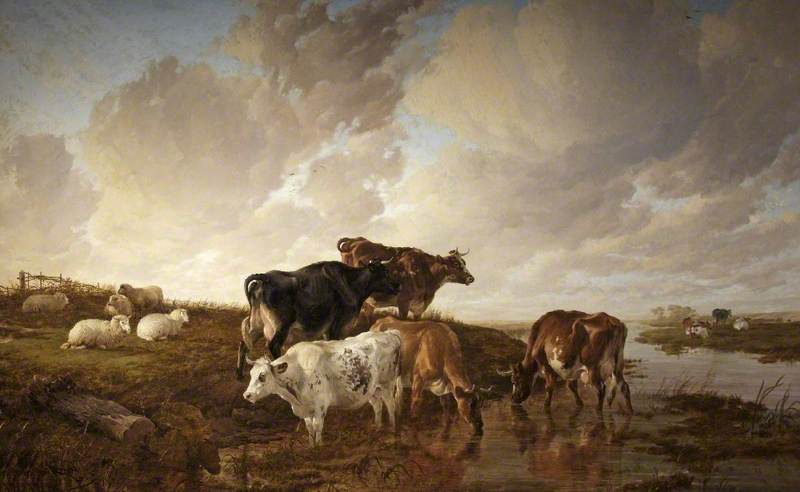
The Evening Drink in the Canterbury Meadows by Thomas Sidney Cooper

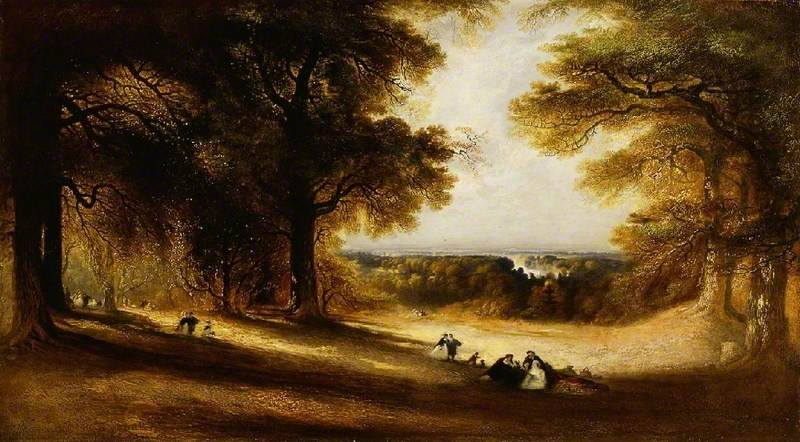
View in Richmond Park by John Martin

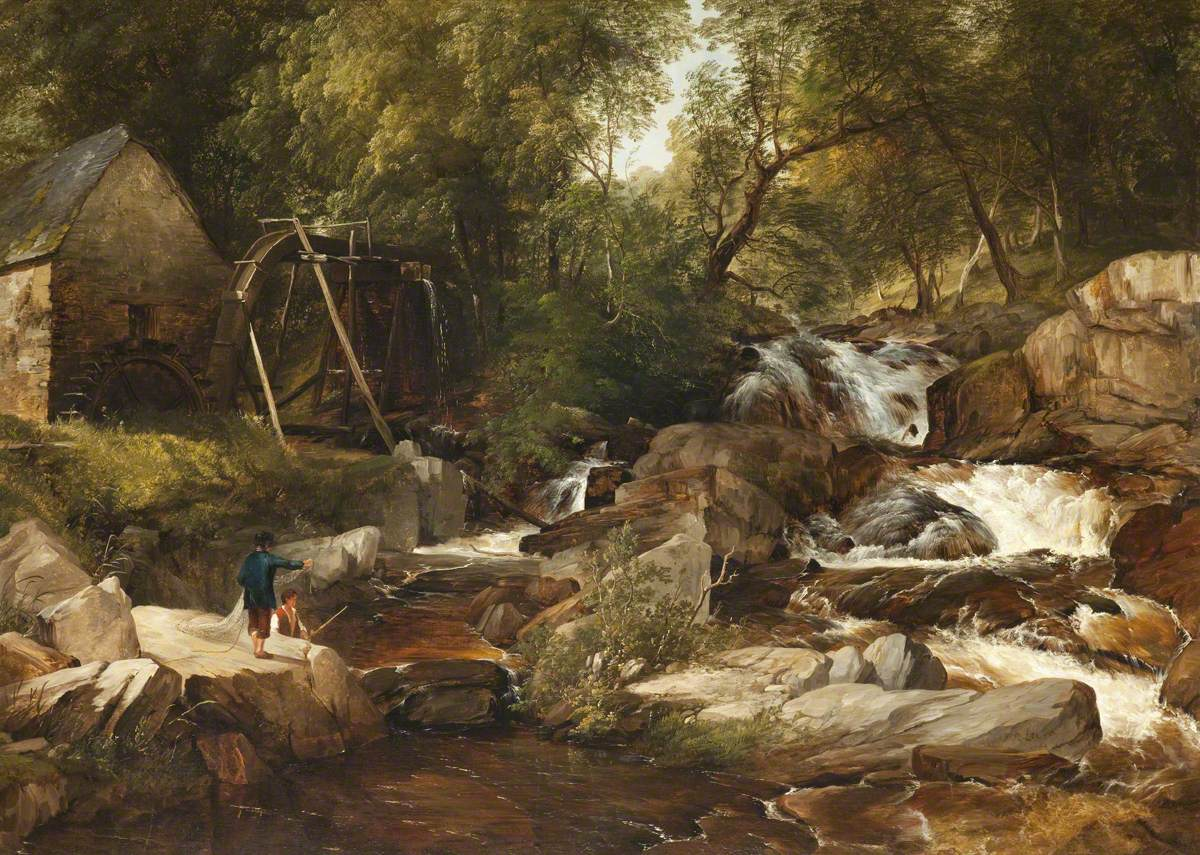
A Highland Stream by Frederick Richard Lee

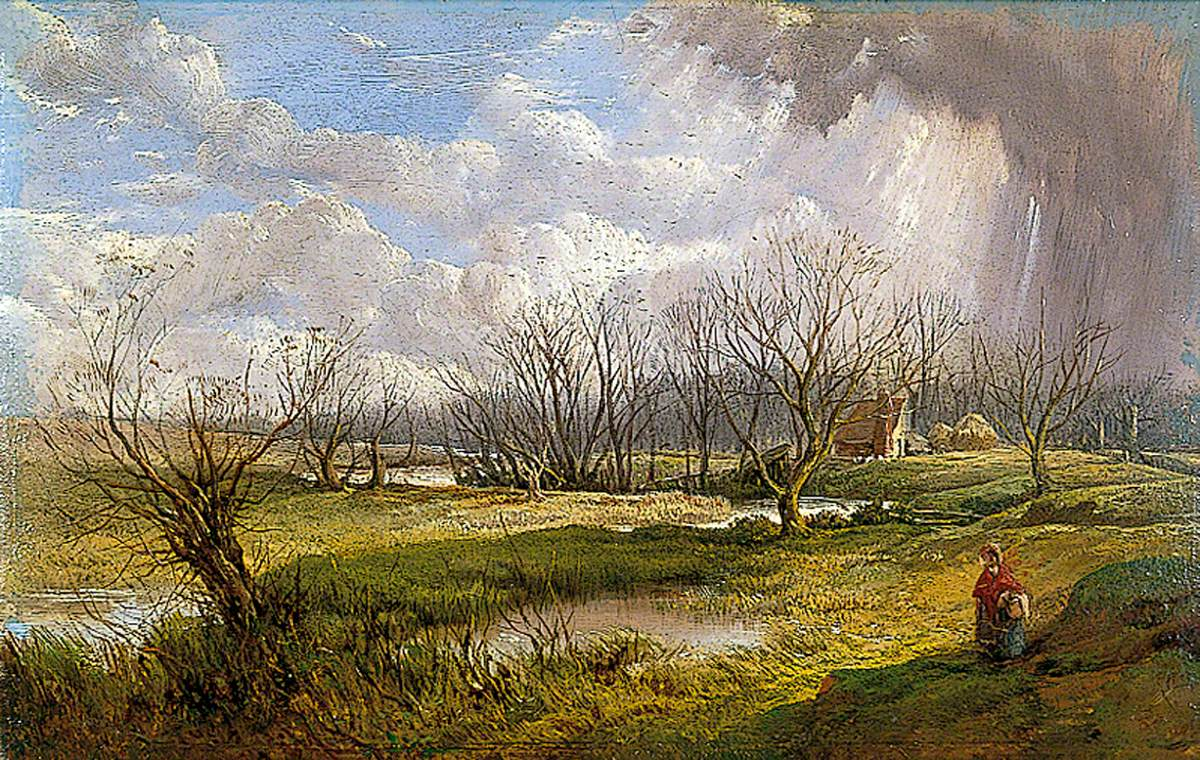
A Fine Day in February by John Middleton

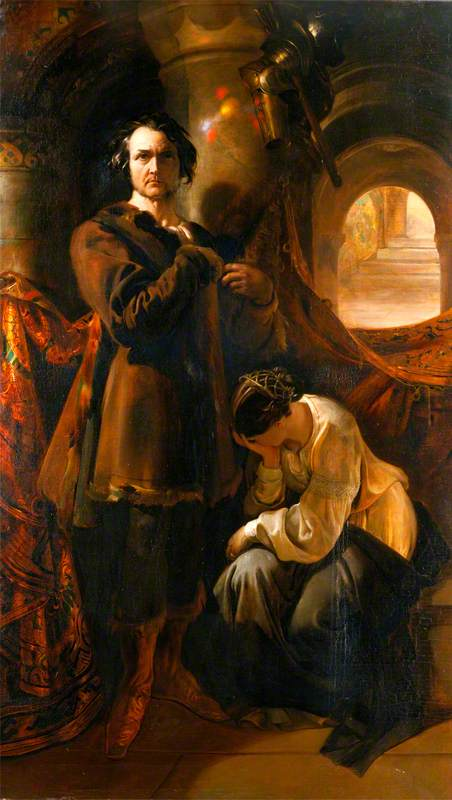
Macready as Werner by Daniel Maclise

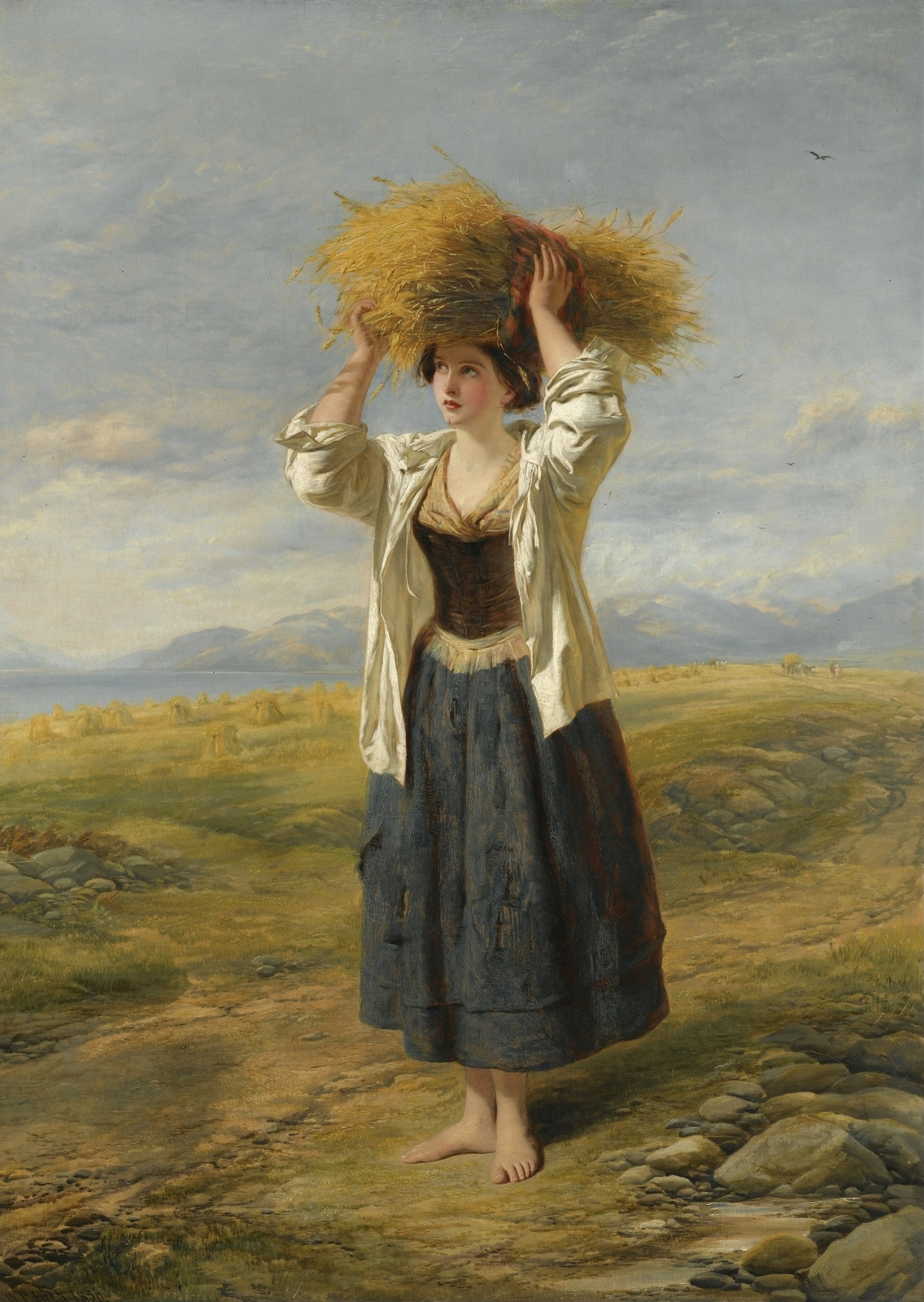
The Little Gleaner by William Powell Frith and Thomas Creswick

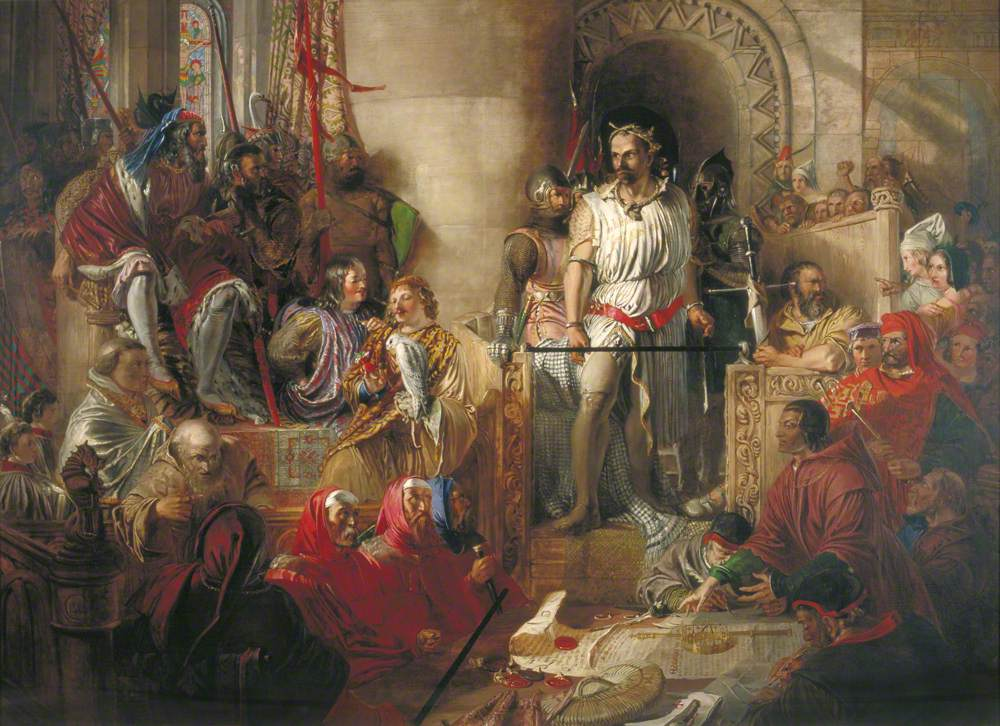
The Trial of Sir William Wallace at Westminster by William Bell Scott

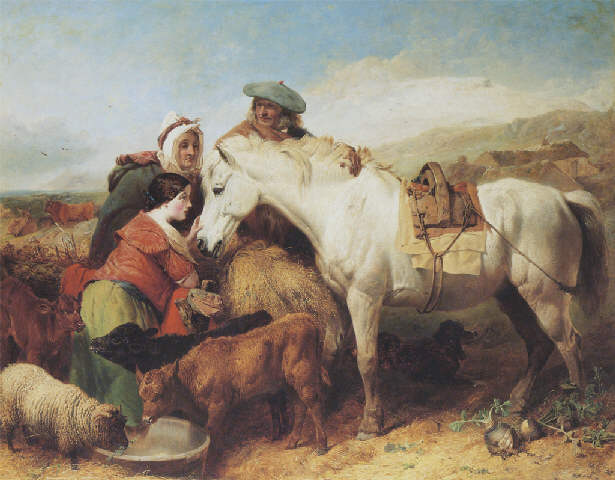
The Auld Farmer's New Year's Gift by Richard Ansdell

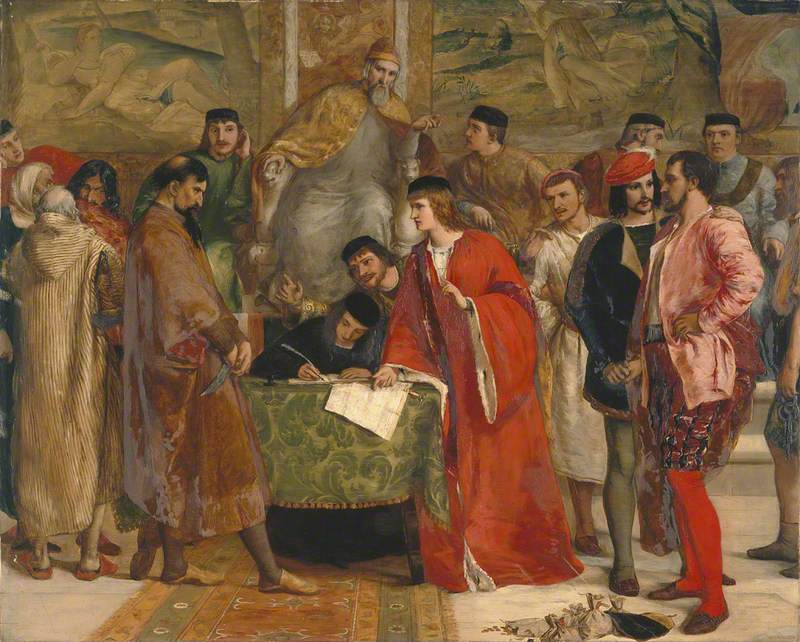
The Defeat of Shylock by James Clarke Hook

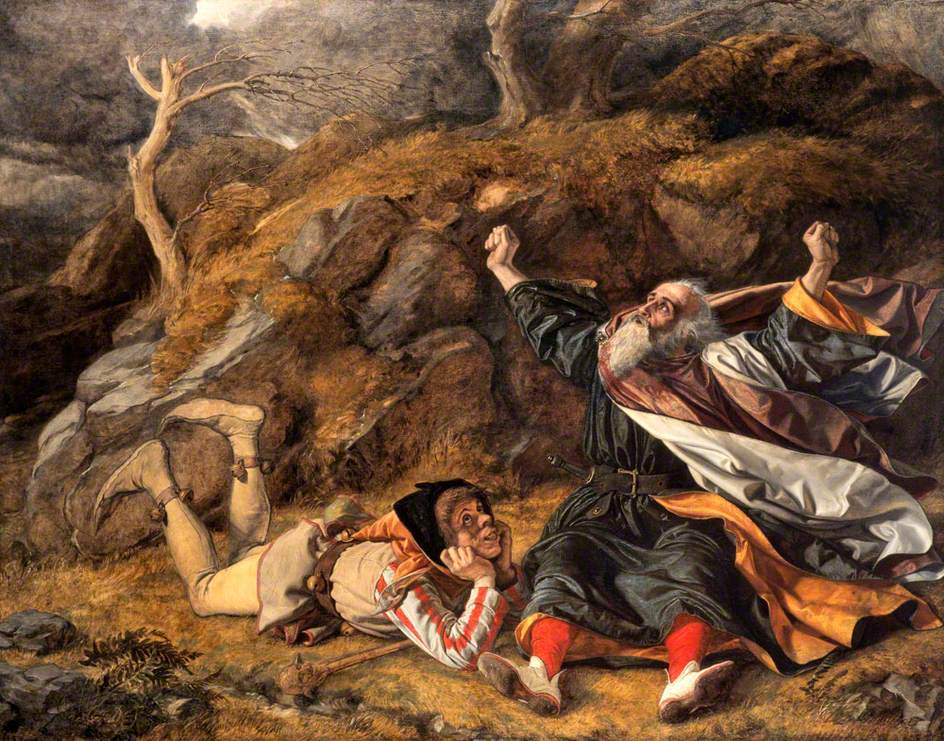
King Lear and the Fool in the Storm by William Dyce

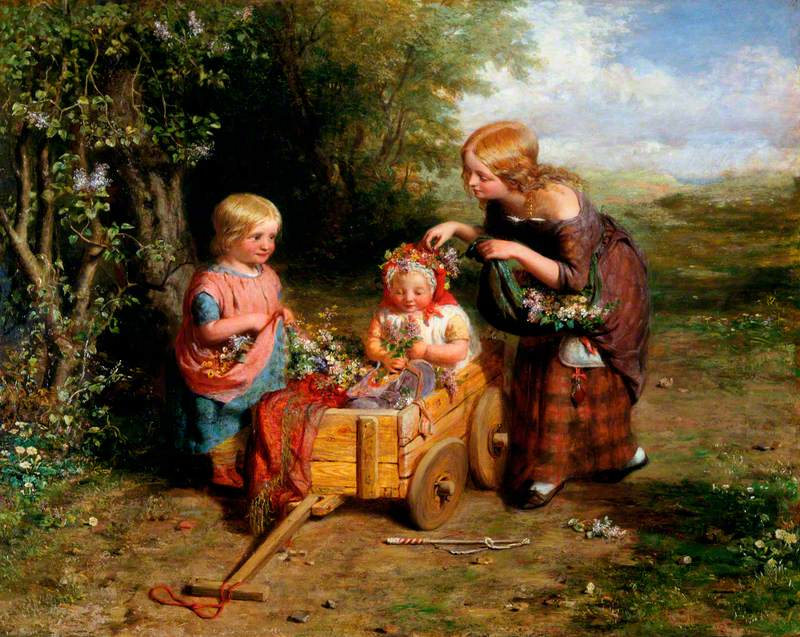
Spring Flowers by George Smith

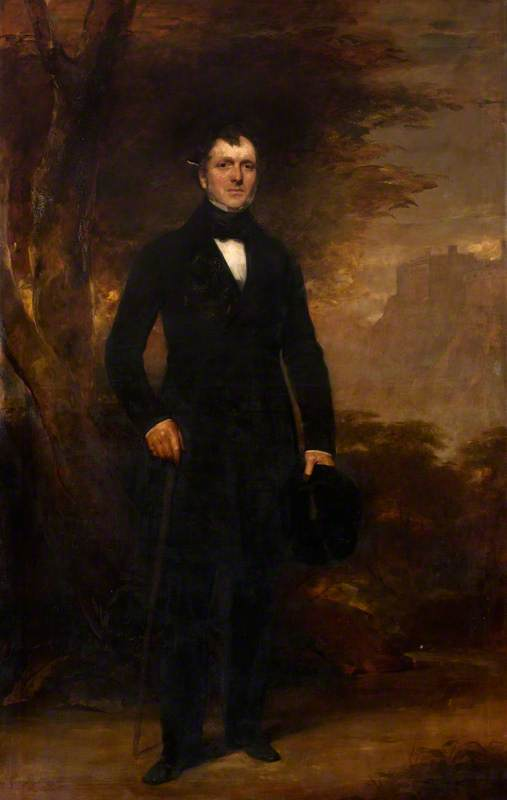
William Gibson Craig by John Watson Gordon

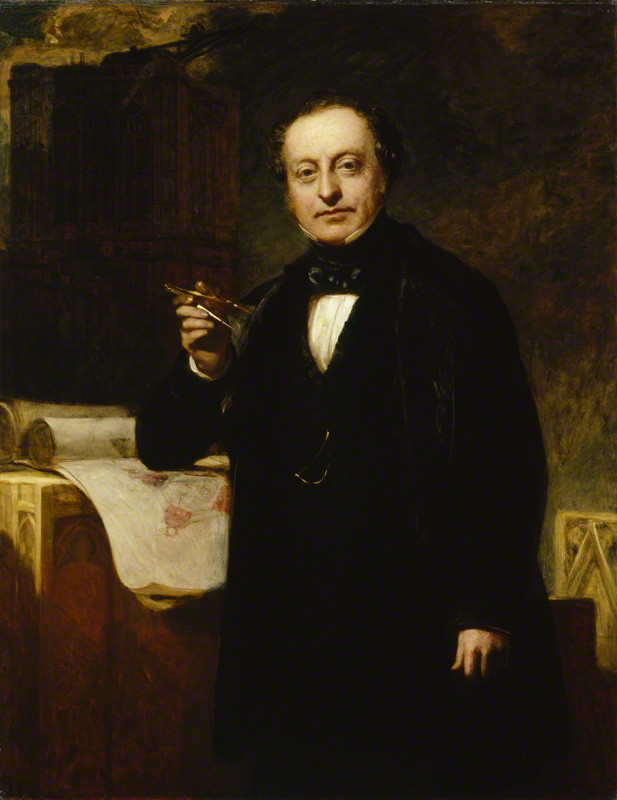
Portrait of Charles Barry by John Prescott Knight

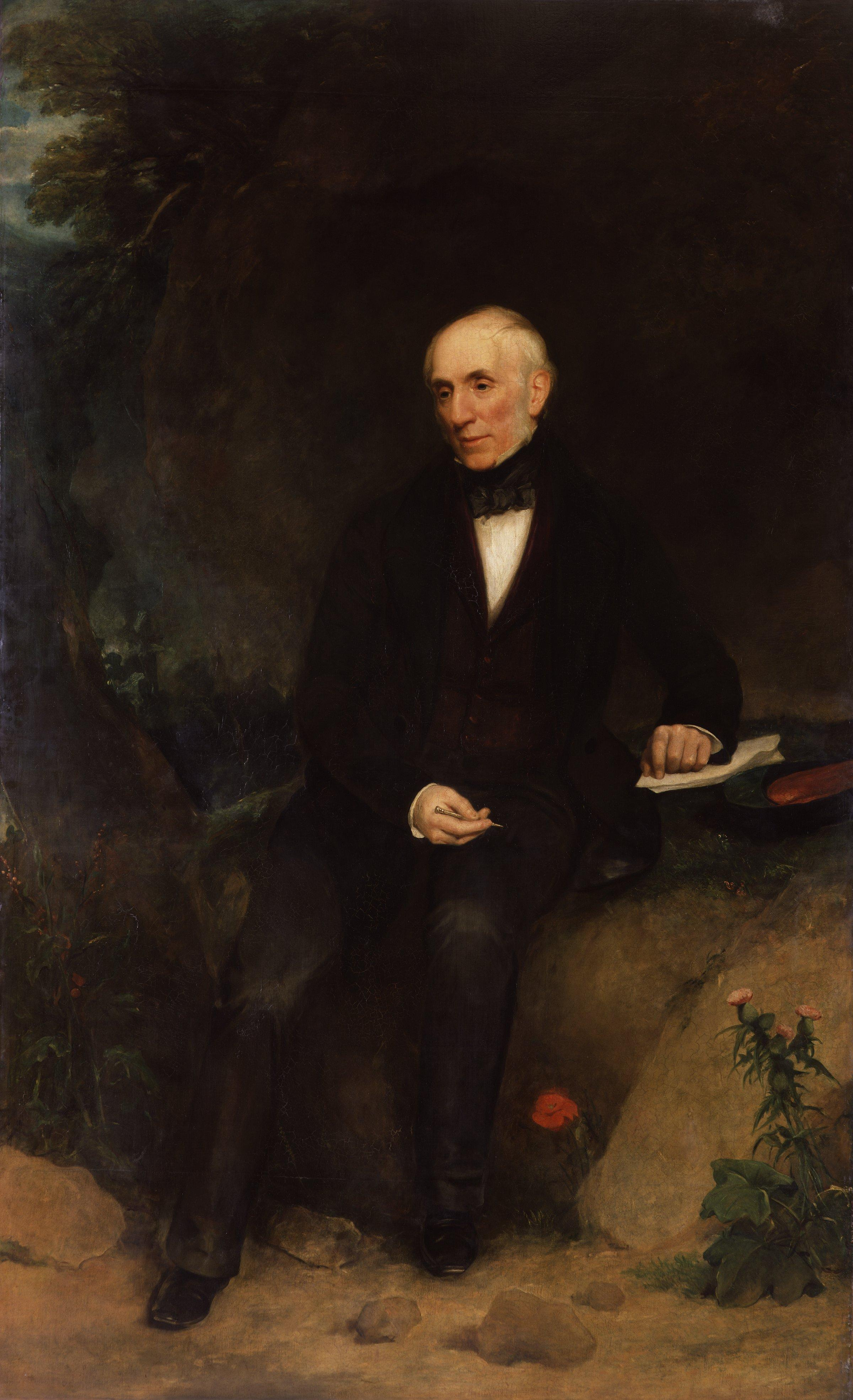
Portrait of William Wordsworth by Henry William Pickersgill

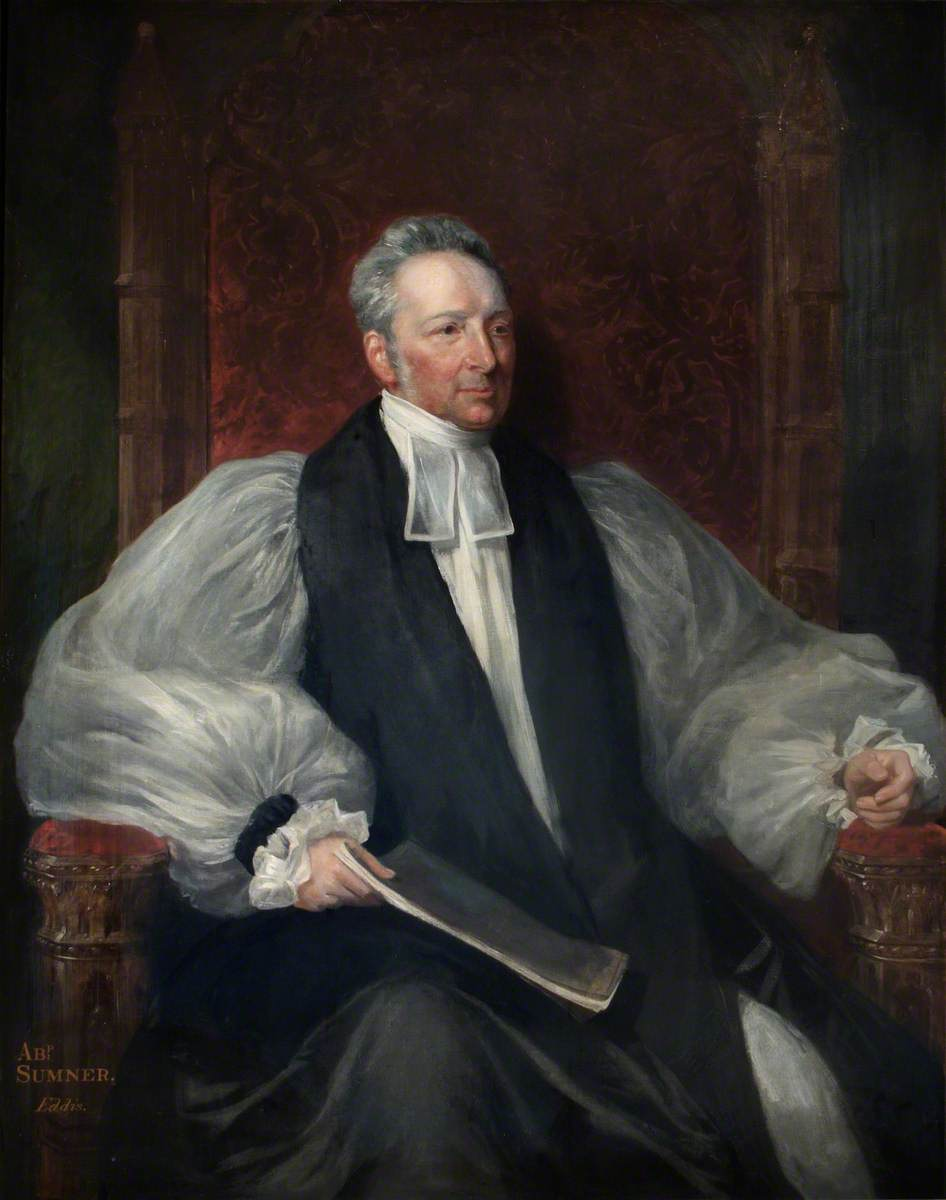
John Bird Sumner by Eden Upton Eddis

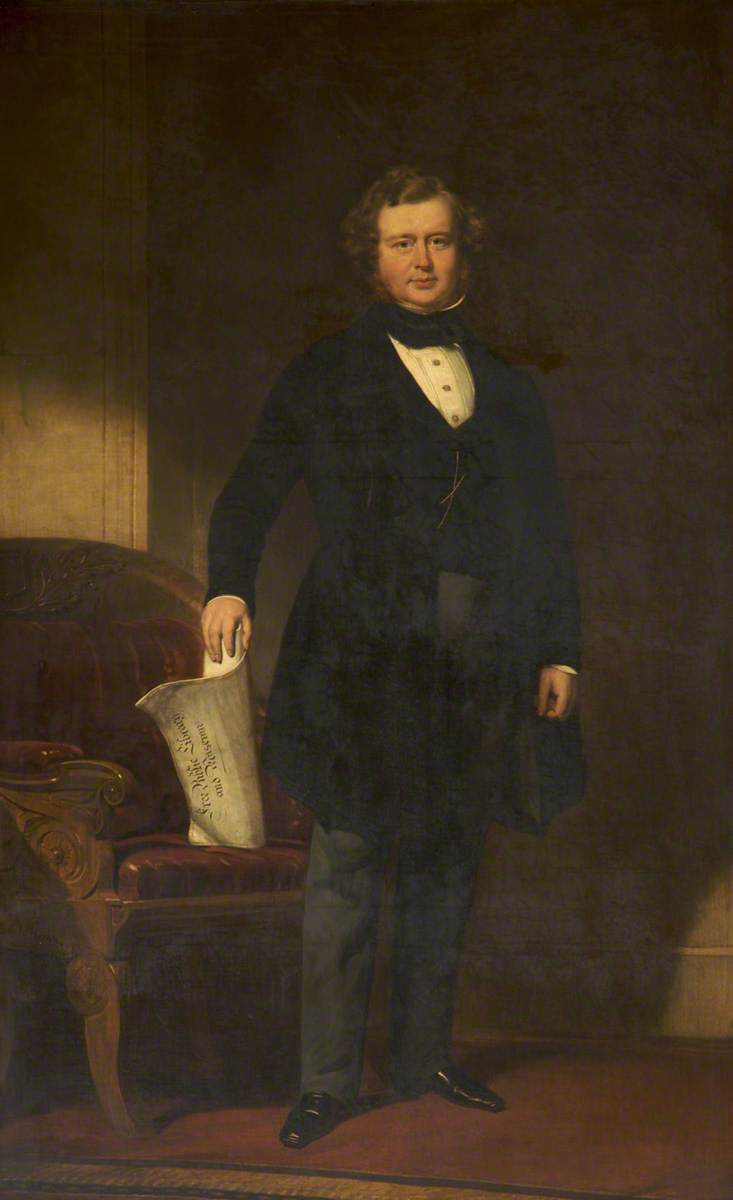
John Potter by George Patten

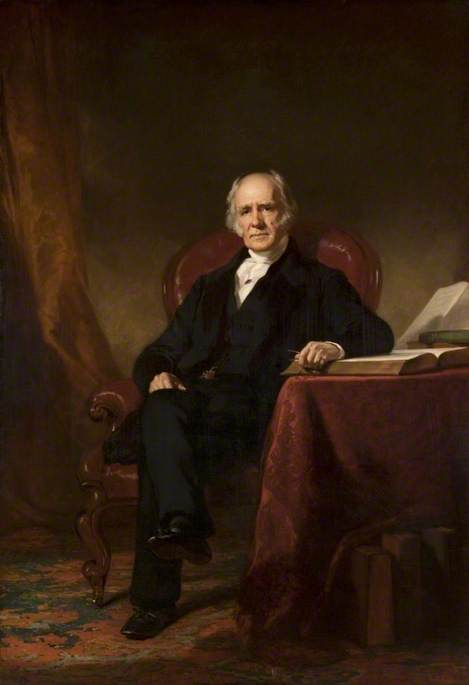
Ralph Wardlaw by Daniel Macnee

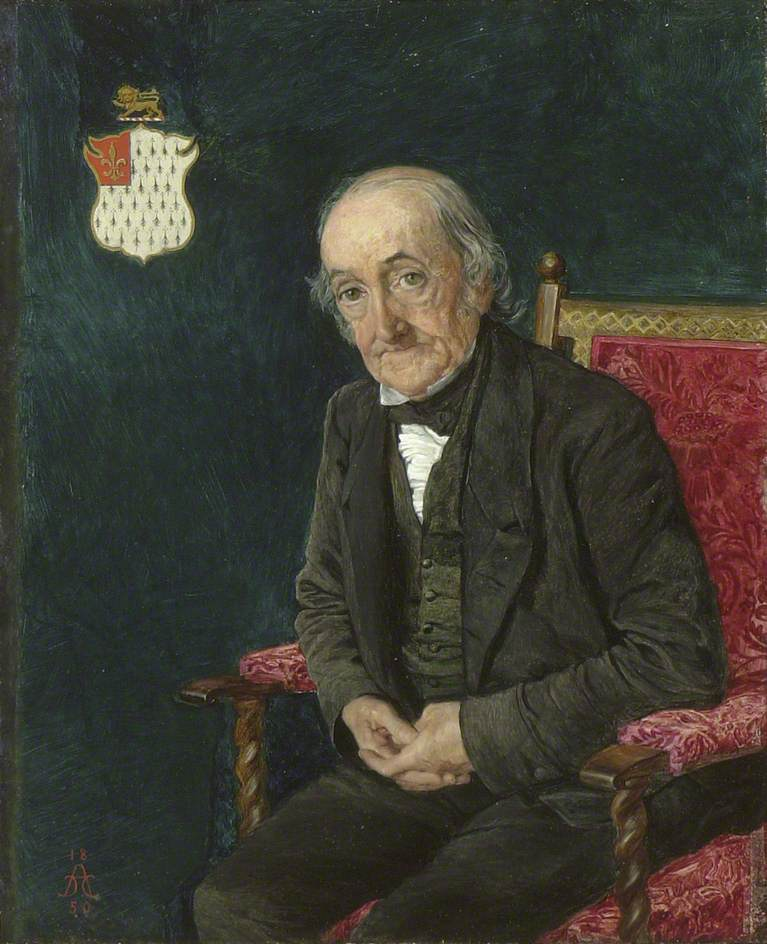
William Bennett by Charles Allston Collins

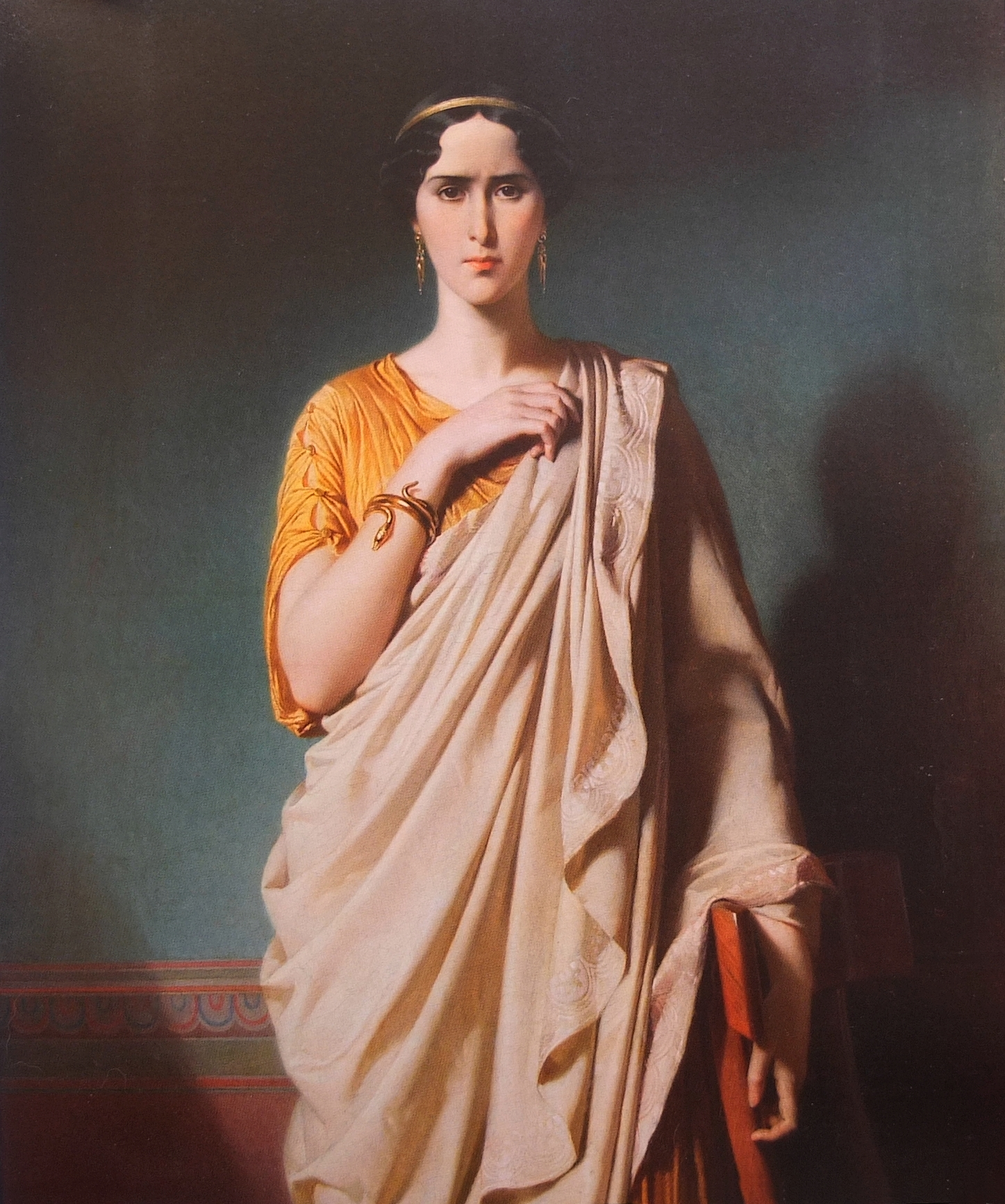
Madame Rachel by Edouard Dubufe

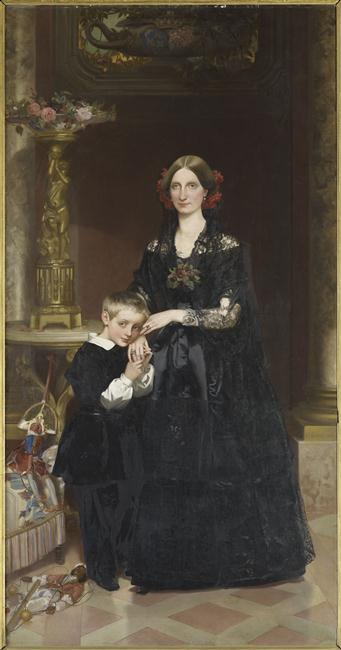
Duchess of Aumale with her son Louis by Victor Mottez

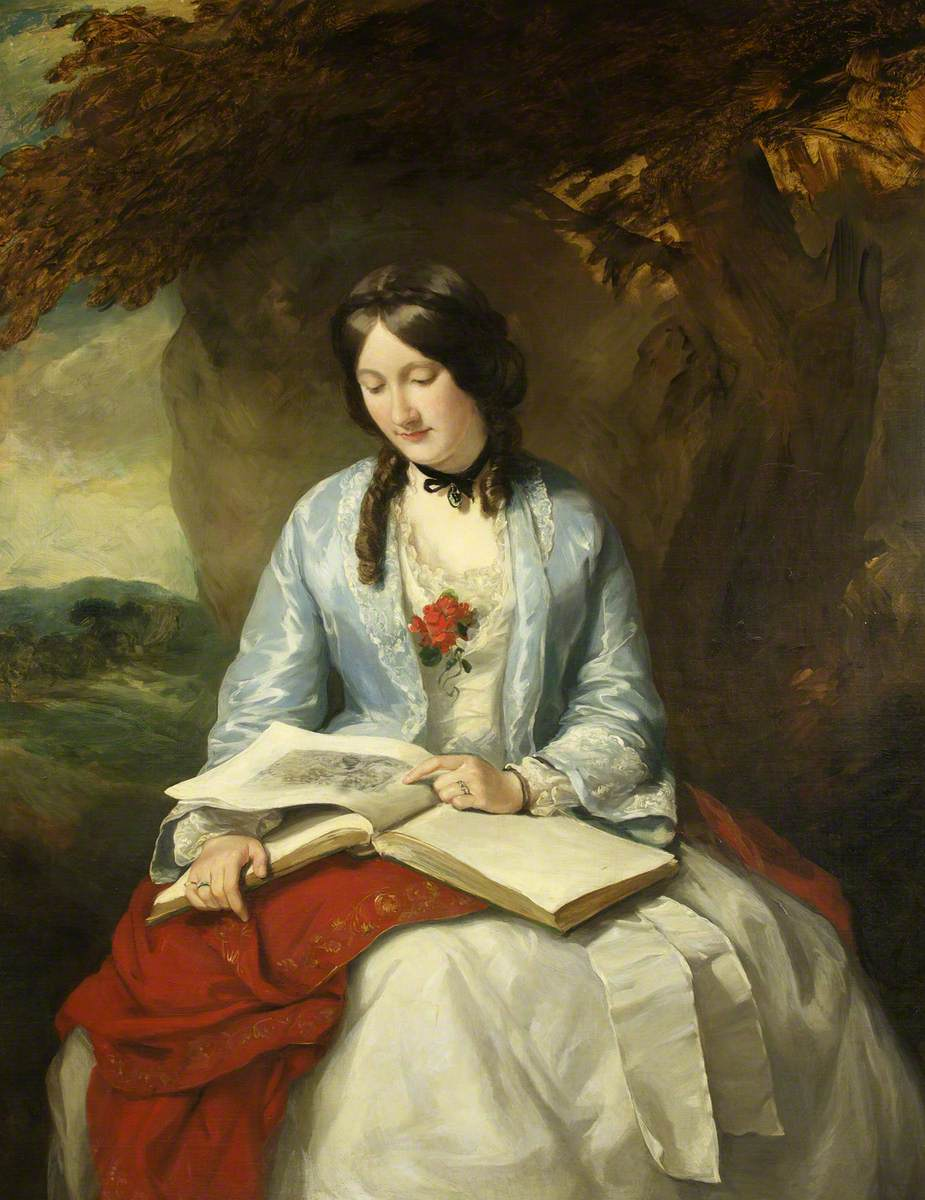
Mrs Livesay by Francis Grant

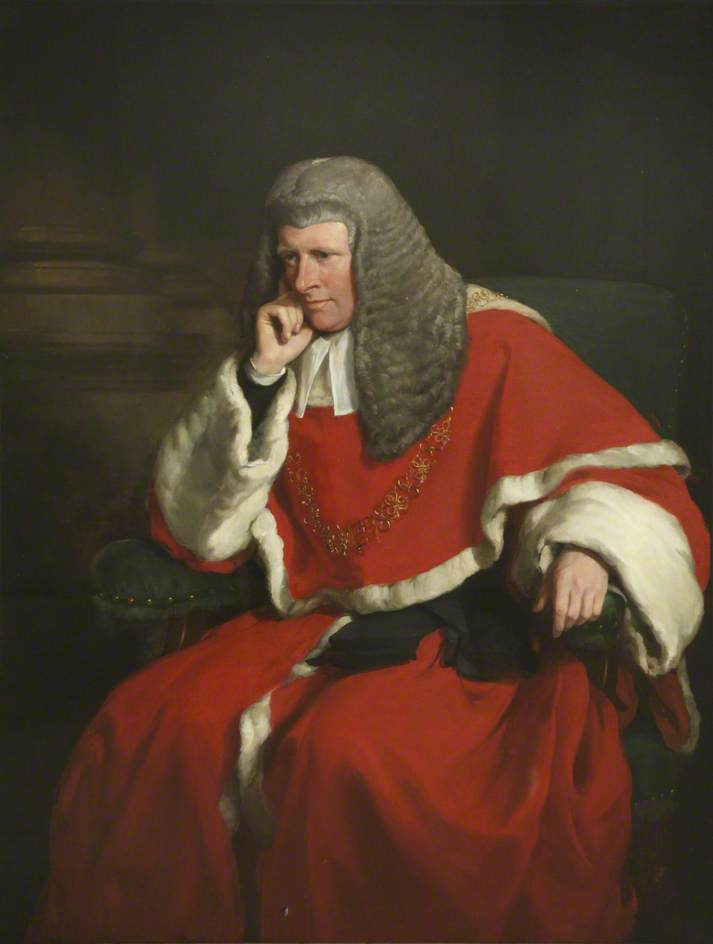
William Erle by Francis Grant

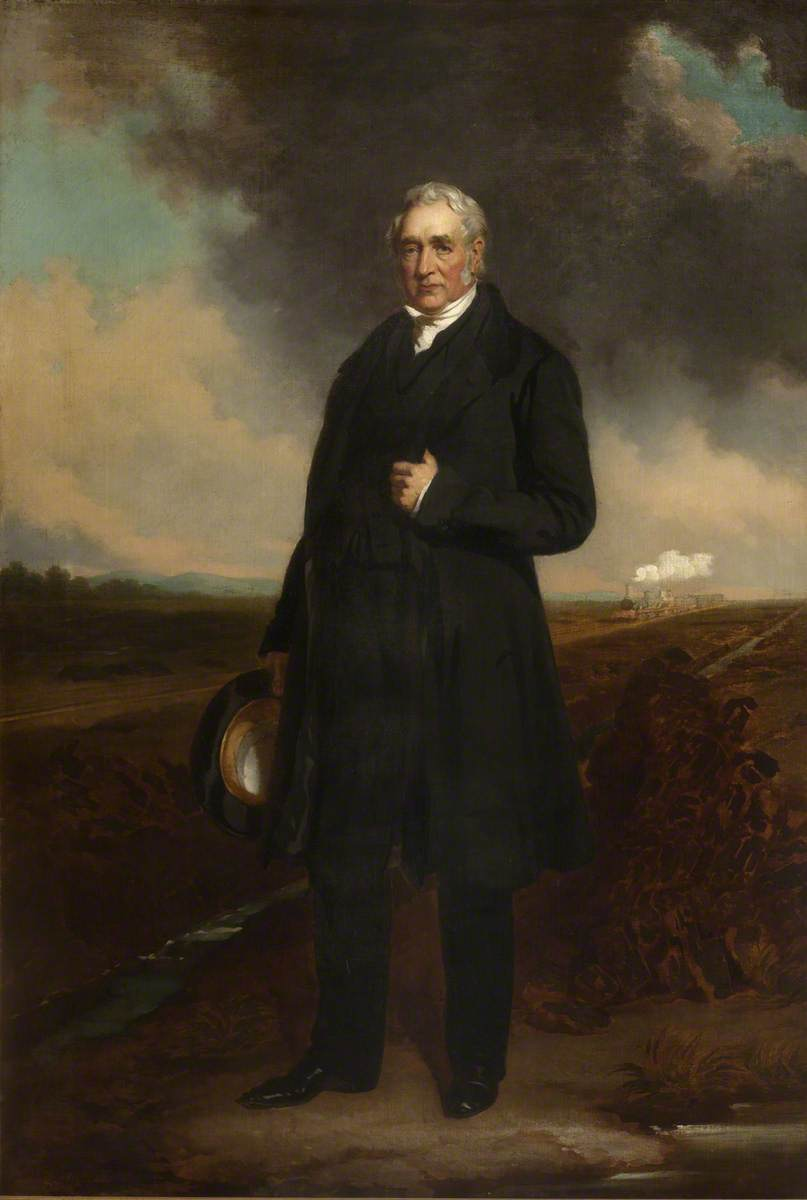
George Stephenson by John Lucas

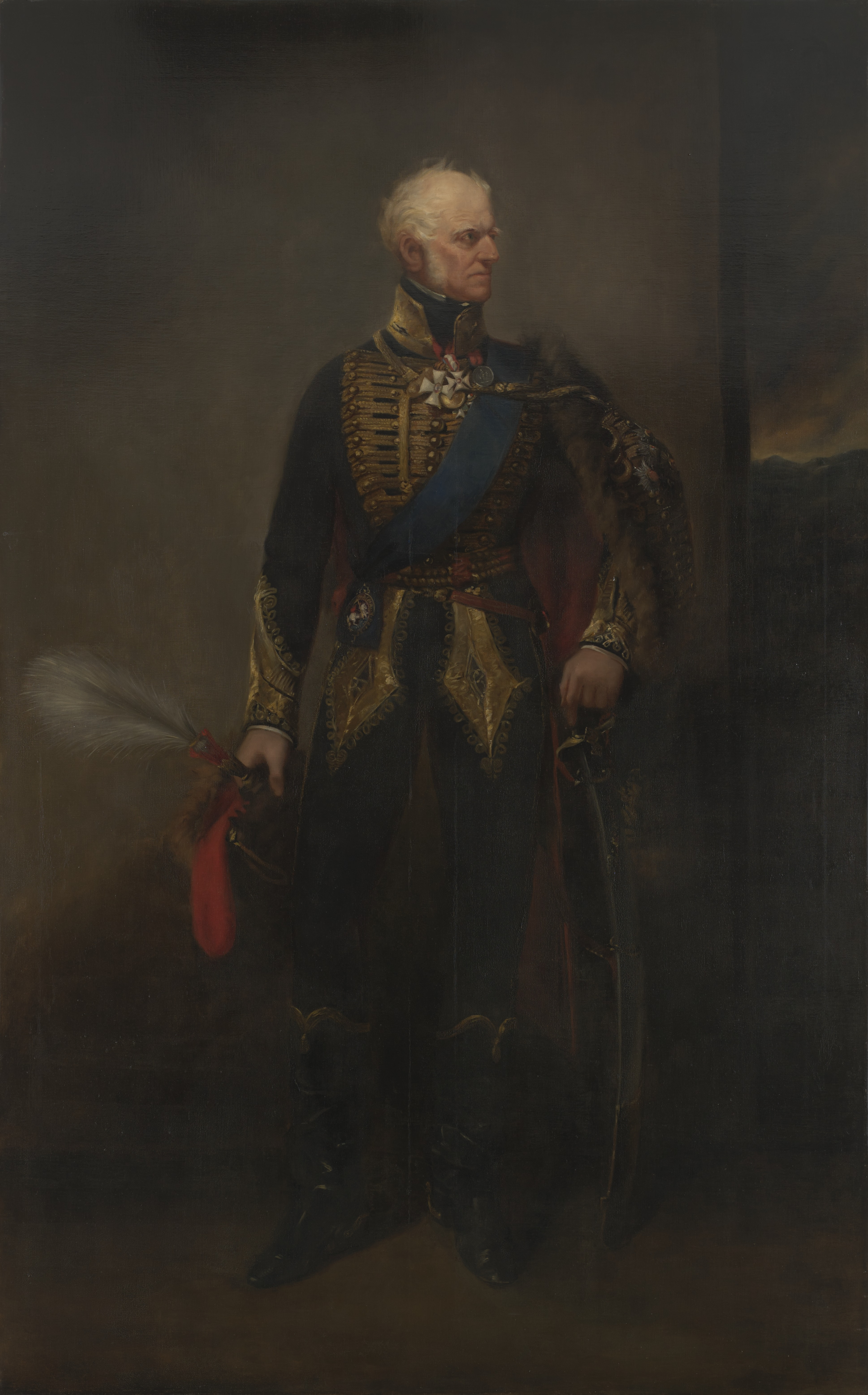
Marquess of Anglesey by Henry Richard Graves

== Bibliography ==
- Baetjer, Katharine (2009). British Paintings in the Metropolitan Museum of Art, 1575-1875. Metropolitan Museum of Art. ISBN 978-1-58839-348-7.
- Huckvale, David (11 December 2015). A Dark and Stormy Oeuvre: Crime, Magic and Power in the Novels of Edward Bulwer-Lytton. McFarland. ISBN 978-1-4766-2279-8.
- Stanfield, Clarkson (1979). The Spectacular Career of Clarkson Stanfield, 1793-1867: Seaman, Scene-painter, Royal Academician. Tyne and Wear County Council Museums. ISBN 978-0-905974-03-3.
