= Trajan's Arch, Ancona =

Painting by Clarkson Stanfield

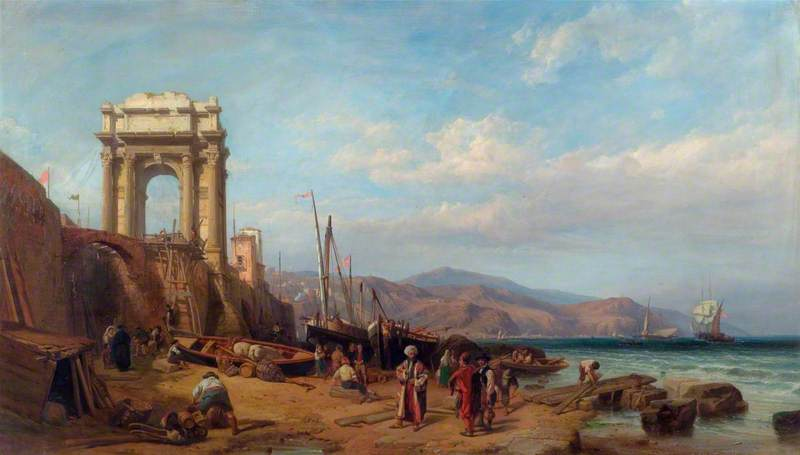
- Artist: Clarkson Stanfield
- Year: 1851
- Type: Oil on canvas, landscape painting
- Dimensions: 90.2 cm × 156.2 cm (35.5 in × 61.5 in)
- Location: Victoria and Albert Museum, London

Trajan's Arch, Ancona is an 1851 landscape painting by the British artist Clarkson Stanfield . It portrays a view on the Adriatic coast of Italy near Ancona. Prominent in the foreground is Arch of Trajan constructed in honour of the Roman Emperor Trajan.

Stanfield, a former sailor, was known for his maritime paintings. He had visited the Adriatic in 1838 and the image was inspired by sketches made in that trip. The work was displayed at the Royal Academy Exhibition of 1851 at the National Gallery in Trafalgar Square. Today it is in the collection of the Victoria and Albert Museum in South Kensington, having been acquired in 1876.

Stanfield had displayed a very similar painting (now lost) at the Royal Academy's Summer Exhibition of 1845. It was hung between two whaling paintings produced by Stanfield's friend J.M.W. Turner. Critics attacking Turner for his proto-Impressionistic style had used Stanfield's painting as a foil for Turner in their claim for what a seascape should look like.

== Bibliography ==
- Hokanson, Alison . Turner's Whaling Pictures" The Metropolitan Museum of Art Bulletin, v. 73, no. 4 (Spring, 2016). Metropolitan Museum of Art, 2015.
- Parkinson, Ronald. Catalogue of British Oil Paintings 1820-1860. Victoria and Albert Museum, 1990.
- Van der Merwe, Pieter & Took, Roger. The Spectacular career of Clarkson Stanfield. Tyne and Wear County Council Museums, 1979.
