= Arch of Trajan (Ancona) =

Roman triumphal arch erected in 115

Coordinates: 43°37′31″N 13°30′23.3″E

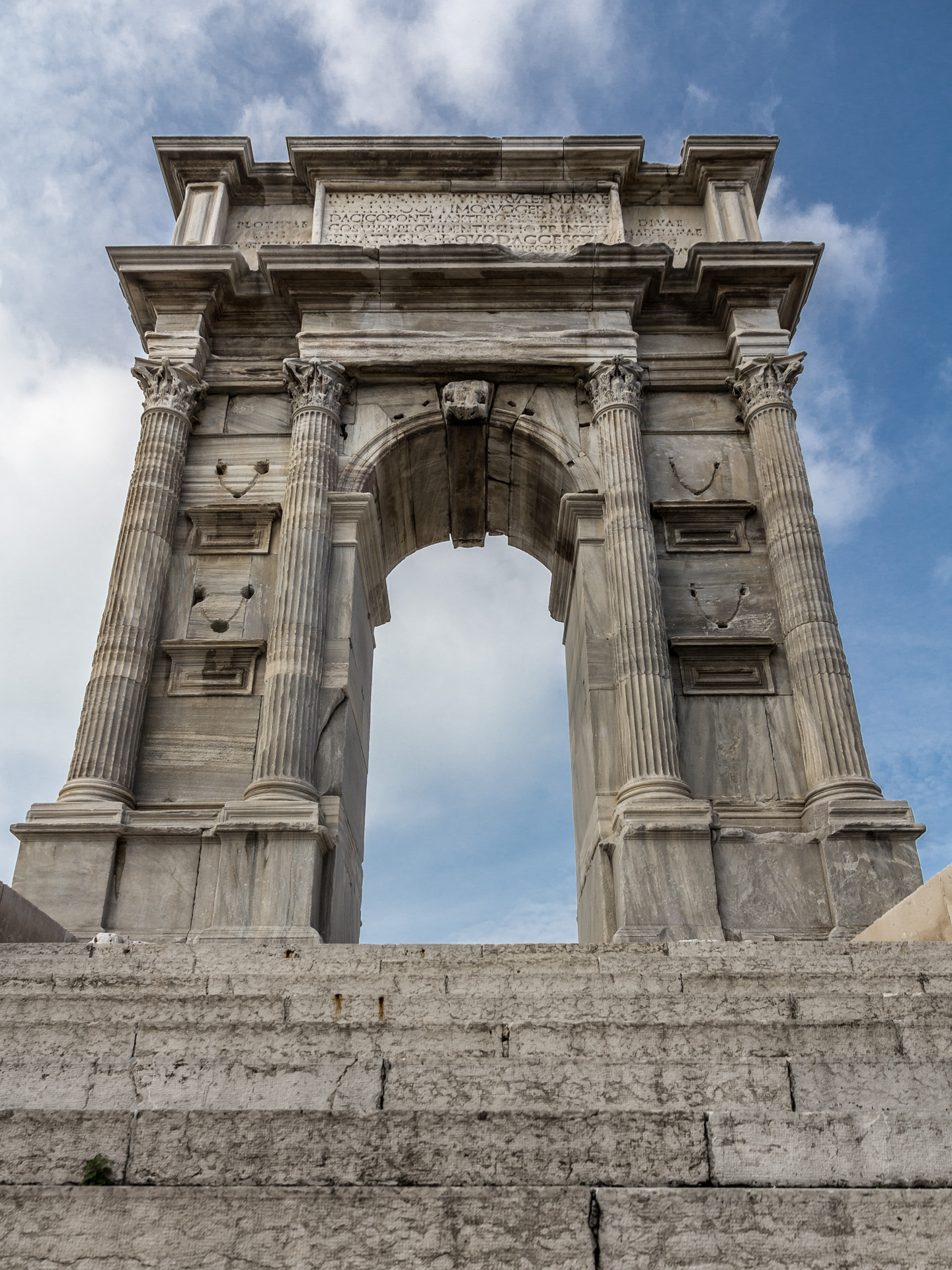
The Arch of Trajan in Ancona

The Arch of Trajan in Ancona is a Roman triumphal arch erected in 115 by the Senate and people of Rome in the reign of Emperor Trajan. It was built in honour of that Emperor after he expanded the port of the city out of his own pocket, improving the docks and the fortifications. It was from here that Trajan departed for the ultimately successful war against the Dacians, an episode which is commemorated in the bas relief of Trajan's Column in Rome.

The arch was the work of the architect Apollodorus of Damascus, born in Roman Syria. Made of marble from the quarries of Marmara Island, it stands 18.5 metres high on a high podium approached by a wide flight of steps. The archway, only 3 m wide, is flanked by pairs of fluted Corinthian columns on pedestals. An attic bears inscriptions. The format is that of the Arch of Titus in Rome, but made taller, so that the bronze figures surmounting it, of Trajan on horseback, his wife Plotina and sister Marciana, would be a landmark for ships approaching Rome's greatest Adriatic port.

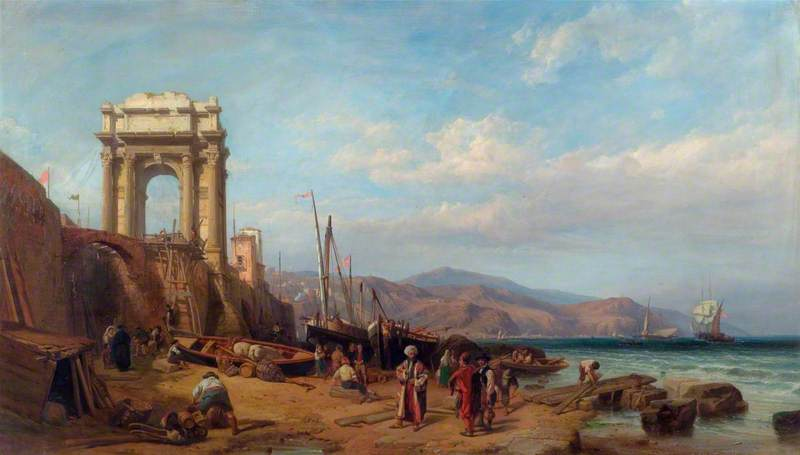
Trajan's Arch, Ancona by the English artist Clarkson Stanfield, 1851

The inscriptions, which remain legible, were gilt in bronze, but this gilding, along with the friezes and the statues were taken by the Saracens in 848. Behind the arch and part of the shipyards, the high tower of Gamba was erected in 950, only to be demolished for use in the construction of the Citadel of Ancona (1532). In 1859, the flight of steps was constructed; the gates about a year after.

The arch remains in good condition and has recently been restored and made fully operational by the removal of the aforementioned gates and received lighting, which raises its profile and enhances its particular position with respect to the historic heart of the city and Guasco hill, where the Cathedral stands.

== See also ==
- List of Roman triumphal arches
