= The Last of the Barons =

1843 novel by Edward Bulwer-Lytton

- Author: Edward Bulwer-Lytton
- Language: English
- Genre: Historical
- Publisher: Saunders and Otley
- Publication date: 1843
- Publication place: United Kingdom
- Media type: Print

The Last of the Barons is a historical novel by the English author Edward Bulwer-Lytton first published in 1843. Its plot revolves around the power struggle between the English King Edward IV and his powerful minister Earl of Warwick, known as "Warwick the kingmaker". The book was released in three volumes by the London publishing house Saunders and Otley. The novel inspired the painting Caxton Showing the First Specimen of His Printing to King Edward IV by the Irish artist Daniel Maclise.

== Plot ==
The King is portrayed as effeminate, capricious and licentious, in contrast with the Earl, shown as a distinguished warrior and politician, great patriot and affectionate father. Other historical figures that appear frequently in the text are the Duke of Clarence, the Duke of Gloucester (the future King Richard III), Marquess of Montagu, and Lord Hastings.

Romance and science in the Middle Ages are the secondary themes of the novel. They are explored through Sibyll, a beautiful young maiden, and her old father, Adam Warner. Sibyll, who is in love with Lord Hastings, is inseparable from her father throughout the story. Adam is a hypomanic natural philosopher working for many years to complete his invention, a mechanical device that is supposed to carry out the functions of a modern steam engine. Persecuted, mistrusted, and misunderstood, he is forced to work as a royal alchemist.

The novel ends tragically with the defeat and death of Warwick at the Battle of Barnet (1471).

== Bibliography ==
- Bryden, Inga. Reinventing King Arthur: The Arthurian Legends in Victorian Culture. Ashgate, 2005.
- Murray, Peter. Daniel Maclise, 1806–1870: Romancing the Past. Crawford Art Gallery, 2009..
