= The Defeat of Shylock =

Painting by James Clarke Hook

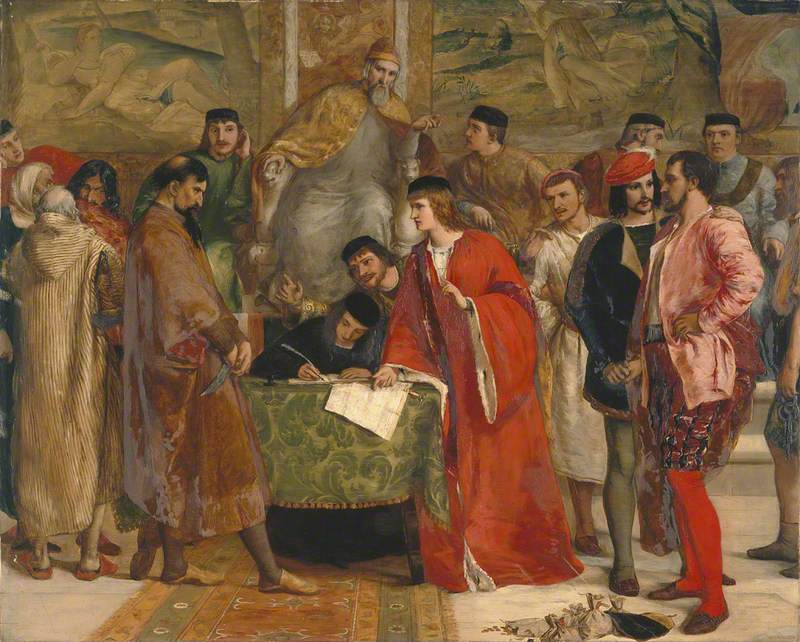
- Artist: James Clarke Hook
- Year: 1850
- Type: Oil on panel, genre painting
- Dimensions: 80 cm × 100.3 cm (31 in × 39.5 in)
- Location: Manchester Art Gallery, Greater Manchester

The Defeat of Shylock is an oil painting on panel by the British artist James Clarke Hook, from 1850. It depicts a scene from William Shakespeare's Elizabethan play The Merchant of Venice. The moneylender Shylock is outwitted by Portia, disguised as a lawyer, during the trial scene.

Hook was a student at the Royal Academy Schools and was awarded a travelling scholarship in 1846 to Italy where he spent three years studying art. He was heavily influenced influenced by traditional Venetian painting. This was one of a series of pictures he produced on his return that paid homage to their style. The frieze-like layout has also been compared to the contemporary Pre-Raphaelite Brotherhood with whom his work shared features.

The painting was displayed at the Royal Academy Exhibition of 1851 held at the National Gallery, in London. Today it is part of the Manchester Art Gallery, having been part of the bequest of Joseph Whitworth in 1896.

== Bibliography ==
- McMaster, Juliet. James Clarke Hook: Painter of the Sea. McGill-Queen's University Press, 2023.
