= Oxwich Bay (painting) =

Painting by Clarkson Stanfield

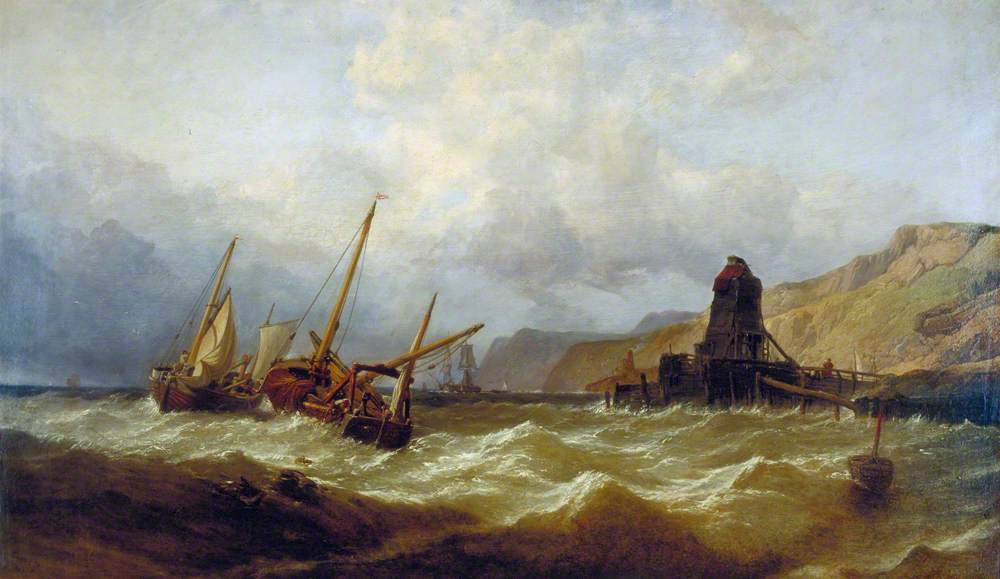
- Artist: Clarkson Stanfield
- Year: 1851
- Type: Oil on canvas, landscape painting
- Dimensions: 74 cm × 125 cm (29 in × 49 in)
- Location: Guildhall Art Gallery, London

Oxwich Bay is an 1851 landscape painting by the British artist Clarkson Stanfield. It features a view of Oxwich Bay on the coast of South Wales, by the Great Tor of the Gower Peninsula. Stanfield was a celebrated painter of seascapes during the romantic era, whose works often drew comparisons to his friend J.M.W. Turner.

This painting was displayed at the Royal Academy Exhibition of 1851 at the National Gallery. Acquired by the collector Charles Gassiot, it was lent by him for the Stanfield retrospective at the Winter Exhibition of 1870 at Burlington House. Gassiot bequeathed the picture to the Guildhall Art Gallery in 1902.

== Bibliography ==
- Dafforne, James. Pictures by Clarkson Stanfield. Lippincott, 1879.
- Van der Merwe, Pieter & Took, Roger. The Spectacular career of Clarkson Stanfield. Tyne and Wear County Council Museums, 1979.
- Wright, Christopher, Gordon, Catherine May & Smith, Mary Peskett. British and Irish Paintings in Public Collections: An Index of British and Irish Oil Paintings by Artists Born Before 1870 in Public and Institutional Collections in the United Kingdom and Ireland. Yale University Press, 2006.
