= Caxton Showing the First Specimen of His Printing to King Edward IV =

Painting by Daniel Maclise

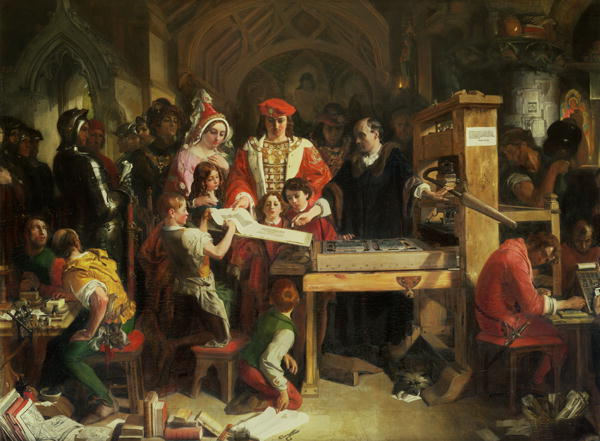
- Artist: Daniel Maclise
- Year: 1851
- Type: Oil on canvas, history painting
- Dimensions: 141.4 cm × 238.2 cm (55.7 in × 93.8 in)
- Location: Knebworth House, Hertfordshire

Caxton Showing the First Specimen of His Printing to King Edward IV at the Almonry, Westminster is an 1851 history painting by the Irish artist Daniel Maclise. It depicts the presentation by William Caxton of the earliest example of printing in England to the reigning monarch Edward IV.

The painting was commissioned from Maclise by John Forster as a tribute to the writer Edward Bulwer-Lytton, inspired by a reference in his 1843 historical novel The Last of the Barons. It was displayed at the Royal Academy Exhibition of 1851 held at the National Gallery in London. Today it is in the collection of Knebworth House, the historic residence of Bulwer-Lytton.

== Bibliography ==
- Huckvale, David. A Dark and Stormy Oeuvre: Crime, Magic and Power in the Novels of Edward Bulwer-Lytton. McFarland, 2015
- Murray, Peter. Daniel Maclise, 1806-1870: Romancing the Past. University of Michigan, 2008.
- Weston, Nancy. Daniel Maclise: Irish Artist in Victorian London. Four Courts Press, 2001.
