= The Battle of Roveredo =

Painting by Clarkson Stanfield

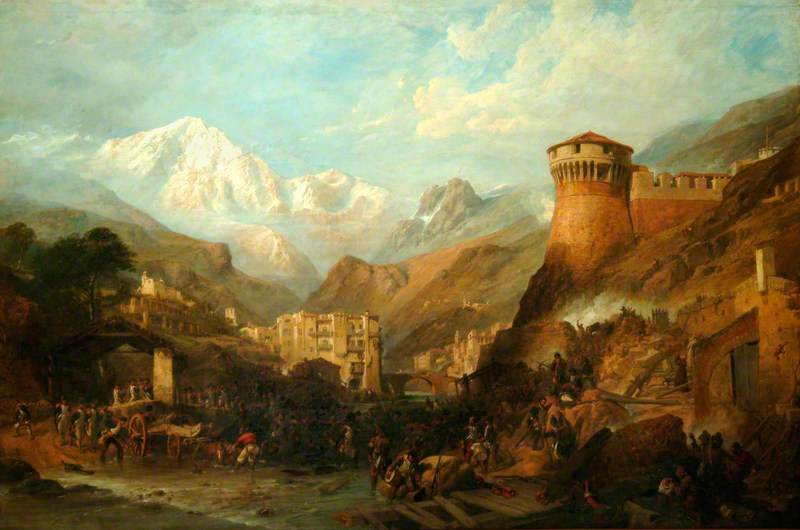
- Artist: Clarkson Stanfield
- Year: 1846
- Medium: Oil on canvas, history painting
- Dimensions: 182.8 cm × 274.2 cm (72.0 in × 108.0 in)
- Location: Royal Holloway., Surrey

The Battle of Roveredo is an 1846 history painting by the British artist Clarkson Stanfield. It presents a battle scene from the French Revolutionary Wars, depicting the Battle of Rovereto fought in Northern Italy in 1796 during the invasion by the French Republic.

Stanfield, a former sailor, was best known for his seascapes including The Battle of Trafalgar (1836). Land battles such as this and The Siege of Sebastian (1855) are rare in his work. The painting was displayed at the Royal Academy Exhibition of 1851 in London and at the Salon of 1855 in Paris. Today the work is in the collection of Royal Holloway, having been acquired by Thomas Holloway in 1881.

== Bibliography ==
- Hichberger J.W.M. Images of the Army: The Military in British Art, 1815-1914. Manchester University Press, 2017.
- Strachan, Edward & Bolton, Roy. Russia & Europe in the Nineteenth Century. Sphinx Fine Art, 2008.
- Van der Merwe, Pieter & Took, Roger. The Spectacular career of Clarkson Stanfield. Tyne and Wear County Council Museums, 1979.
