= Valentine Rescuing Sylvia from Proteus =

Painting by William Holman Hunt

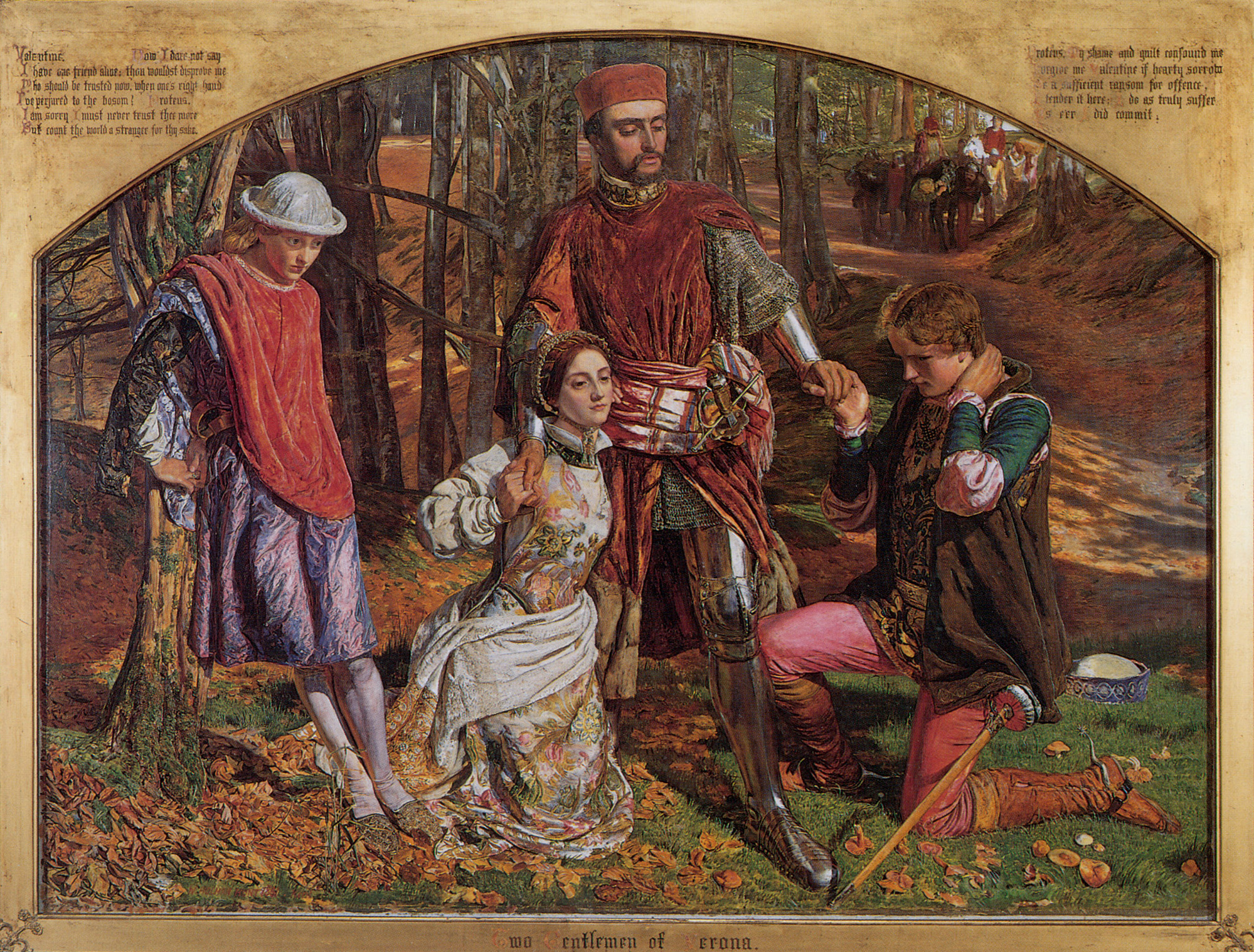
- Artist: William Holman Hunt
- Year: 1851
- Medium: Oil on canvas
- Dimensions: 100.2 cm × 133.4 cm (39.4 in × 52.5 in)
- Location: Birmingham Museum and Art Gallery, Birmingham

Valentine Rescuing Sylvia from Proteus is an 1851 oil painting by the English artist William Holman Hunt. It depicts a scene from William Shakespeare's The Two Gentlemen of Verona. The top left and right portions of the frame include excerpts from act V, scene IV of the play. From left to right, the characters are Julia, disguised as a page, Sylvia, (Note: The model for Sylvia is Elizabeth Siddall.) Valentine, and Proteus, who is in love with Julia. Sylvia's father, the Duke of Milan, and a group of followers are present in the background.

The painting was on display at the Royal Academy in 1851, then was transferred to the Liverpool Academy in 1851. In 1887, the painting was bought by the Birmingham Museum and Art Gallery. As of 2021, the painting is still in their collection.
