= 1785 in art =

Events from the year 1785 in art.

== Events ==
- 27 April – The Royal Academy Exhibition of 1785 opens at Somerset House in London
- April Joseph Wright of Derby holds a one-man exhibition in Covent Garden in London, having severed his official connection with the Royal Academy
- 25 August – The Salon of 1785 opens at the Louvre in Paris

== Works ==
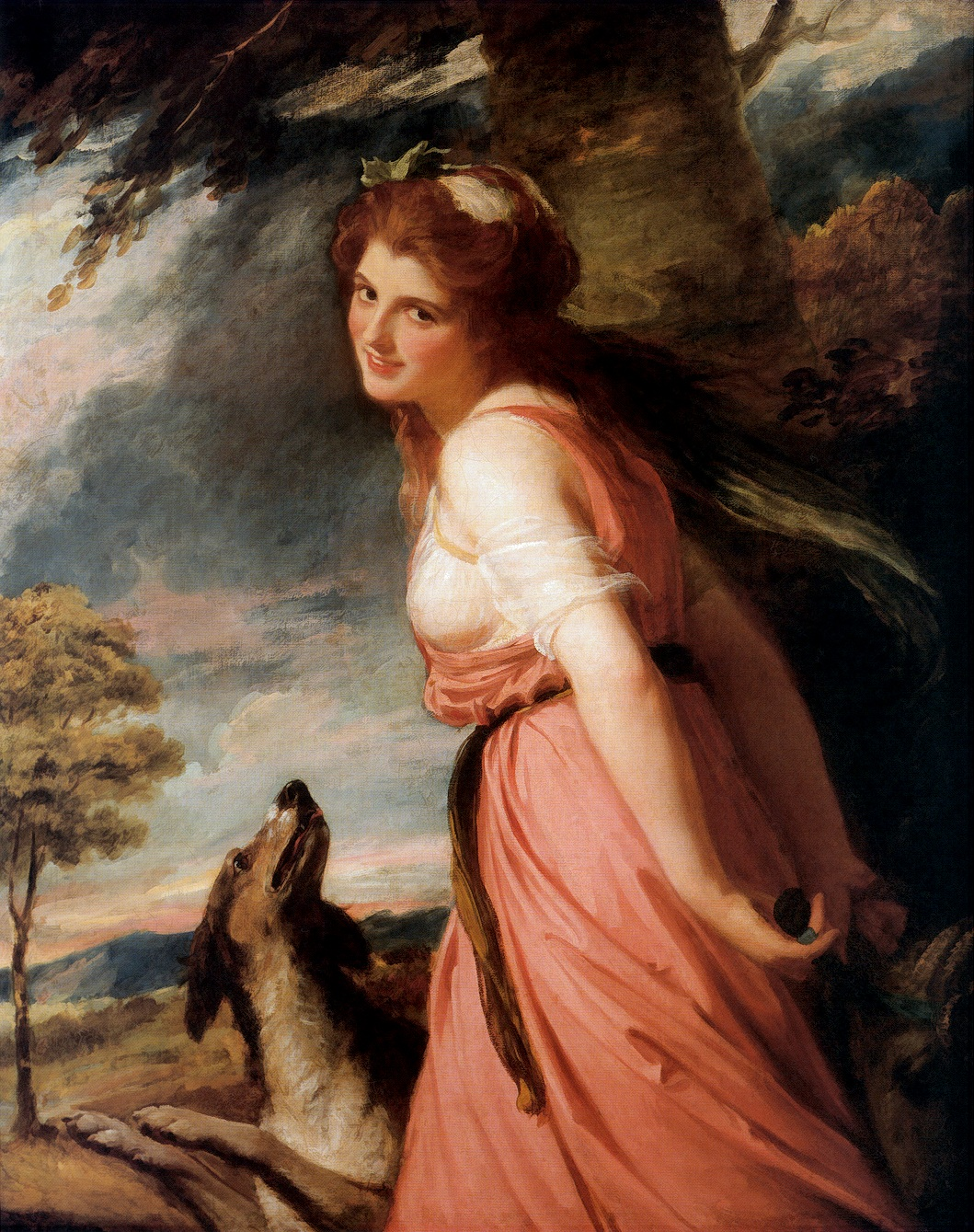
Romney – Emma Hart as a Bacchante

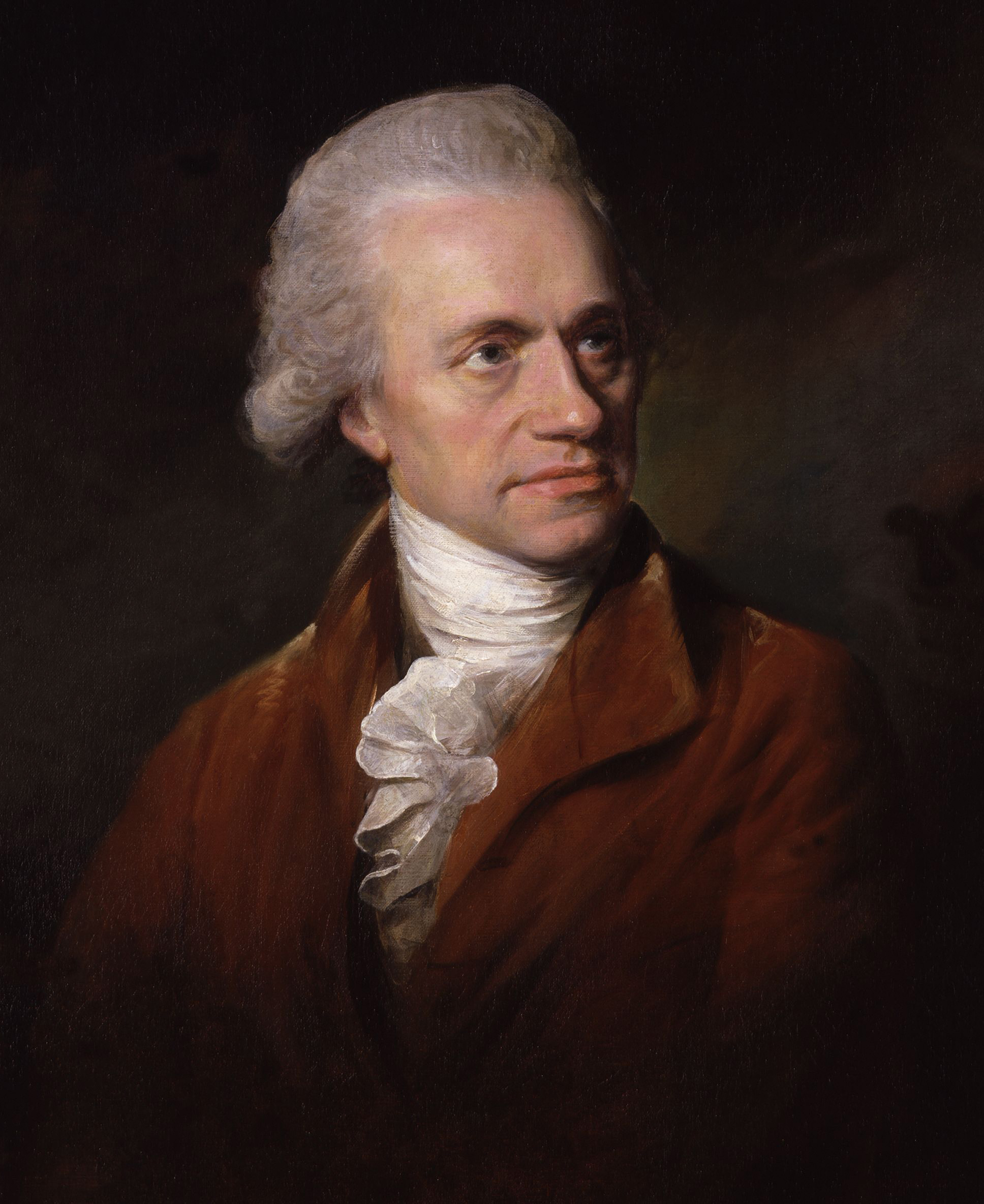
Portrait of William Herschel by Lemuel Francis Abbott

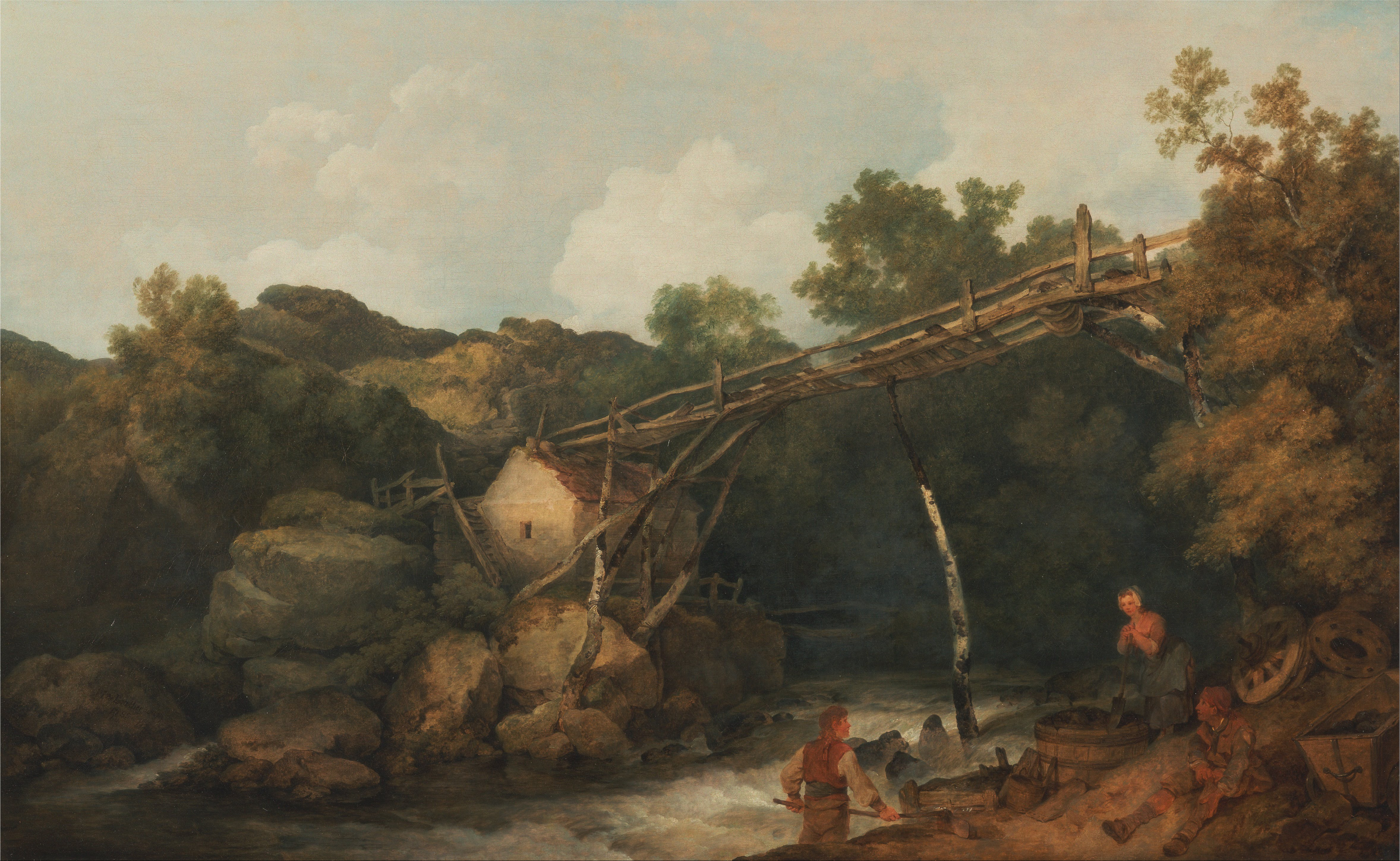
A View near Matlock, Derbyshire by Philip James de Loutherbourg

- Lemuel Francis Abbott – Portrait of William Herschel
- William Beechey – Portrait of Edward Miles
- Nicolas Benjamin Delapierre – Portrait of a Seated Gentleman
- Jean Germain Drouais – The Wounded Warrior
- Joseph Duplessis – Portrait of Benjamin Franklin (approximate date)
- Thomas Gainsborough
  - Mr and Mrs William Hallett ('The Morning Walk')
  - Portrait of Sarah Siddons
- Anton Graff – Self-portrait with his family
- Hugh Douglas Hamilton – Lord Edward Stuart
- Jean-Antoine Houdon – Portrait bust of George Washington
- Adélaïde Labille-Guiard – Self-portrait with two pupils
- Jacques-Antoine-Marie Lemoine – Portrait of Zamor
- Isidro Lorea – Main altarpiece of Buenos Aires Metropolitan Cathedral (carved wood)
- Philip James de Loutherbourg – A View near Matlock, Derbyshire
- Joshua Reynolds –
  - Portrait of James Boswell
  - Miss Theophila Gwatkin as Simplicity
  - Emma Hart as a Bacchante
- George Romney – At least two portraits of Emma Hart
- Alexander Roslin – Self Portrait while Painting the King of Sweden
- Gilbert Stuart
  - Portrait of Benjamin West
  - Portrait of Isaac Barré
- George Stubbs
  - Haymakers
  - Reapers
- Joseph Wright of Derby – The Lady in Milton's Comus

== Births ==
- January 8 – Jan Baptiste de Jonghe, Belgian landscape painter (died 1844)
- April 26 – John James Audubon, Haitian-born American naturalist and painter (died 1851)
- September 1 – José Gil de Castro, Afro-Peruvian painter especially of portraits of Peru's heroes (died c. 1841)
- September 26 – Charles Bird King, American portrait artist who notably paints Native American delegates visiting Washington, D.C. (died 1862)
- October 12 – Henry Thomas Alken, English engraver, illustrator and sporting artist (died 1851)
- October 31 – Georg Friedrich Kersting, German painter of Biedermeier-style interior paintings (died 1847)
- November 18 – David Wilkie, Scottish painter and engraver (died 1841)
- December 1 – Abraham Constantin, Swiss enamel painter (died 1851)
- December 23 – Christian Gobrecht, American engraver (died 1844)
- December 30 – Edouard Pingret, French painter and lithographer (died 1869)
- date unknown
  - Pál Balkay, Hungarian painter and teacher (died 1846)
  - Daniel Havell, English engraver (died 1822)
  - Ignatius Josephus van Regemorter, Flemish historical, landscape and genre painter and engraver (died 1873)
- probable – Bernardo Consorti, Italian line-engraver (died unknown)

== Deaths ==
- January 2 – Andrés de la Calleja, Spanish painter (born 1705)
- April 13 – Michel-François Dandré-Bardon, French historical painter and etcher (born 1700)
- May 8 – Pietro Longhi, Venetian painter (born 1701)
- August 20 – Jean-Baptiste Pigalle, French sculptor (born 1714)
- October 4 – Alexander Runciman, Scottish painter (born 1736)
- October 19 – Hugues Taraval, French painter (born 1729)
- December 14 – Giovanni Battista Cipriani, Italian painter and engraver (born 1727)
- date unknown
  - John Hodges Benwell, English genre painter (born 1764; consumption)
  - Johannes de Bosch, Dutch painter, engraver and draughtsman (born 1713)
  - William Cochran, Scottish painter (born 1738)
  - Pietro Gaspari, Italian artist, known for veduta and capriccio in etchings and paintings (born 1720)
  - Jacques Fabien Gautier d'Agoty, French painter and printmaker (born 1716)
  - Jean-Baptiste Le Paon, French battle scene painter (born 1736/38)
  - José Luzán, Spanish Baroque painter (born 1710)
  - Krzysztof Perwanger, Polish sculptor and mayor (born 1700)
