= 1851 in art =

Events from the year 1851 in art.

== Events ==
- March – English sculptor Frederick Scott Archer makes public the wet plate collodion photographic process.
- May 1 – The Great Exhibition opens at Crystal Palace, London. Works of art on display include the Tara Brooch, handicrafts and ornaments by the Sindhis, an electrotype of John Evan Thomas' sculpture Death of Tewdric Mawr, King of Gwent, and a demonstration by makers of Bristol blue glass.
- May 5 – The Royal Academy Exhibition of 1851 opens at the National Gallery in London
- Pinacoteca Tosio Martinengo opens in Brescia, Italy.
- Missions Héliographiques established by Prosper Mérimée to photograph historical French architecture.

== Works ==
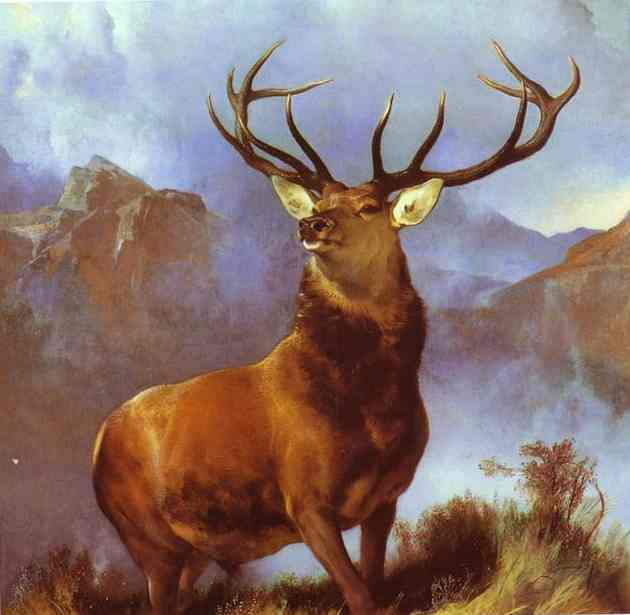
Landseer – Monarch of the Glen

- Edward Hodges Baily – Peel Memorial, Bury (sculpture)
- John Bell – sculptures at The Great Exhibition
  - Andromeda
  - The Eagle Slayer (cast iron)
  - Una and the Lion
- Charles Allston Collins
  - Convent Thoughts
  - May, in the Regent's Park
- Jean-Baptiste-Camille Corot – La Danse des Nymphes
- William Dyce – King Lear and the Fool in the Storm
- William Powell Frith – Hogarth Brought Before the Governor of Calais as a Spy
- Jean-Léon Gérôme - Black Panther Stalking a Herd of Deer
- Francesco Hayez
  - Antonietta Tarsis Basilico
  - Matilde Juva-Branca
  - Meditation (second version)
- William Holman Hunt – The Hireling Shepherd
- Eugène Isabey – Boats on the Shore at Calais
- John Prescott Knight – Portrait of Charles Barry
- Charles Landseer – Cromwell at the Battle of Naseby
- Edwin Landseer
  - Monarch of the Glen
  - Scene from A Midsummer Night's Dream
- Frederick Richard Lee – Shattered Oak in Bedfordshire
- Emanuel Leutze – Washington Crossing the Delaware
- Daniel Maclise – Caxton Showing the First Specimen of His Printing to King Edward IV
- John Jabez Edwin Mayall – The Lord's Prayer (daguerreotype)
- John Everett Millais
  - The Bridesmaid
  - Mariana
  - The Return of the Dove to the Ark
- Karl Heinrich Möller – Athena Arms the Warrior (sculpture, Berlin)
- Stephen Pearce – The Arctic Council Planning a Search for Sir John Franklin
- Soma Orlai Petrich – The Corpse of Louis II
- Paul Falconer Poole – The Goths in Italy
- Richard Redgrave – The Outcast
- Dante Gabriel Rossetti – Beatrice Meeting Dante at a Marriage Feast, Denies him her Salutation
- Théophile Schuler – The Chariot of Death (painting, begun in 1848)
- Rebecca Solomon – The Governess
- Clarkson Stanfield
  - Oxwich Bay
  - Trajan's Arch, Ancona
- John Thomas – Charity (sculpture)
- Franz Xaver Winterhalter – The First of May 1851

== Publications ==
- John Leech – The Comic History of Rome
- Edward Lear – Journal of a Landscape Painter in Albania
- John Ruskin – Pre-Raphaelitism

== Births ==
- January 17 – A. B. Frost, American illustrator (died 1928)
- January 28 – Andreas Aubert, Norwegian art historian (died 1913)
- February 3 – Wilhelm Trübner, German realist painter (died 1917)
- April 19 – Đorđe Krstić, one of the leading three Serbian Realist painters (along with Uroš Predić and Paja Jovanović) (died 1907)
- July 5 – William Lionel Wyllie, English marine painter (died 1931)
- July 23 – Peder Severin Krøyer, Norwegian painter (died 1909)
- October 2 – Francesco Paolo Michetti, Italian painter (died 1929)
- October 13 – Charles Sprague Pearce, American painter (died 1914)
- November 21 – Leslie Ward ("Spy"), English caricaturist (died 1922)
- December 20 – Thérèse Schwartze, Dutch portrait painter (died 1918)

== Deaths ==
- January 9
  - Michel Martin Drolling, French painter of history and portraits (born 1789)
  - Johannes Hermanus Koekkoek, Dutch painter and draughtsman (born 1778)
- January 27 – John James Audubon, Haitian-born American naturalist and painter (born 1785)
- March 10 – Abraham Constantin, Swiss enamel painter (born 1785)
- April 7 – Henry Thomas Alken, English engraver, illustrator and sporting artist (born 1785)
- April 8 – John Henning, Scottish sculptor and medallist (born 1771)
- July 10 – Louis Daguerre, French inventor of daguerreotype photography (born 1787)
- July 11 – Benjamin Duterrau, French painter and engraver (born 1768)
- October 25 – Giorgio Pullicino, Maltese painter and architect (born 1779)
- October 29 – William Wyon, English chief engraver at the Royal Mint (born 1795)
- November – Willis Buell, American politician and portrait painter (born 1790)
- December 6 – John Buckler, English draughtsman and engraver (born 1770)
- December 19 – J. M. W. Turner, English Romantic landscape painter, watercolourist and printmaker (born 1775)
