= Edward Miles =

Edward Miles may refer to:

- Edward Miles (painter) (1752–1828), English miniature painter
- Edward David Miles (1845–1922), Australian businessman and politician, member of the Queensland Legislative Council
- Edward Miles (Tasmanian politician) (1849–1944), Australian businessman and politician, member of the Tasmanian Parliament
