= Tiszaörs =

- Village
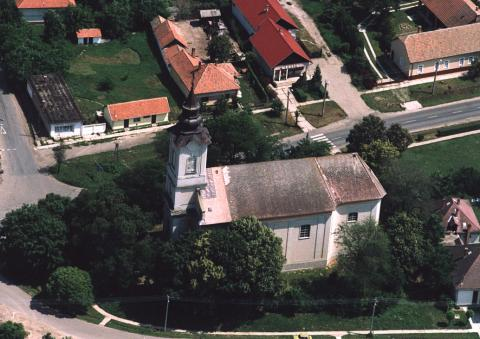
- Church of Visitation in Tiszörs

- Coat of arms

- Location within Hungary
- Coordinates: 47°31′0″N 20°50′0″E
- Country: Hungary
- County: Jász-Nagykun-Szolnok
- District: Tiszafüred

Area
  - Total: 37.10 km^{2} (14.32 sq mi)

Population (2015)
  - Total: 1,379
  - Density: 37.2/km^{2} (96/sq mi)
- Time zone: UTC+1 (CET)
  - Summer (DST): UTC+2 (CEST)
- Postal code: 5362
- Area code(s): (+36) 59

Tiszaörs is a village in Jász-Nagykun-Szolnok county, in the Northern Great Plain region of central Hungary.

== Geography ==
It covers an area of 37.10 km^{2} (14 sq mi) and has a population of 1379 people (2015).

== Tiszaörs bath ==
The alkaline hydrogenated iadous boiling water gushed up in 1932.

== Notable residents ==
- Pál Balkay, painter
