= Hurricane Before Saint Malo =

Painting by Eugène Isabey

- Artist: Eugène Isabey
- Year: 1860
- Type: Oil on canvas, landscape painting
- Dimensions: 107 cm × 156 cm (42 in × 61 in)
- Location: Cooper Gallery, Barnsley

Hurricane Before Saint Malo is an 1860 oil painting by the French artist Eugène Isabey. It depicts a violent storm approaching the port town of Saint-Malo in Brittany as sailors and townsfolk attempt to pull a vessel to safety ashore. Isabey was a Romantic artist known for his expressive views of coastlines and seascapes. He had served as court painter to Louis Philippe I during the July Monarchy. He reportedly claimed this was "the finest marine picture he had ever painted".

The painting was acquired by the British art collector Samuel Joshua Cooper who left it to the Cooper Gallery in Barnsley in his native Yorkshire.

== Bibliography ==
- Leribault, Christophe. Eugène Isabey. Louvre, 2012.
- Martineau, Jane & Foster, Michael. Art Treasures of England: The Regional Collections. Merrell Holberton, 1998
- Miquel, Pierre. Eugène Isabey, 1803-1886. Martinelle, 1980.
