= The Port of Dunkirk =

Painting by Eugène Isabey

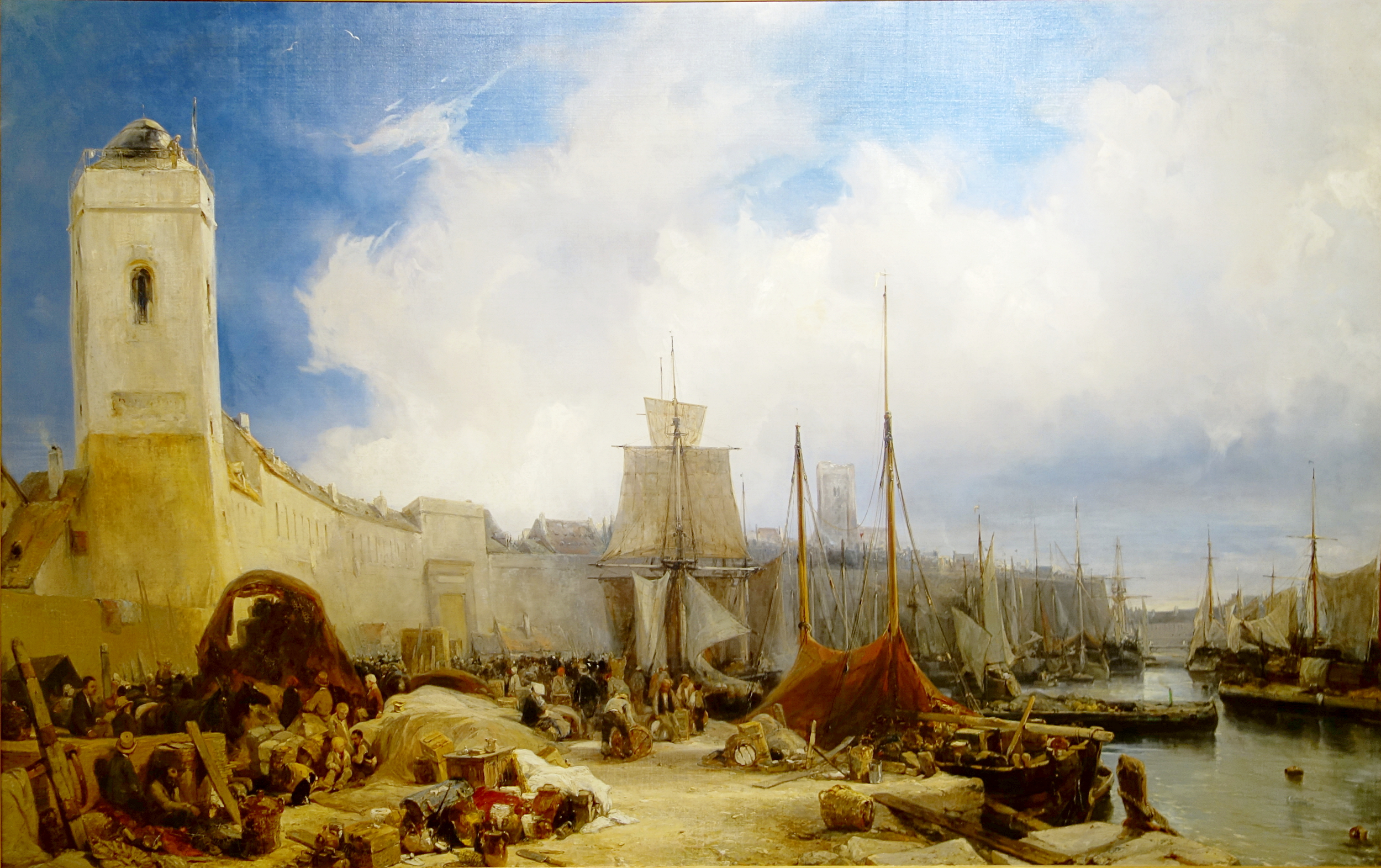
- Artist: Eugène Isabey
- Year: 1831
- Type: Oil on canvas, landscape painting
- Dimensions: 162.2 cm × 260 cm (63.9 in × 100 in)
- Location: Musée des Beaux-Arts de Dunkerque, Dunkirk

The Port of Dunkirk (French: Le port de Dunkerque) is an oil on canvas landscape painting by the French artist Eugène Isabey, from 1831. It depicts a view of the port town of Dunkirk on the North Sea of France close to the border with Belgium. Isabey, the son of Jean-Baptiste Isabey, was known for his romantic landscapes.

The painting was displayed at the Salon of 1831 at the Louvre in Paris. It was purchased from the Salon to hang at the Élysée Palace during the July Monarchy. Today it is part of the collection of the Louvre and on display at the Musée des Beaux-Arts de Dunkerque.

== Bibliography ==
- Leribault, Christophe. Eugène Isabey. Louvre, 2012.
- Miquel, Pierre. Eugène Isabey, 1803-1886. Martinelle, 1980.
- Noon, Patrick & Bann, Stephen. Constable to Delacroix: British Art and the French Romantics. Tate, 2003.
- Richard, Philippe. Autre pareil: carte blanche à Philippe Richard : voyage à travers les collections des musées de Dunkerque. Dilecta, 2012.
