= Pál Balkay =

Hungarian painter and teacher (1785–1846)

Pál Balkay (1785–1846) was a Hungarian painter and teacher. He was born in Tiszaörs and studied in Vienna.

He painted many altar pictures and allegorical compositions on mythological figures and themes including "Leda and the Swan", 1810, and "The House of Peace" in 1820. His well-known works include the portraits of Kazinczy and his wife as well as his self-portrait.

== Gallery ==
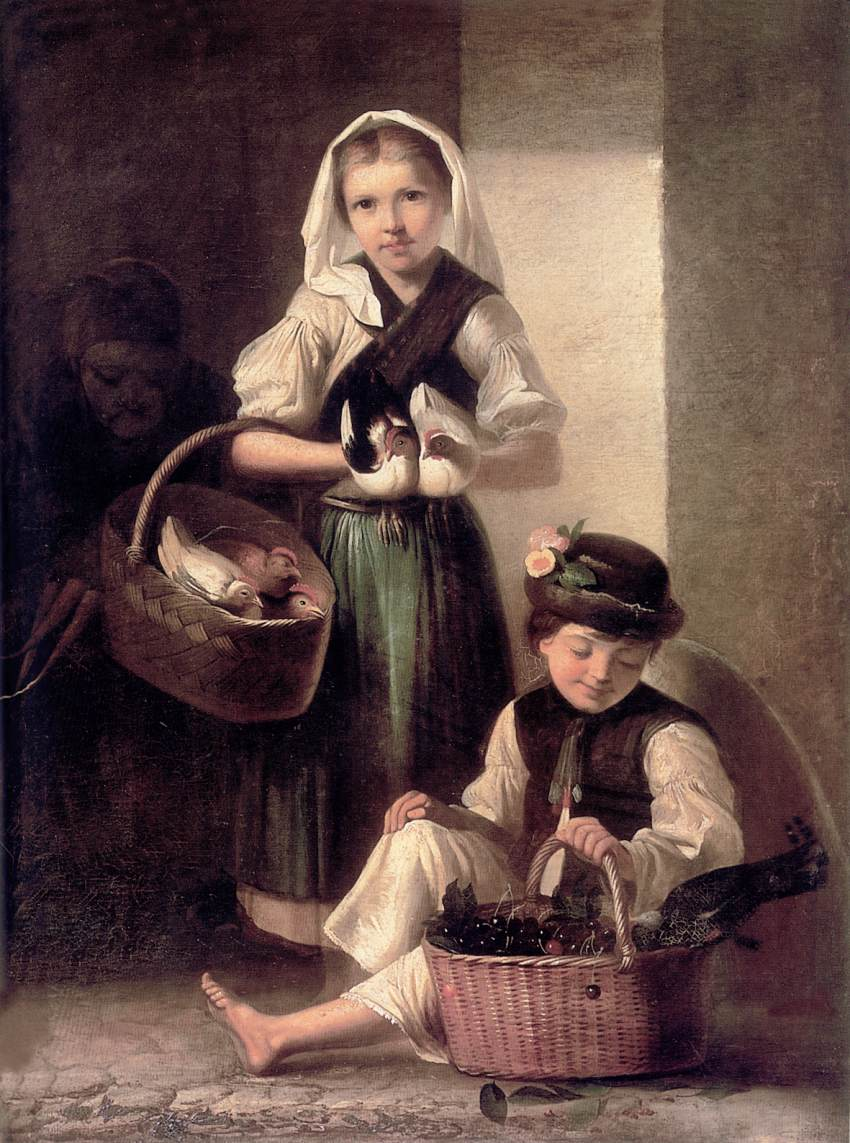
The Sister and Brother

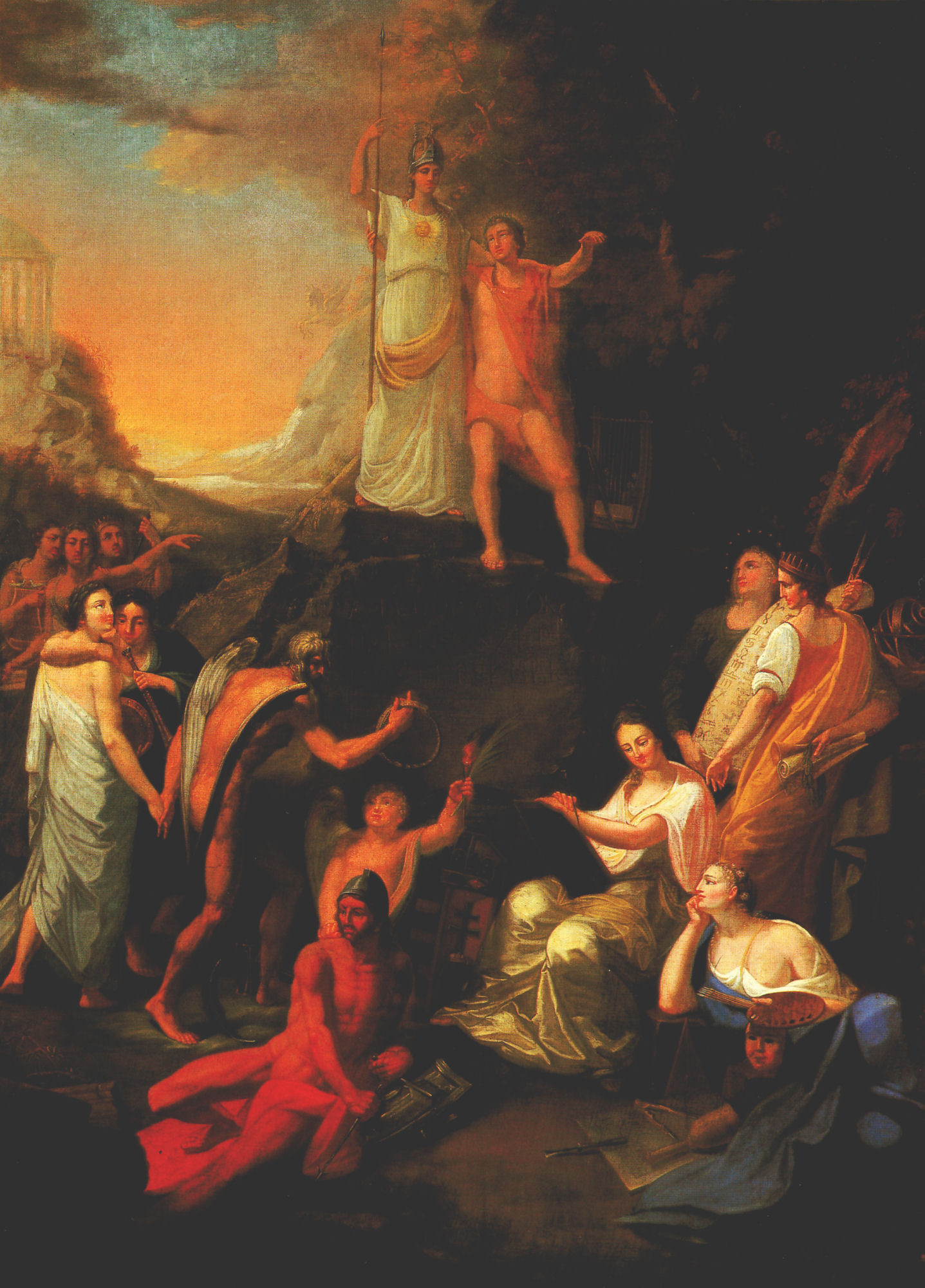
Balkay's 1820 allegorical painting A Tudomány és Szép Mesterségek Emlékezetére
