= Portrait of a Seated Gentleman =

1785 painting by Nicolas Benjamin Delapierre

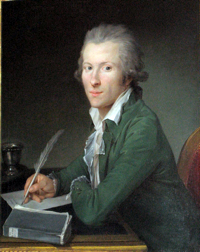
- Artist: Nicolas Benjamin Delapierre
- Year: 1785

Portrait of a Seated Gentleman is a portrait painted by Nicolas Benjamin Delapierre in 1785. Neither the subject nor the provenance before 1928 are known.

== Description ==
The canvas, signed B. N. De La Pierre, is dated 1785 and measures 29-1/2 inches (height) by 24-1/2 inches (width). It shows an 18th-century gentleman sitting at a desk and beginning to write on a single sheet of paper. On the desk in the foreground is displayed a copy of De la Caisse d'Escompte, a financial pamphlet published on 17 May 1785 by the French orator and statesman Mirabeau (Honoré Gabriel Riqueti, comte de Mirabeau). The portrait was painted several years before Mirabeau achieved prominence.

Both the subject of the painting and the pre-1928 provenance are being researched by Omnis, Inc.

== Provenance ==
The provenance before 1928 is unknown.

- 1 October 1928, Ugo Bardini (son of the art collector Stefano Bardini) sells to the art dealer
- 5 March 1929, Thos. Agnew & Sons sells to art collector and New York Philharmonic Orchestra conductor Josef Stransky
- 6 March 1936, passes to Stransky’s widow, Marie Stransky, upon his death
- 16 October 1954, following Mrs. Stransky's death, Parke-Bernet Galleries in New York sells to entrepreneur and art collector, O. Roy Chalk
- 1 December 1995, passes to Claire Chalk upon the death of her husband
- 14 April 1996, Mrs. Chalk sells at auction to an anonymous buyer at C. G. Sloan & Company in Bethesda, Maryland

== Subject ==
Speculation that the painting may depict Mirabeau, the author of the pamphlet, is refuted by comparing the sitter to known images of Mirabeau. Some believe the painting to be the earliest known portrait of Thomas Jefferson.
