= Boats on the Shore at Calais =

Painting by Eugène Isabey

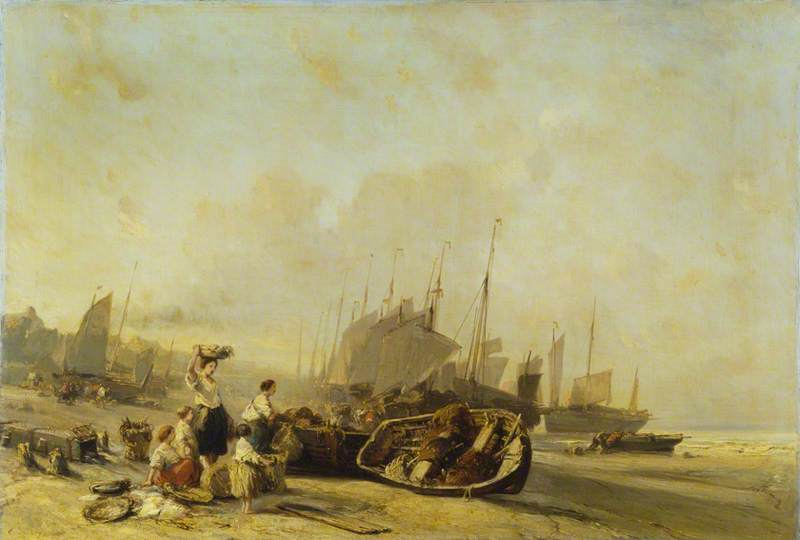
- Artist: Eugène Isabey
- Year: 1851
- Type: Oil on canvas, landscape painting
- Dimensions: 61.5 cm × 90.7 cm (24.2 in × 35.7 in)
- Location: Wallace Collection, London

Boats on the Shore at Calais is an 1851 landscape painting by the French artist Eugène Isabey. It shows a view of the coastline at Calais on the English Channel.

The son of the miniature portraitist Jean-Baptiste Isabey, he was a noted painter of landscapes and maritime scenes. From the 1820s he produced many views on the northern coast of France, that also featured in the paintings of Richard Parkes Bonington and others. Produced in the Romantic style, this is a late example of the genre.

The painting was acquired by the British art collector the Marquess of Hertford in 1863. It now forms part of the Wallace Collection, in London.

== Bibliography ==
- Ingamells, John. The Wallace Collection: French Nineteenth Century. Trustees of the Wallace Collection, 1985.
- Leribault, Christophe. Eugène Isabey. Louvre, 2012.
- Miquel, Pierre. Eugène Isabey, 1803-1886. Martinelle, 1980.
- Noon, Patrick & Bann, Stephen. Constable to Delacroix: British Art and the French Romantics. Tate, 2003.
