= Reapers (painting) =

Painting by George Stubbs

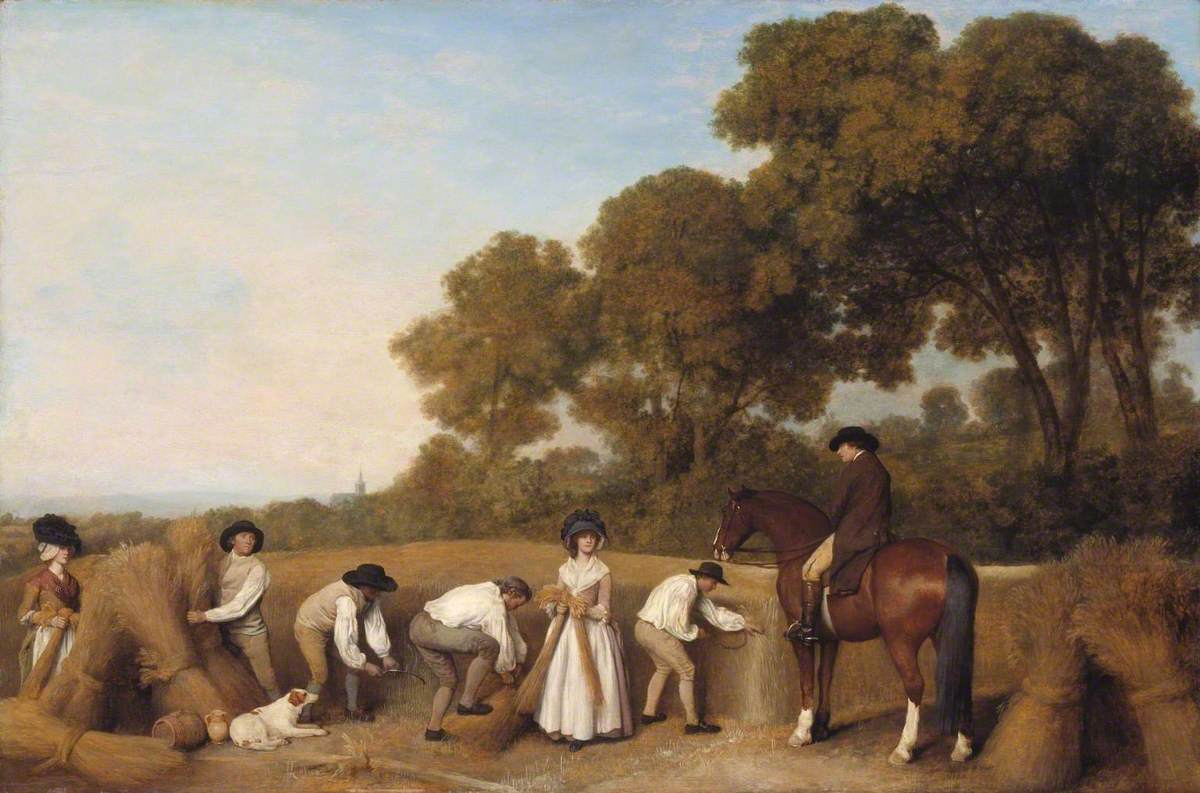
- Artist: George Stubbs
- Year: 1785
- Type: Oil on canvas, genre painting
- Dimensions: 89.9 cm × 136.8 cm (35.4 in × 53.9 in)
- Location: Tate Britain, London

Reapers is an oil painting on canvas by the British artist George Stubbs, from 1785. It is held at the Tate Britain, in London.

== History and description ==
A genre painting, it shows a group of agricultural labourers, four men and two women, harvesting wheat in the English countryside. A man, perhaps the overseer, is seen on a horse talking to them.

A companion piece Haymakers was also produced and the two paintings were displayed at the Royal Academy Exhibition of 1786 at Somerset House, in London. Stubbs also later produced an engraving based on the picture. Today the painting is in the Tate Britain, which purchased it with the assistance of the Art Fund in 1977.

In 1795, Stubbs experimented by producing a version of the scene on enamel, which is now in the collection of the Yale Center for British Art, in New Haven.

== Bibliography ==
- Egerton, Judy. George Stubbs, Painter. Yale University Press, 2007.
- Kidson, Alex. George Stubbs: A Celebration. Tate Publishing, 2006.
