= Edward Miles (painter) =

English miniature painter (1752–1828)

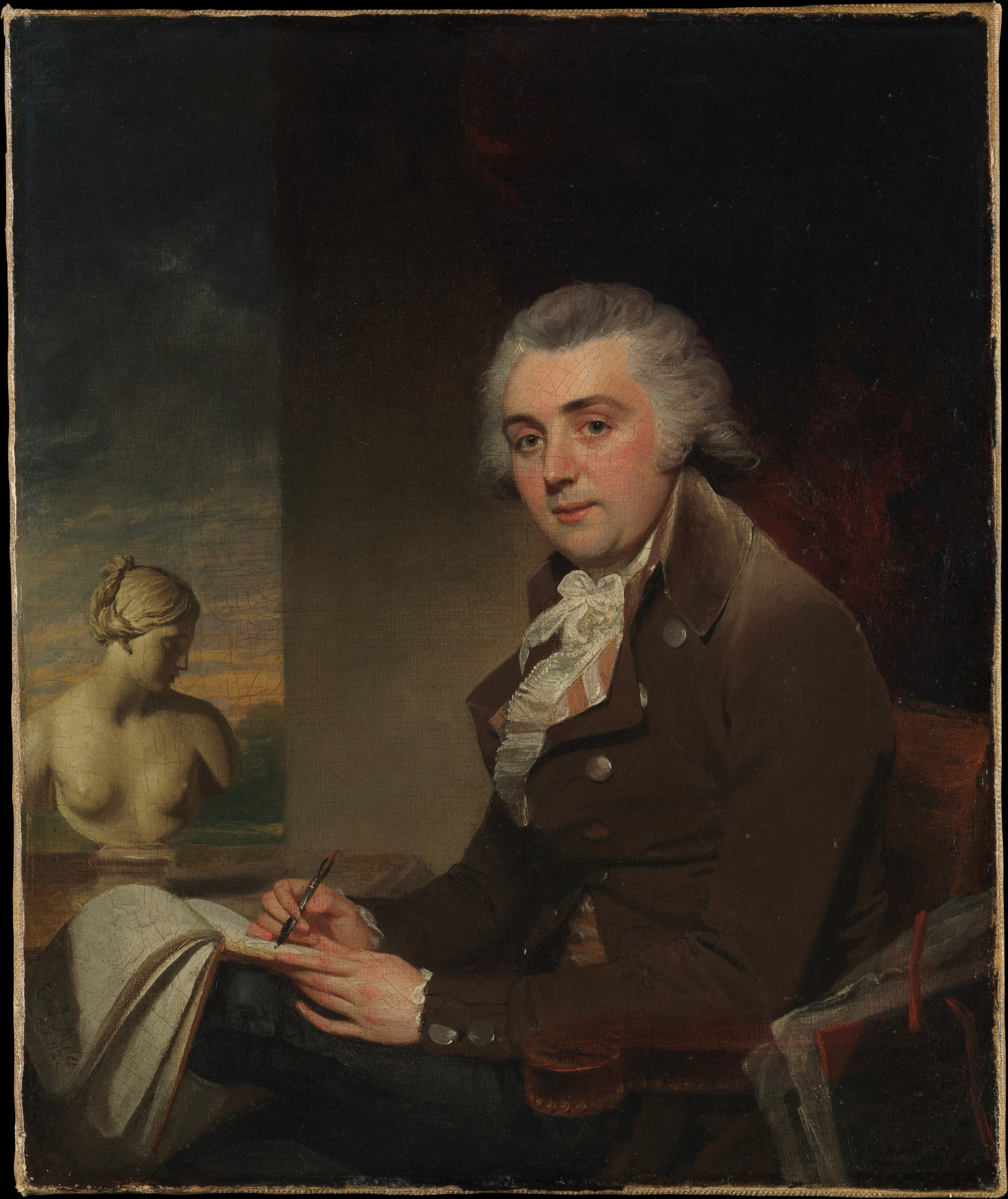
- Portrait of Edward Miles by William Beechey, 1785
- Born: 14 October 1752; Great Yarmouth, Norfolk, England
- Died: 7 March 1828 (aged 76); Philadelphia, Pennsylvania, United States
- Known for: Portrait miniatures

Edward Miles (14 October 1752 – 7 March 1828) was an English miniature painter from Yarmouth. He exhibited at the Royal Academy of Arts from 1775 to 1797, became miniature painter to Queen Charlotte in 1794, and in 1797 moved to St. Petersburg as miniature painter to Czars Paul I and Alexander I. In 1807 he settled in Philadelphia, and died there in 1828.

== Life ==
Edward Miles was born on 14 October 1752. He was a native of Yarmouth, where he began life as an errand-boy to Giles Wakeman, a surgeon in that town. He early showed a talent for drawing, which was encouraged by his master, and after receiving sufficient patronage from friends in Yarmouth, he came to London in 1771. He was introduced to and favourably received by Sir Joshua Reynolds, and copied some of his pictures. Miles quickly obtained some repute as a miniature painter. He first lived in Tavistock Street, Covent Garden, but subsequently removed to Berkeley Street, Berkeley Square, where he obtained much aristocratic patronage. He exhibited at the Royal Academy from 1775 to 1797. In 1792 he was appointed miniature painter to the Duchess of York, and in 1794 to Queen Charlotte, whose portrait he painted. One of his later works was a portrait of the Emperor Alexander of Russia, which was presented to the Earl of Liverpool. Miles paid frequent visits to Yarmouth, and, according to Lionel Cust, died there in 1798. However, more recent sources say he finally settled in Philadelphia in 1807, and died there on 7 March 1828.

== Gallery ==
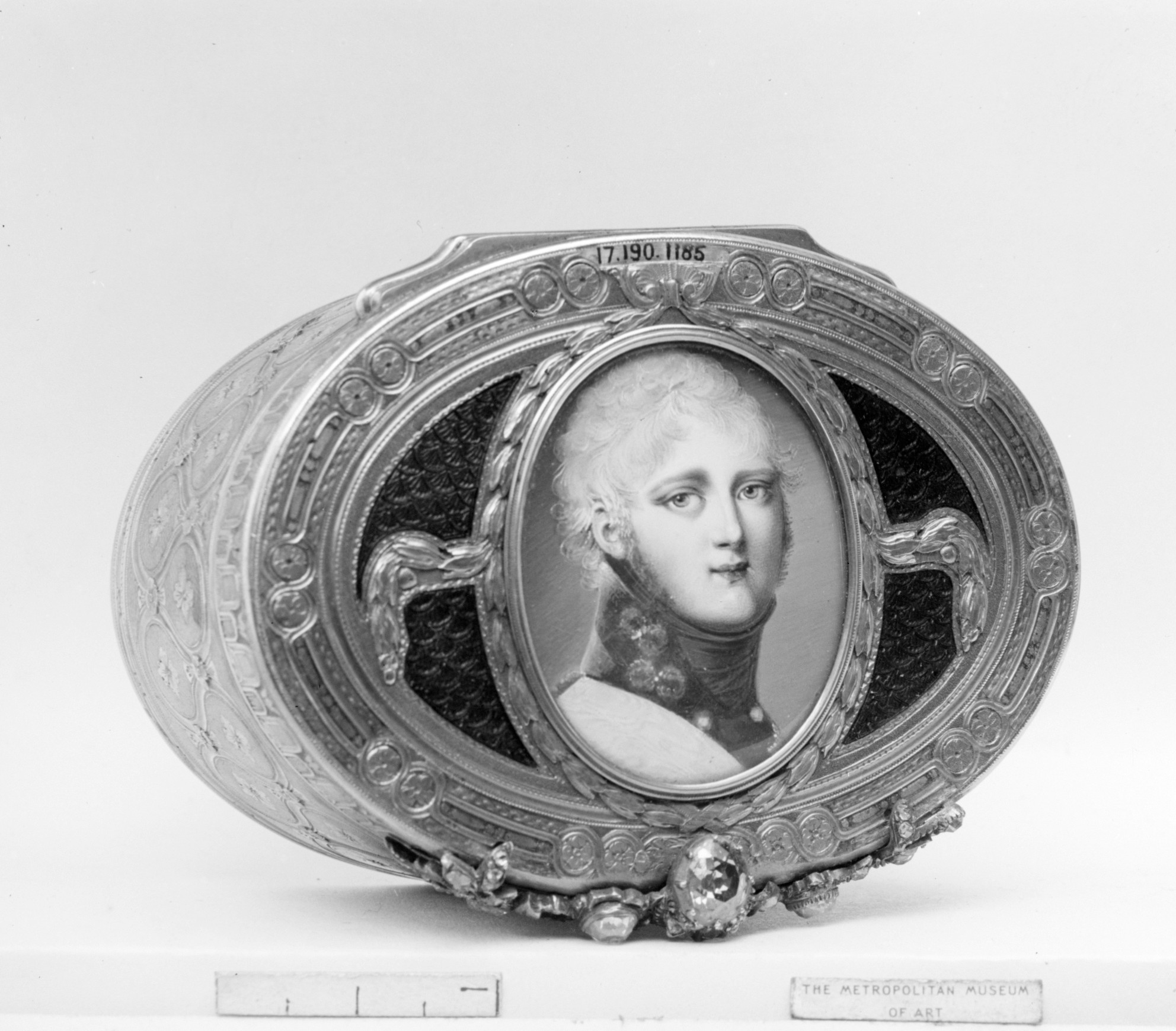
Snuffbox with miniature of Alexander I of Russia (1763–4)

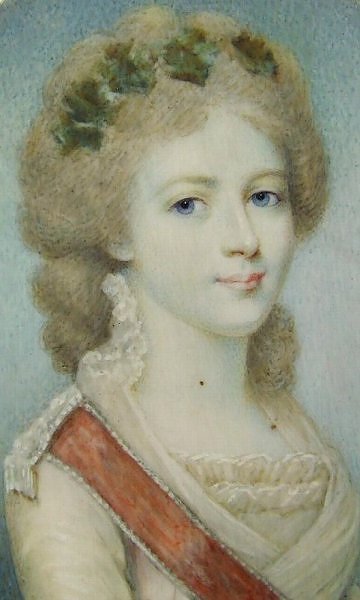
Grand Duchess Alexandra Pavlovna of Russia (1797)

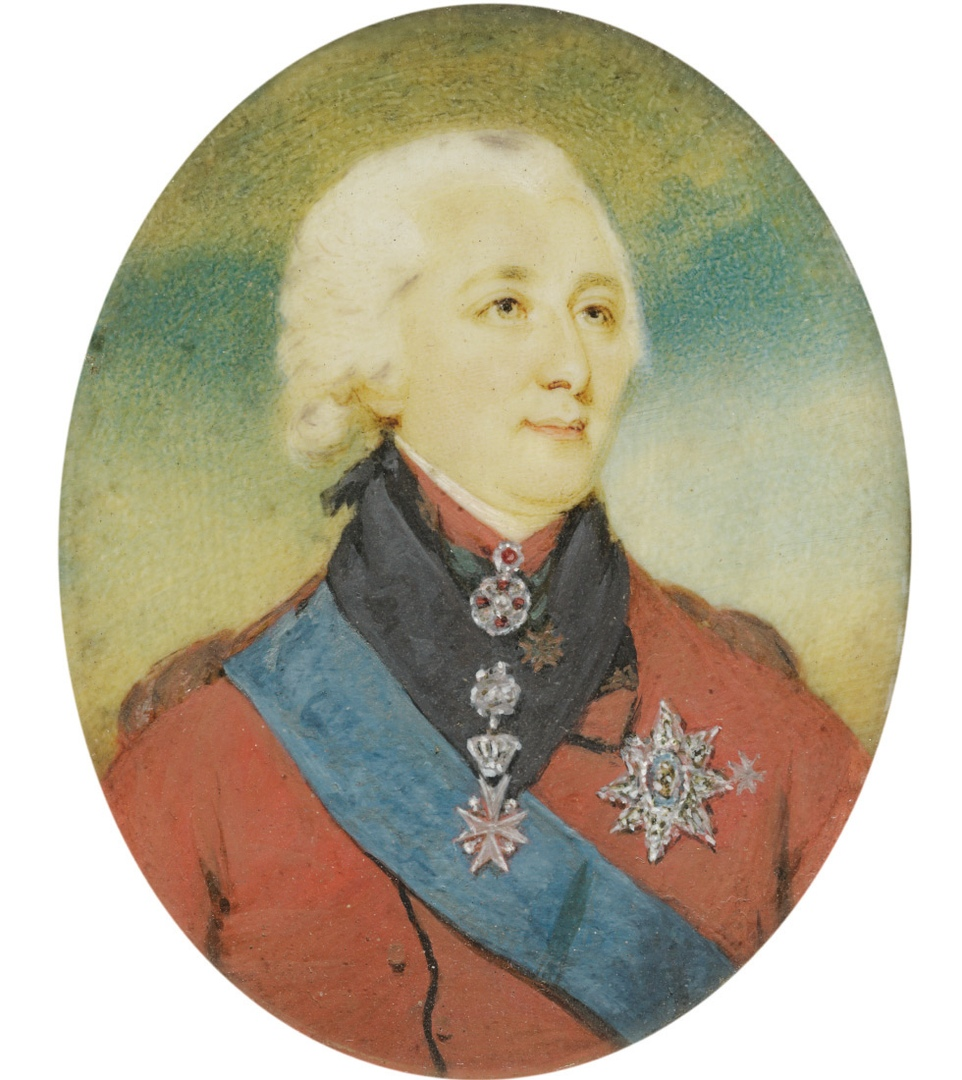
Ivan Pavlovich Kutaisov (1800)

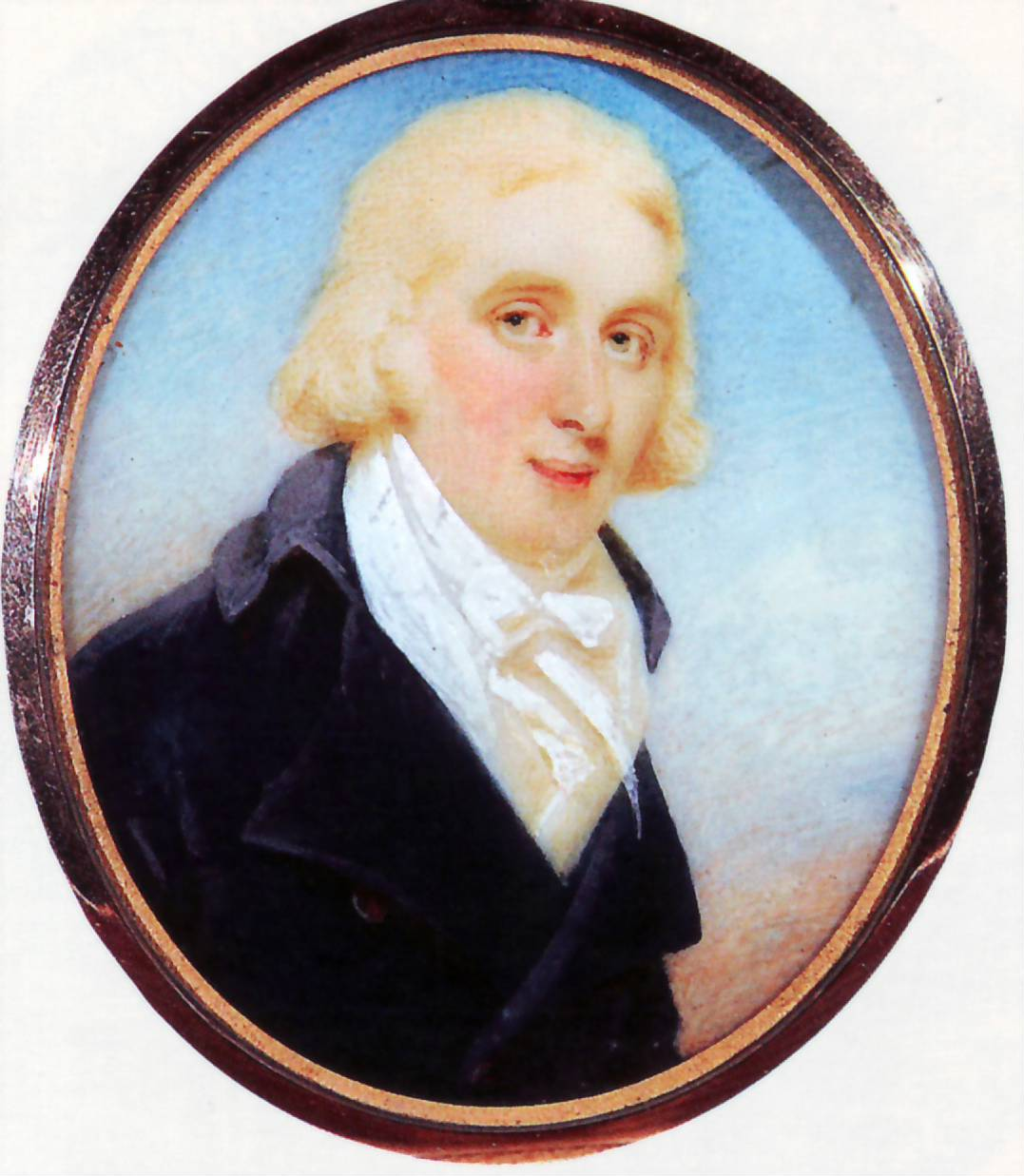
Young man (early 1800s)

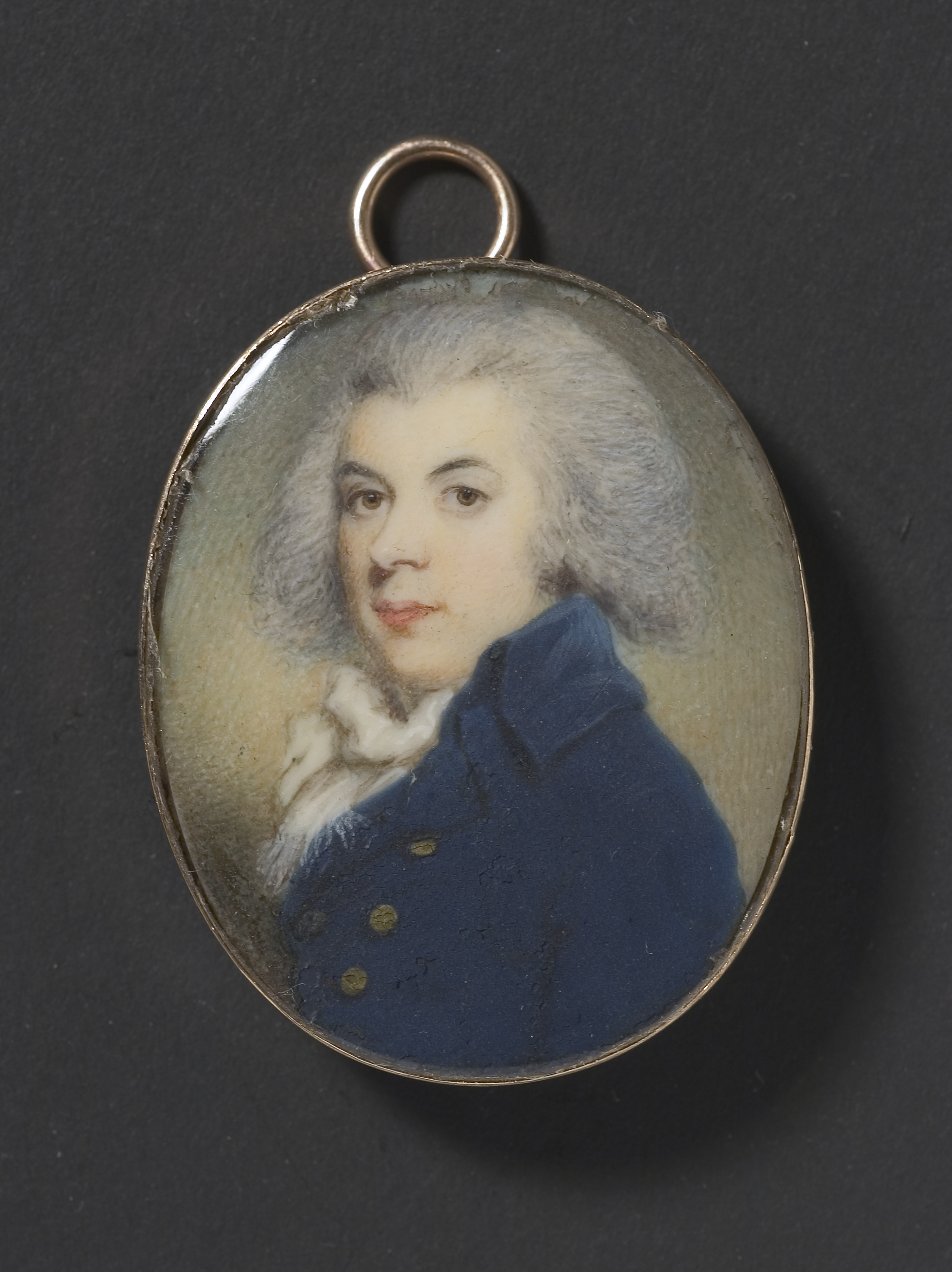
Unknown man

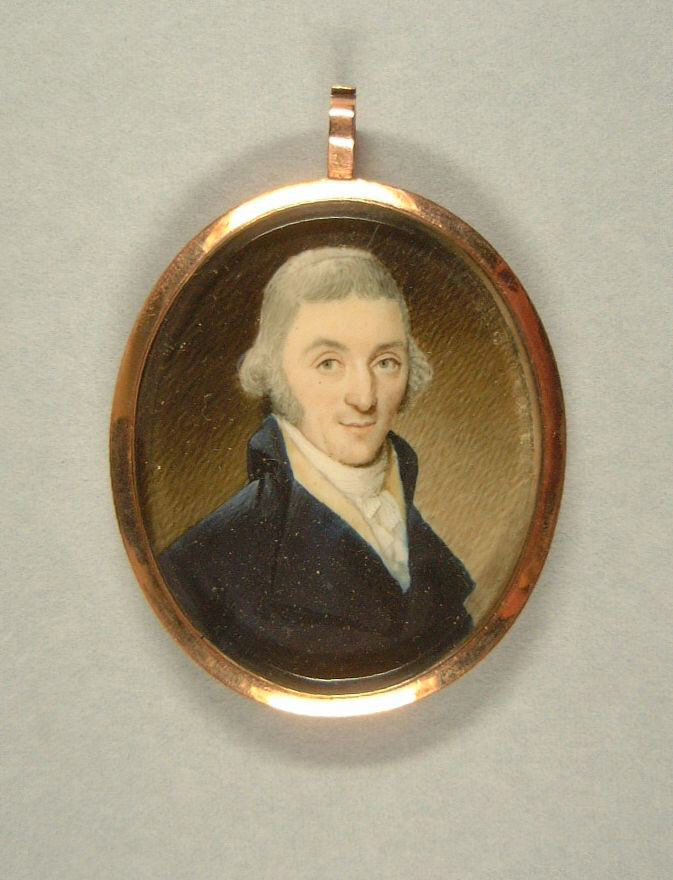
Portrait of a Gentleman

== Sources ==
- This article incorporates text from a publication now in the public domain: Cust, Lionel Henry (1894). "Miles, Edward". In Lee, Sidney (ed.). Dictionary of National Biography. Vol. 37. London: Smith, Elder & Co. p. 377.
- Baetjer, Katharine (Summer 1999). "British Portraits in The Metropolitan Museum of Art". The Metropolitan Museum of Art Bulletin, 57(1): pp. 56–57.
- Baetjer, Katharine (2009). British Paintings in The Metropolitan Museum of Art, 1575–1875. New Haven and London: Yale University Press. pp. 152–153.
- Howard, Jeremy (2004). "Miles, Edward (1752–1828), miniature painter". Oxford Dictionary of National Biography (online ed.). Oxford University Press. doi:10.1093/ref:odnb/18699. (Subscription, Wikipedia Library access or UK public library membership required.)
- Palmer, Charles John (1874). The Perlustration of Great Yarmouth, with Gorleston and Southtown. Vol. 2. Great Yarmouth: George Nall. pp. 412–413.
- Redgrave, Samuel (1874). "Miles, Edward". A Dictionary of Artists of the English School. London: Longmans, Green, and Co. p. 280.
- Reynolds, Graham; Baetjer, Katharine (1996). European Miniatures in The Metropolitan Museum of Art. New York: Harry N. Abrams, Inc. pp. 172–173.
- Walker, R. J. B. (1992). The Eighteenth and Early Nineteenth Century Miniatures in the Collection of Her Majesty the Queen. Cambridge: Cambridge University Press. pp. 136–140.
- "Miles, Edward". Benezit Dictionary of Artists. Oxford Art Online. 2011. Retrieved 20 September 2022.
