= Eugène Isabey =

French painter (1803–1886)

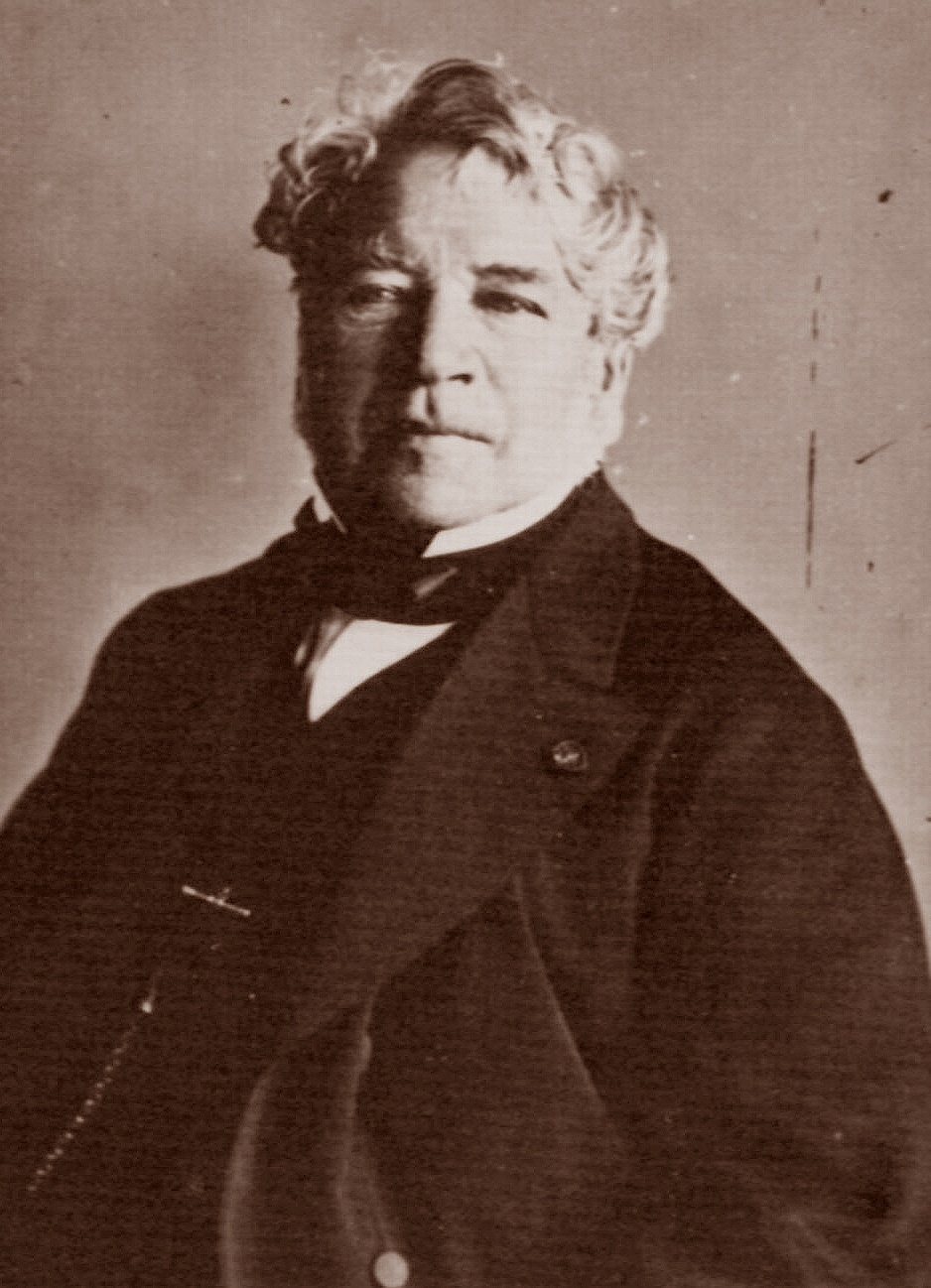
- Eugène Isabey (c.1860); photograph by Nadar.
- Born: 22 July 1803; Paris, France
- Died: 25 April 1886 (aged 82); Montévrain, France
- Known for: Painting
- Movement: Romanticism

Eugène Louis Gabriel Isabey (French pronunciation: [øʒɛn lwi ɡabʁijɛl izabɛ]; 22 July 1803 – 25 April 1886) was a French painter, lithographer and watercolorist in the Romantic style.

== Biography ==
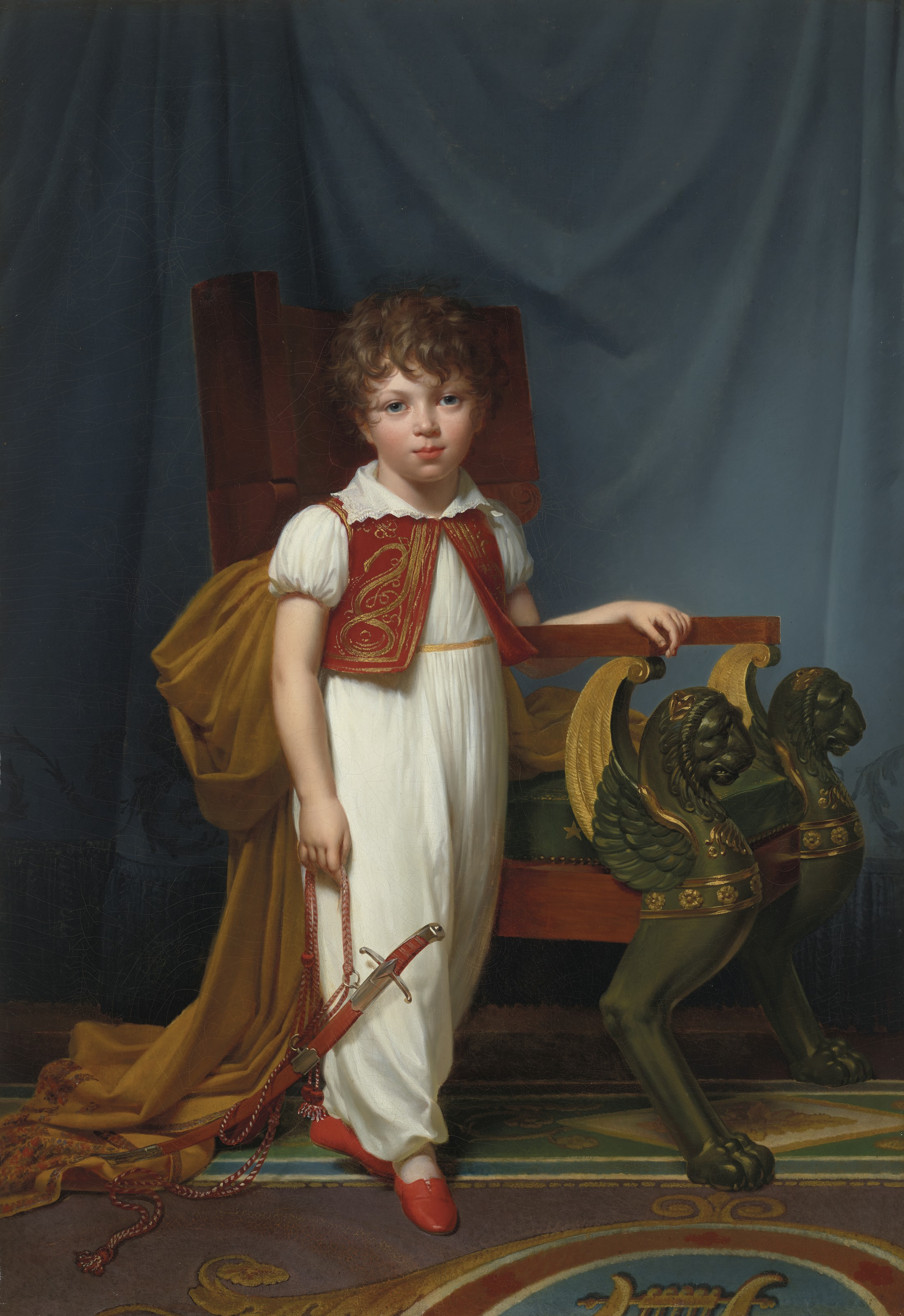
Eugène Isabey as a child, painted in 1810 by Louis-André-Gabriel Bouchet

Eugène Isabey was born to Jean-Baptiste Isabey, a well known painter who enjoyed the patronage of the House of Bonaparte. Originally, he wanted to be a sailor, but his father insisted that he study painting; a turnabout from the usual situation where the family opposes an artistic career in favor of something more practical.

After studying with his father and copying the Old Masters at the Louvre, he began sharing a studio with the landscape painter Xavier Leprince at Honfleur in 1824, then moved to Saint-Siméon after Leprince's untimely death. The following year, he sent some landscapes to the Salon for his first formal exhibition.

In 1831, he was chosen to accompany a diplomatic mission to Morocco, led by the Comte de Mornay, but he politely refused. He had just returned from a short trip to Algiers, where he had painted scenes of the Royal Navy's campaign, and was concerned that the situation there was still too unsettled to make a lengthy stay. He was replaced by his friend, Eugène Delacroix, who created over 100 works that are now considered classics of Orientalism.

Shortly after, Isabey became a court painter for King Louis-Philippe and was named a Knight in the Légion d'Honneur in 1832. One of his best known paintings was done during this period, in 1840, depicting the return of Napoleon's remains from Saint Helena aboard the Belle Poule.

He favored historical paintings, genre scenes and landscapes, but also executed numerous canvases depicting storms and shipwrecks, possibly reflecting his own thwarted career plans. During a trip to England, he was known to have studied the works of J. M. W. Turner. He was especially skillful at rendering subtleties in darker colors; which might be called a form of grisaille. He took in students on a regular basis; including Eugène Boudin, Johan Barthold Jongkind and Durand-Brager. In his later years, he turned from marine painting to historical scenes, usually of a violent nature, such as massacres, duels and robberies.

A primary school in Montévrain has been named in his honor.

== Selected paintings ==
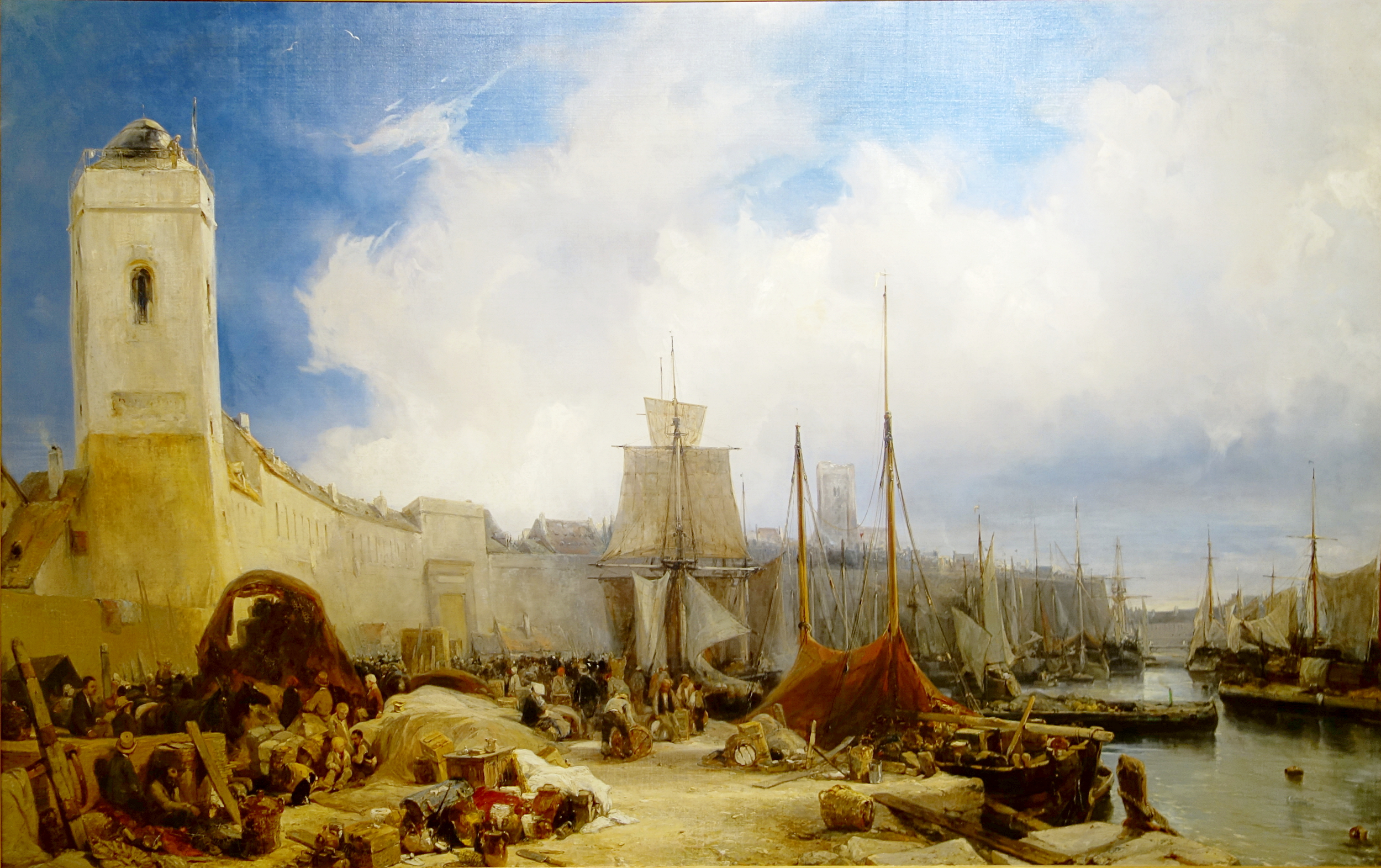
The Port of Dunkirk, 1831

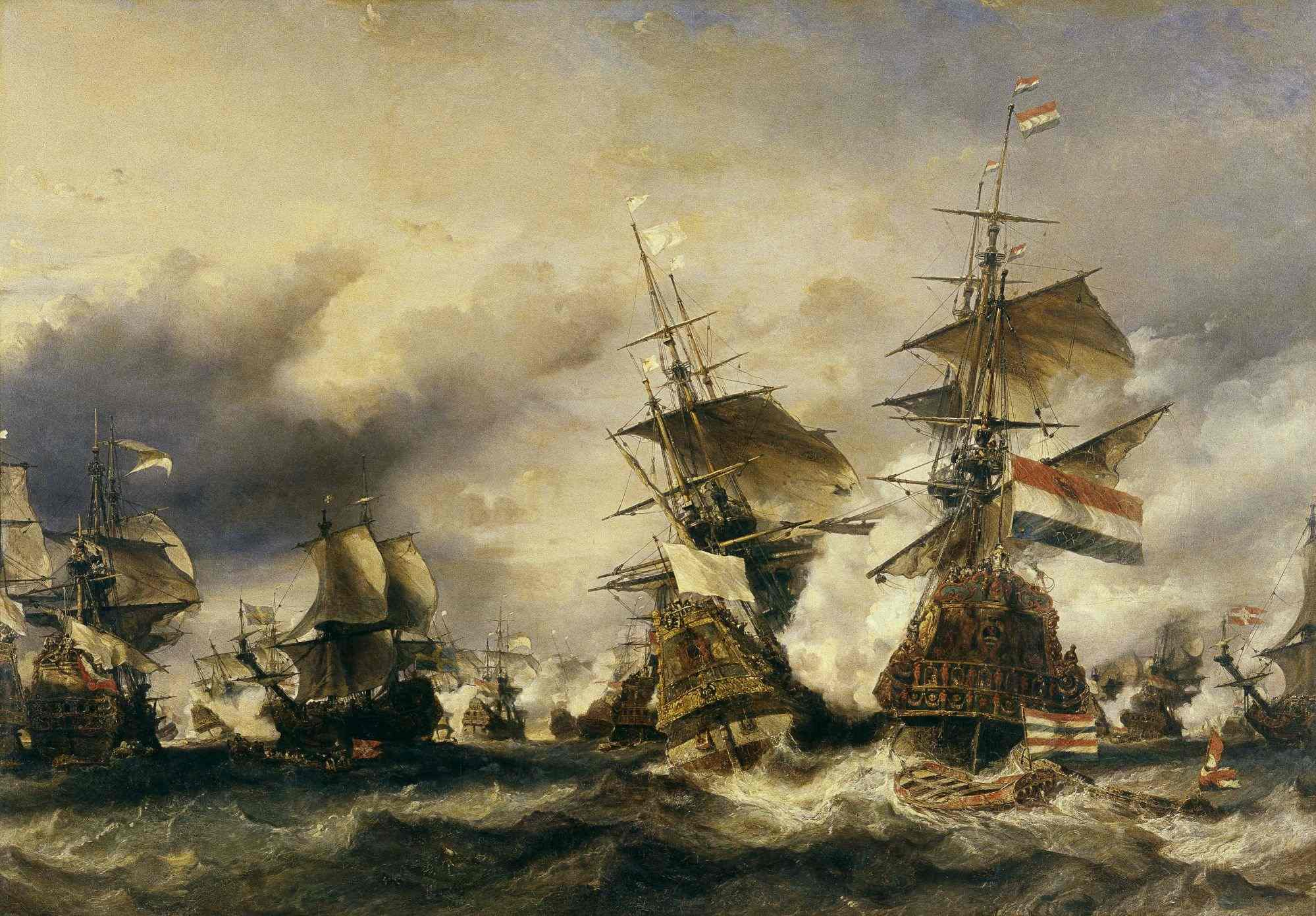
The Battle of Texel, 1839

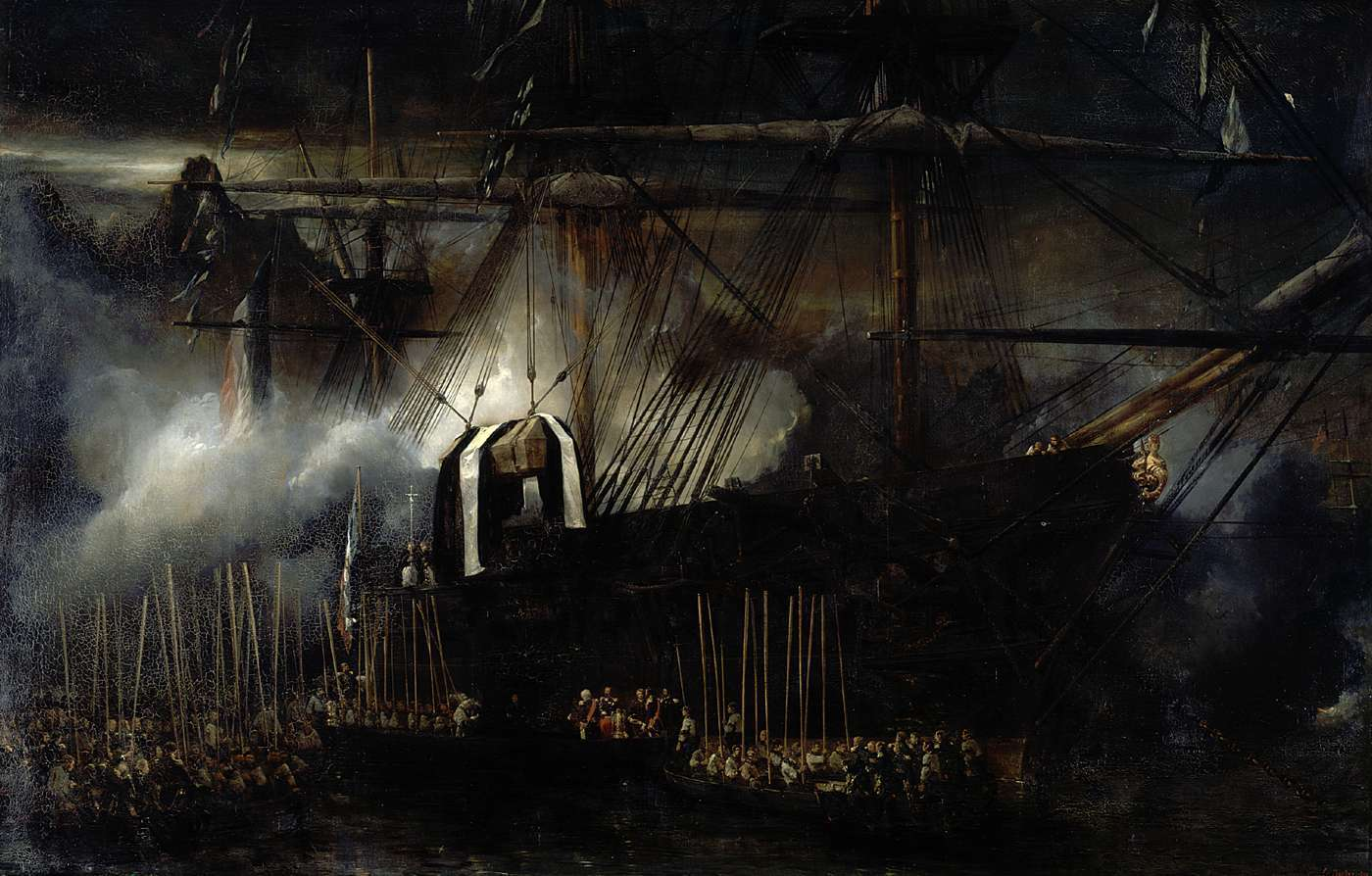
The Return of Napoleon, 1842

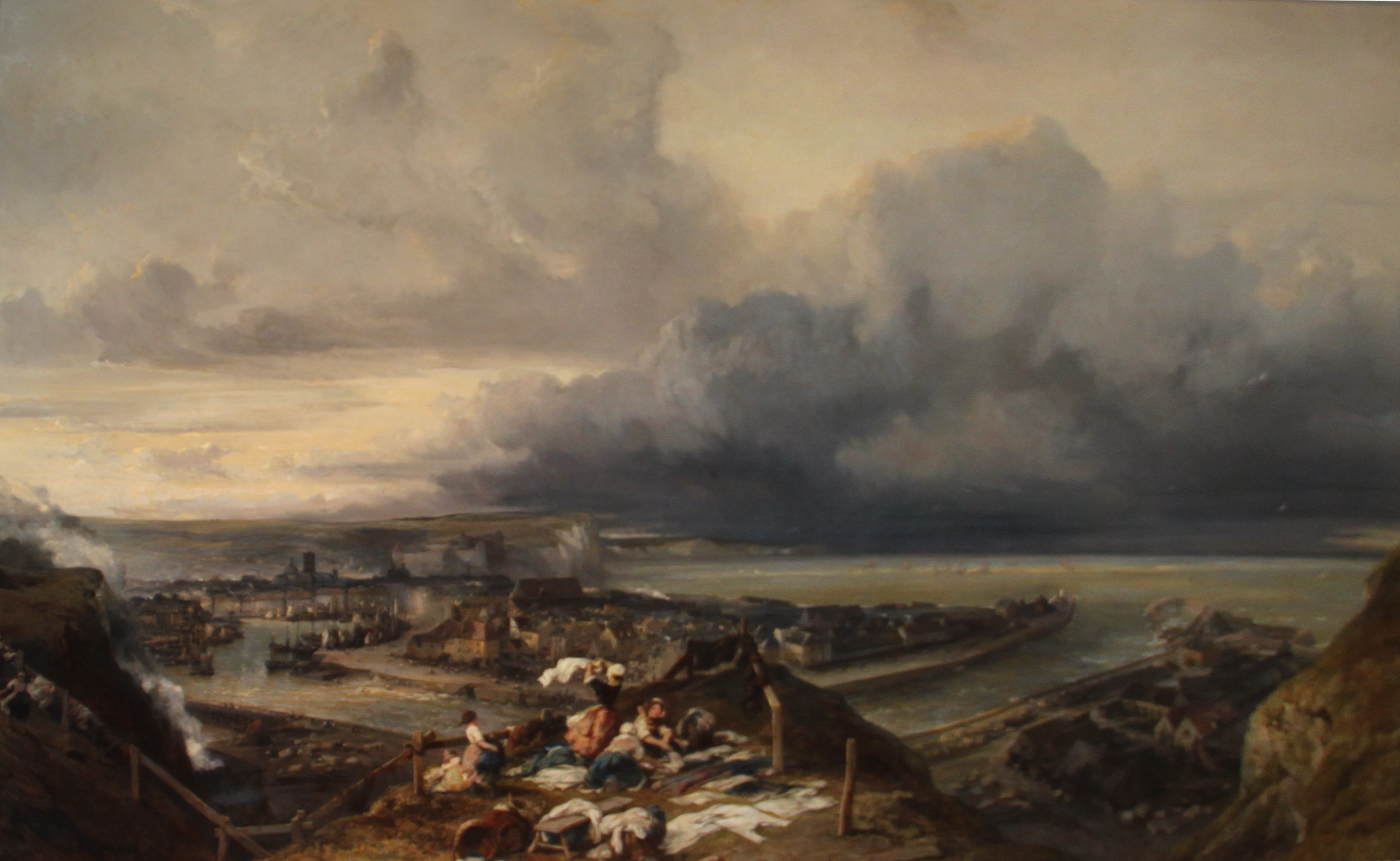
The Town and Port of Dieppe, 1842

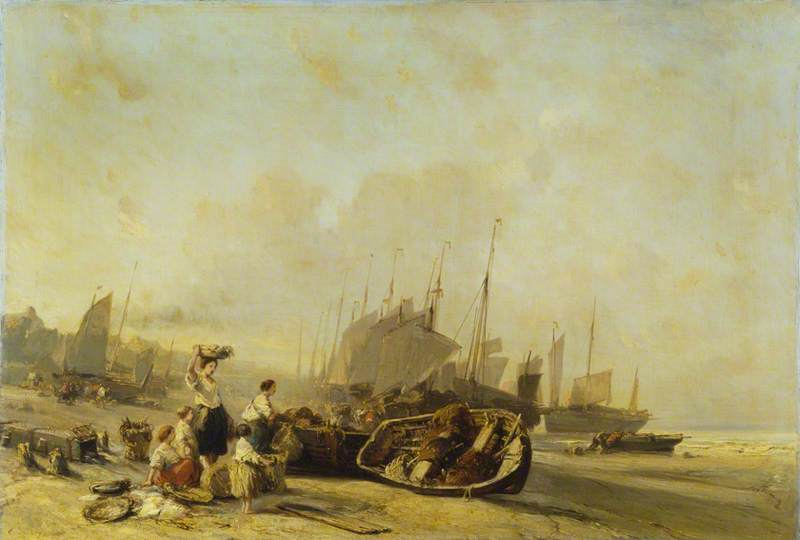
Boats on the Shore at Calais, 1851

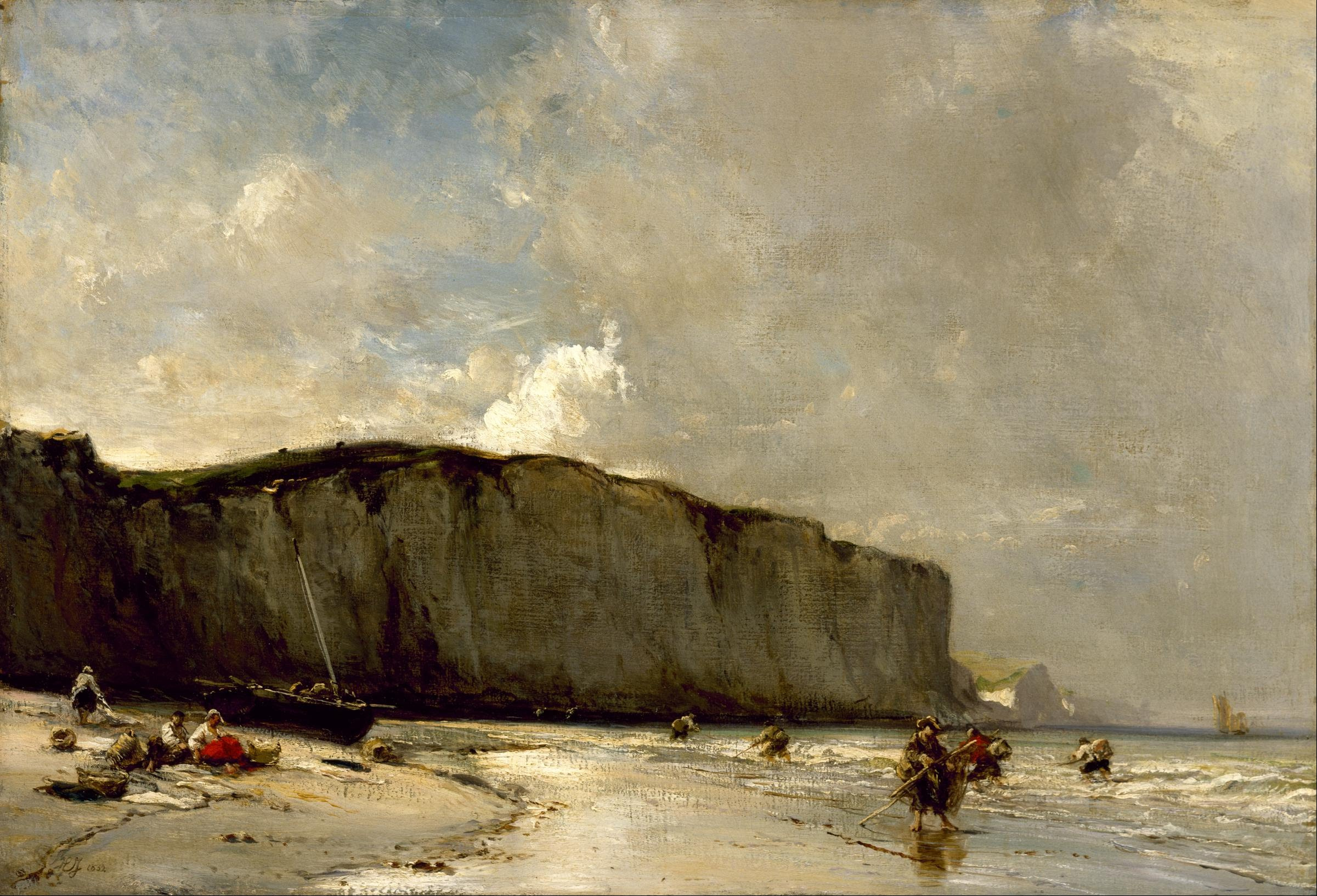
View Along the Norman Coast, 1842

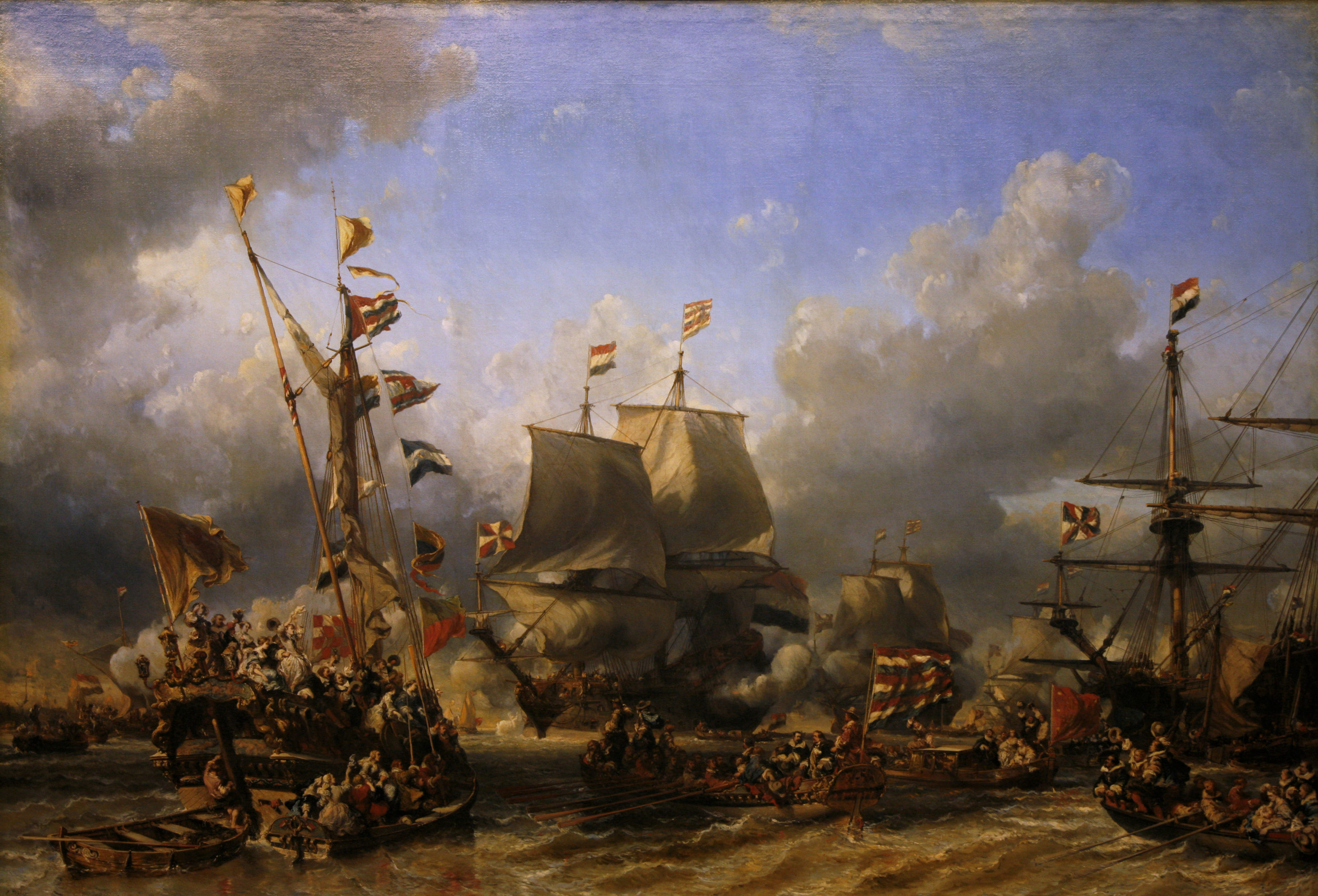
The Embarkment of De Ruyter at
the Battle of Texel, 1850

Hurricane Before Saint Malo, 1860

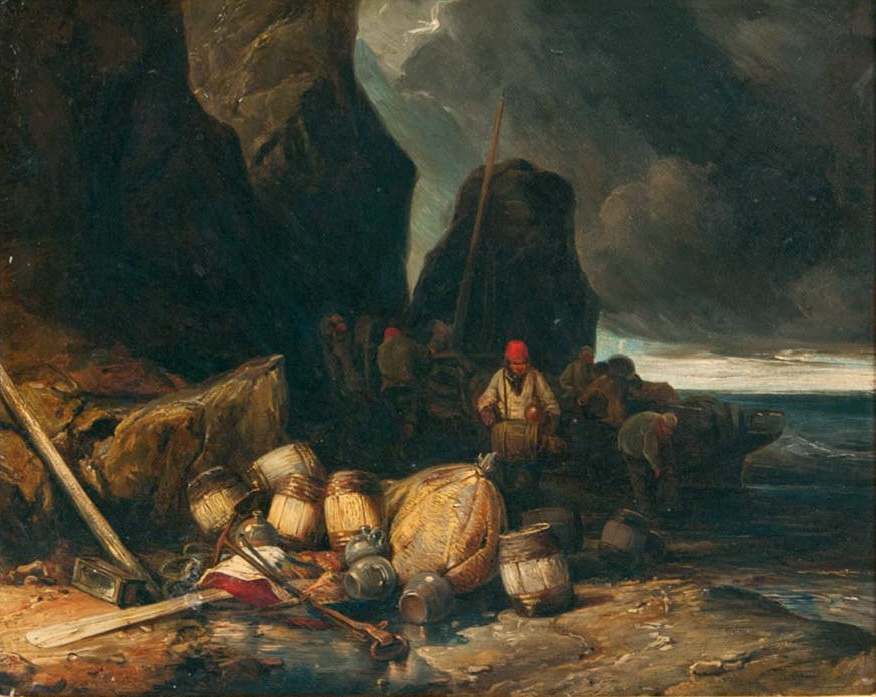
Smugglers on the Beach

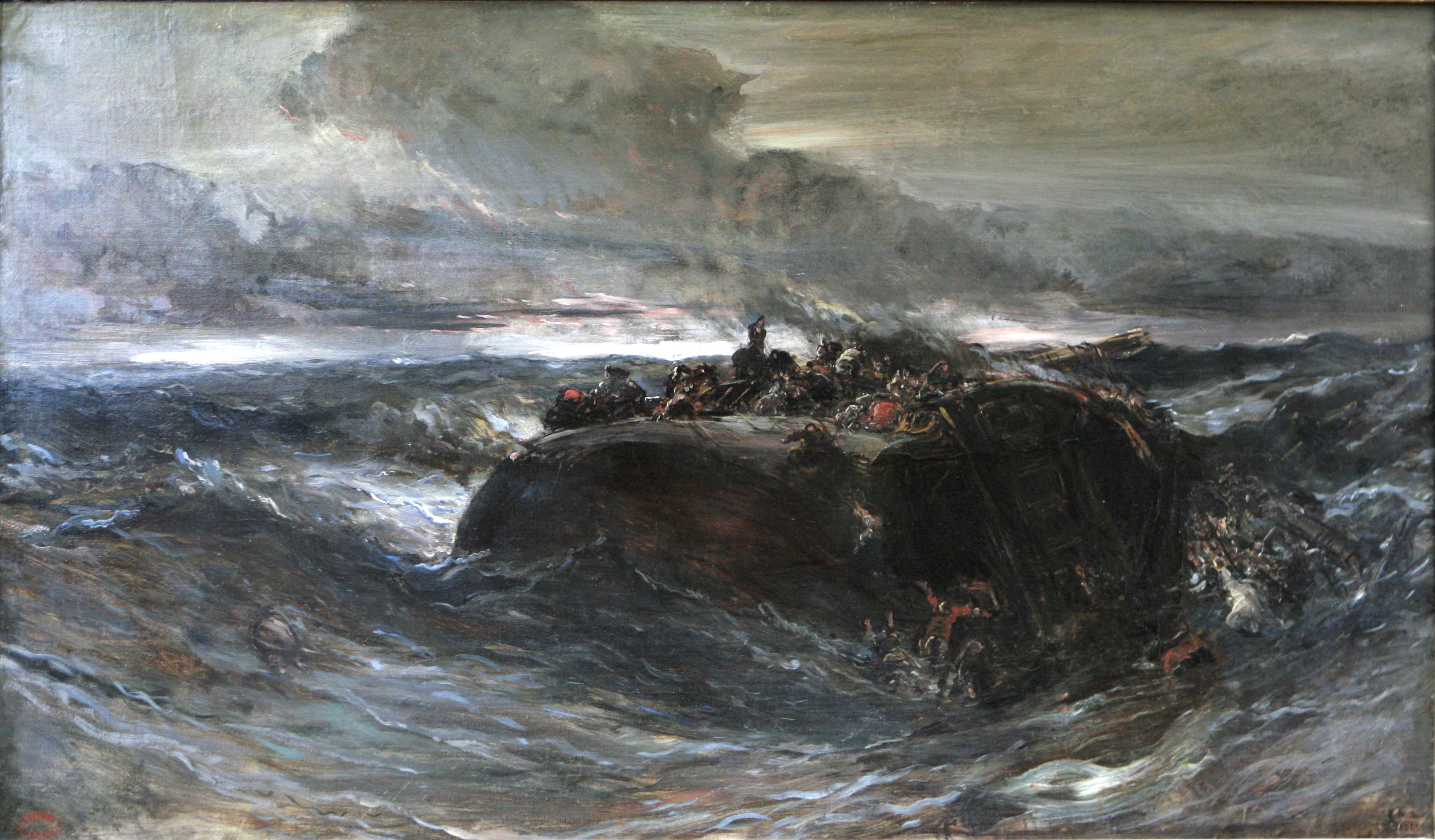
Shipwreck of the Emily, 1865

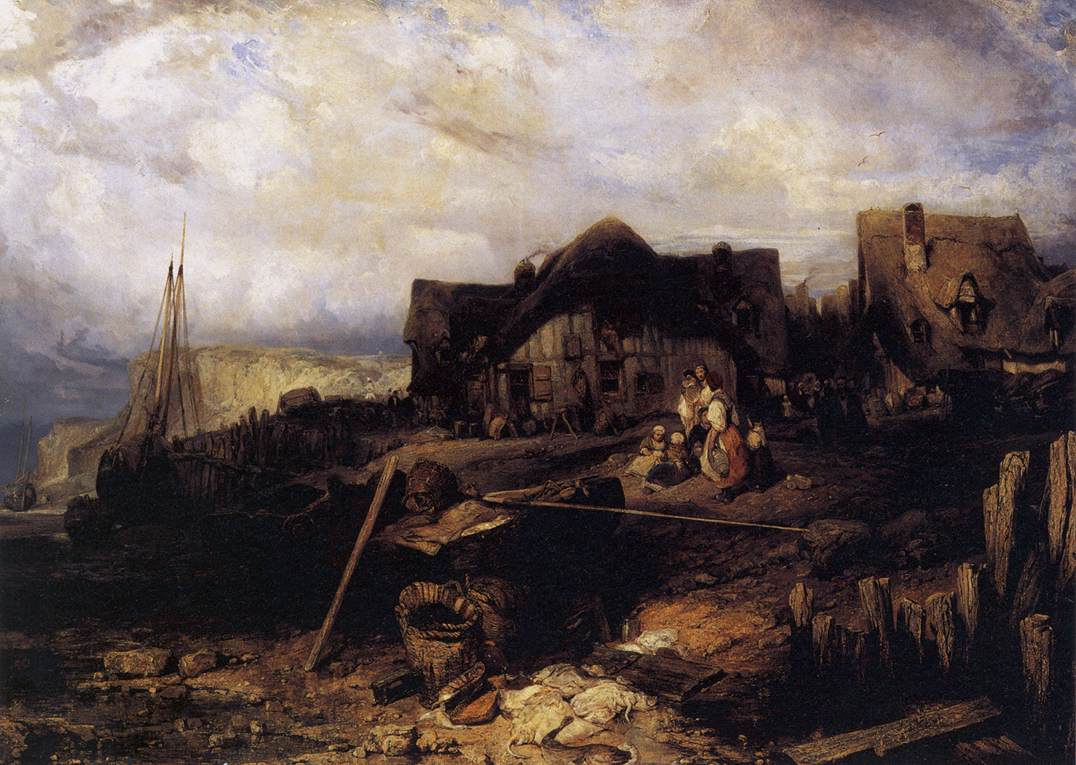
Beach at Low Tide

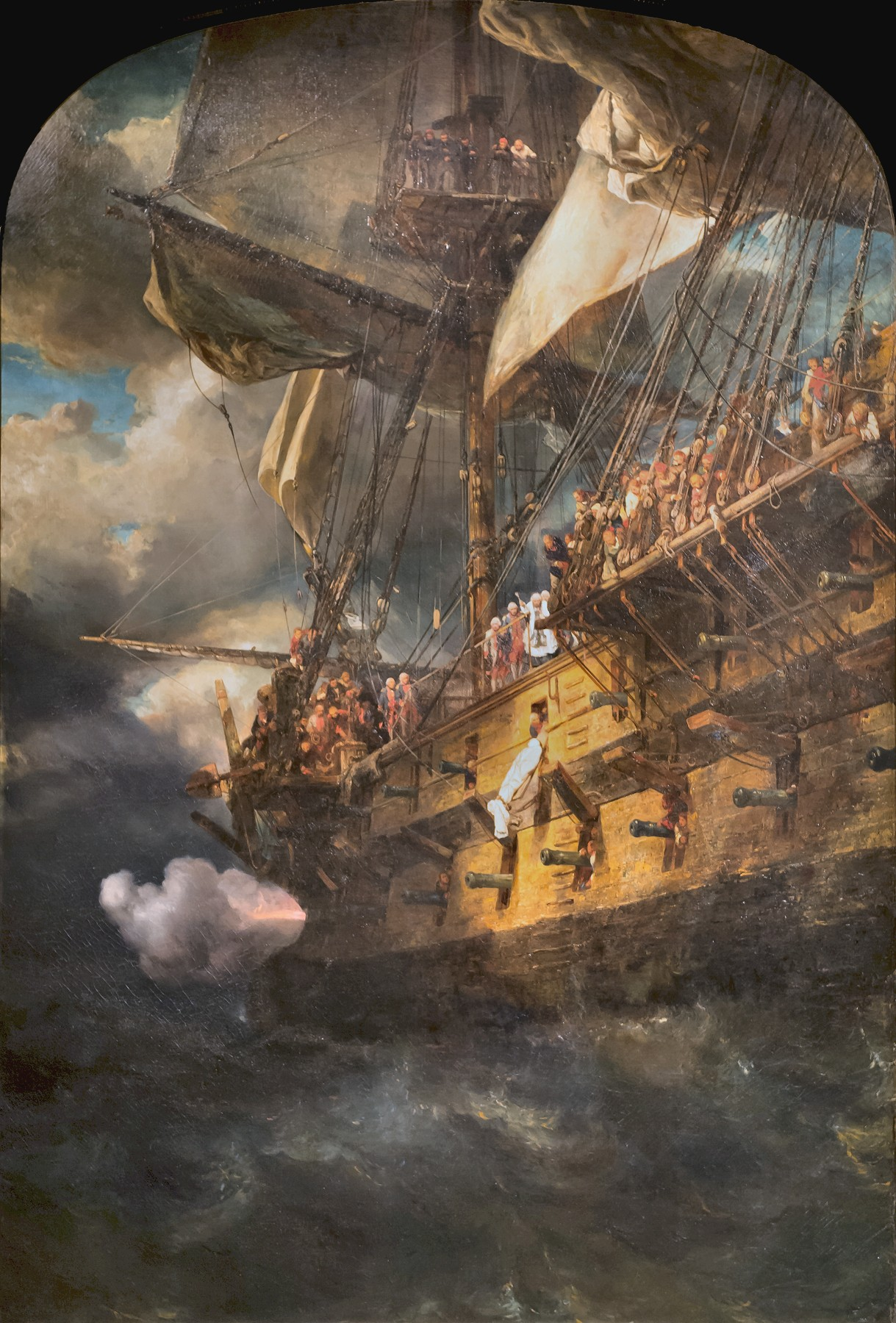
Funeral of a Naval Officer, under Louis XVI

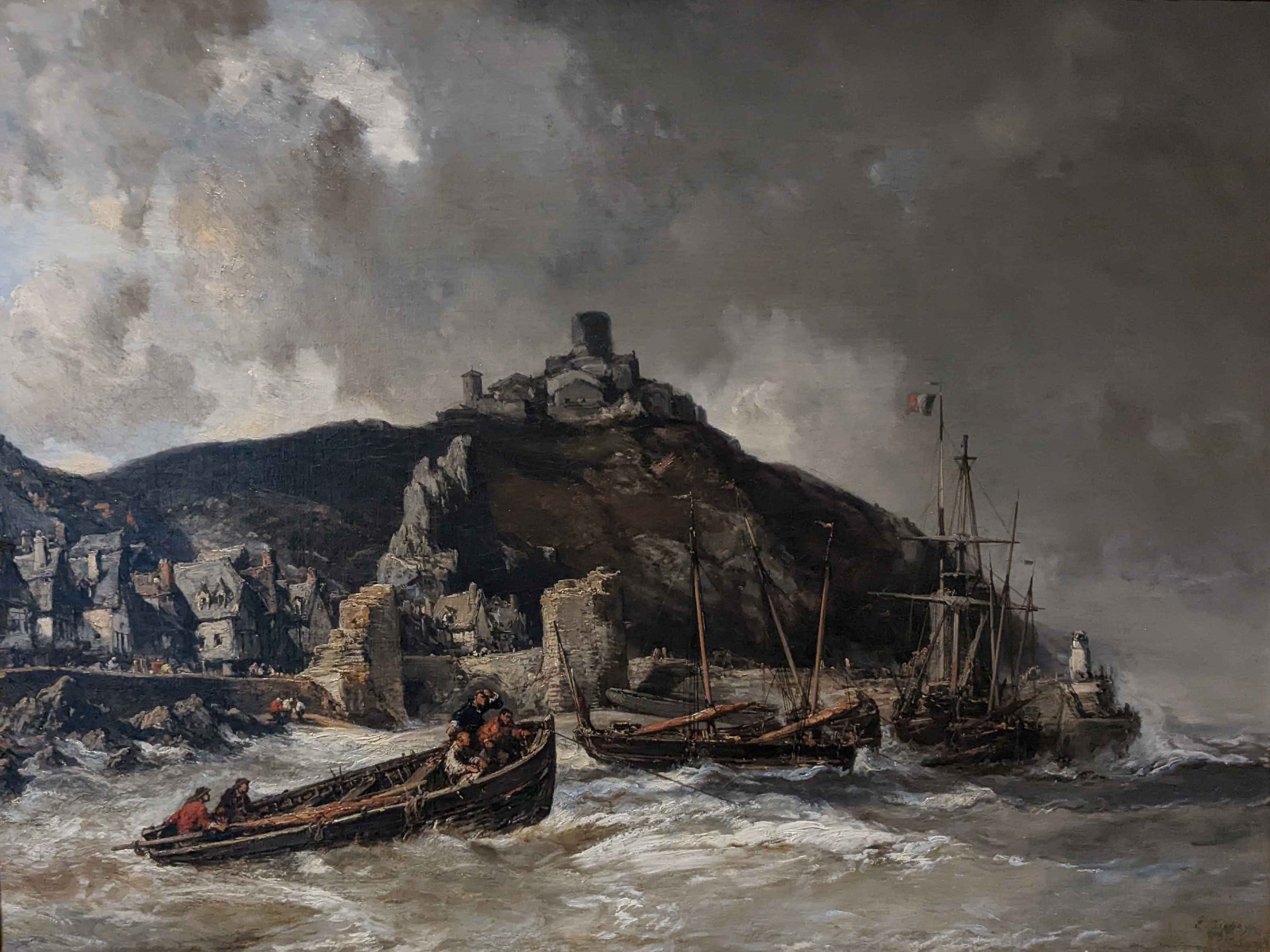
Village de Pêcheurs (Fishing Village)
