= Haymakers (painting) =

Painting by George Stubbs

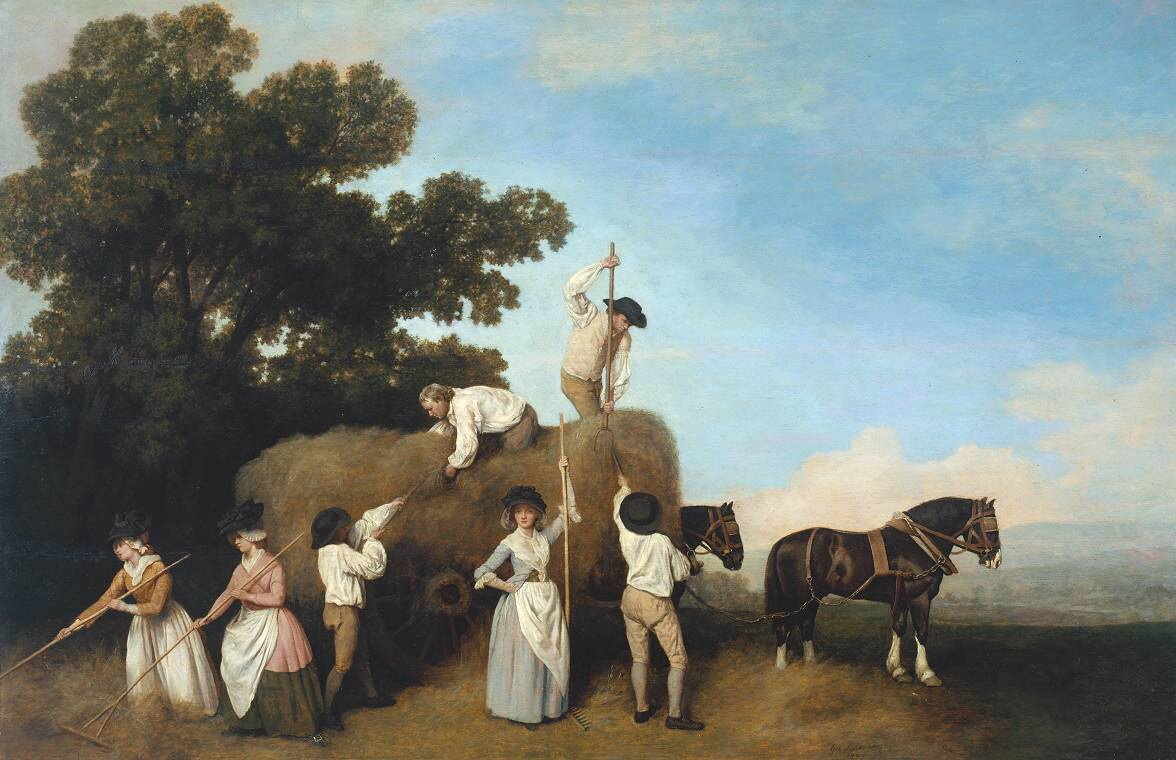
- Artist: George Stubbs
- Year: 1785
- Type: Oil on canvas, genre painting
- Dimensions: 89.5 cm × 132.5 cm (35.2 in × 52.2 in)
- Location: Tate Britain; London

Haymakers is an oil on canvas genre painting by the British artist George Stubbs, from 1785. It depicts a group of farmworkers engaged in haymaking in the English countryside. It is held in the Tate Britain, in London.

== History and description ==
It was produced with a pendant piece Reapers. This is a rare type of work among Stubbs's creations, who specialized in animal paintings. Stubbs had already explored this subject in 1783, with a less accomplished composition. These paintings were made into engravings in 1791, and new versions of the Haymakers and the Harvesters were painted by Stubbs, in 1794 and 1795, this time in an oval format.

The painting depicts a group of haymakers, six men and two women. They are all working, except a woman who stands in the foreground, with her hand on the hip, in front of a cart laden with hay, looking directly at the viewer. Two draft horses are shown in front of a view of the English fields. The clothes of the farm workers are depicted as clean, with no signs of dirt.

Both paintings were exhibited at the Royal Academy of Art's Exhibition of 1786 at Somerset House, the first time he had shown pictures there since 1782. Today it is in the collection of the Tate Britain, in London, having been acquired in 1977.

== Bibliography ==
- Corbett, David Peters (ed.). A Companion to British Art: 1600 to the Present. John Wiley & Sons, 2016.
- Kidson, Alex. George Stubbs: A Celebration. Tate Publishing, 2006.
- Myrone, Martin. Representing Britain, 1500-2000: 100 Works from Tate Collections. Tate Publishing, 2000
