= Bernardo Consorti =

Bernardo Consorti (born c. 1785) was an Italian line-engraver. He was born in Rome. He engraved the Holy Family with Family of St. John after Il Garofalo, the Entombment after Anthony van Dyck, and Psyche and other sculptures of Antonio Canova.
