= Nicolas Benjamin Delapierre =

French painter

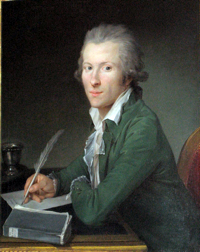
Nicolas Benjamin Delapierre, Portrait of a seated gentleman, 1785

Portrait of a woman, 1784, Museum of Decorative Arts of Paris

Nicolas Benjamin Delapierre (c. 1739 – 24 January 1802) was a well-known and highly regarded French artist during the second half of the 18th century.

== Career ==
Although he began and ended his painting career in France—he was a student of Carle van Loo and Jean-Baptiste-Siméon Chardin—for many intervening years Delapierre painted in Russia. He was active in Moscow (1767), and later in St. Petersburg (beginning in 1768), where he taught at the Imperial Academy of Arts and painted portraits of family members of Petr Borisovich Sheremetev—one of the wealthiest men in the world at the time.

In 1770 he achieved the title of “agree” at the Academy for a portrait of Catherine II, and also became “royal painter”—executing portraits of the principal members of the imperial family.

By 1786 Delapierre had returned to France and was well established in Lyon, where he exhibited four of his portraits at the “Salon des Arts” of Lyon (25 August 1786 – 11 September 1786). Earlier, he might have attended the month-long “Salon de 1785” biennial art exposition in Paris that began on 25 August 1785, because this event was enormously popular among artists and art enthusiasts and attracted people from all over Europe.

== Mystery ==
One of his paintings, Portrait of a Seated Gentleman, is the subject of some mystery. The well-executed portrait, dated 1785, shows an 18th-century gentleman sitting at a desk and beginning to write on a single sheet of paper. On the desk in the foreground is a copy of De la Caisse d'Escompte, a financial pamphlet published on 17 May 1785 by the famous French orator and statesman Mirabeau.

This portrait is particularly intriguing because it was painted several years before Mirabeau achieved prominence, and because the conspicuous financial pamphlet ultimately had important repercussions leading up to the French Revolution. It is believed by some to be the earliest known portrait of Thomas Jefferson.

The ownership of the portrait prior to 1928 is unknown, as is the identity of the sitter. Both are being researched by Omnis, Inc.

== Selected paintings ==
- A Mother Feeding Her Child, 1782
- Portrait of a Seated Gentleman, 1785
- La Fileuse, 1797
