= Portrait of Edward Miles =

Painting by William Beechey

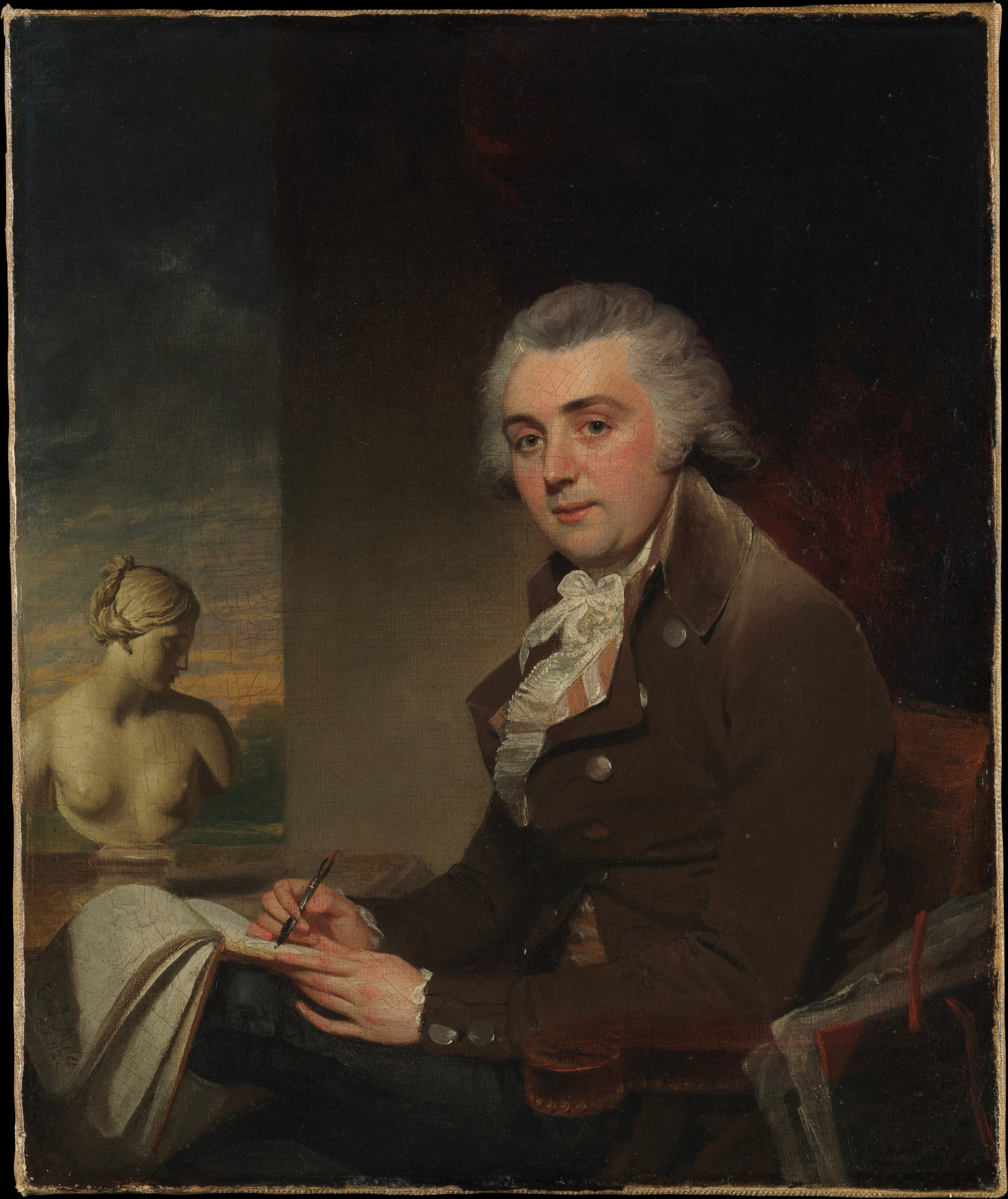
- Artist: William Beechey
- Year: 1785
- Type: Oil on canvas, portrait painting
- Dimensions: 30.2 cm × 25.1 cm (11.9 in × 9.9 in)
- Location: Metropolitan Museum of Art; New York City

Portrait of Edward Miles is a 1785 portrait painting by the British artist William Beechey. It features his fellow artist Edward Miles, famous for his miniature portraits. The Oxfordshire-born Beechey was living in Norwich at the time and was a friend of Miles who lived close to him.

Beechey subsequently rose to prominence through a series of royal commissions and became a noted member of the Royal Academy of Arts. Along with Thomas Lawrence and Martin Archer Shee he was one of the fashionable portrait painters of the Regency era. This is a good example of his early work, whose influence owes more to Johann Zoffany rather than Joshua Reynolds.

The work was displayed at the Royal Academy Exhibition of 1786 held at Somerset House, one of nine paintings he displayed that year. Today the painting is in the collection of the Metropolitan Museum of Art in New York, having been acquired in 1986.

== Bibliography ==
- Baetjer, Katharine. British Paintings in the Metropolitan Museum of Art, 1575-1875. Metropolitan Museum of Art, 2009.
- Roberts, William. William Beechey. Duckworth and Company, 1907.
