= Scene from A Midsummer Night's Dream =

Painting by Edwin Henry Landseer

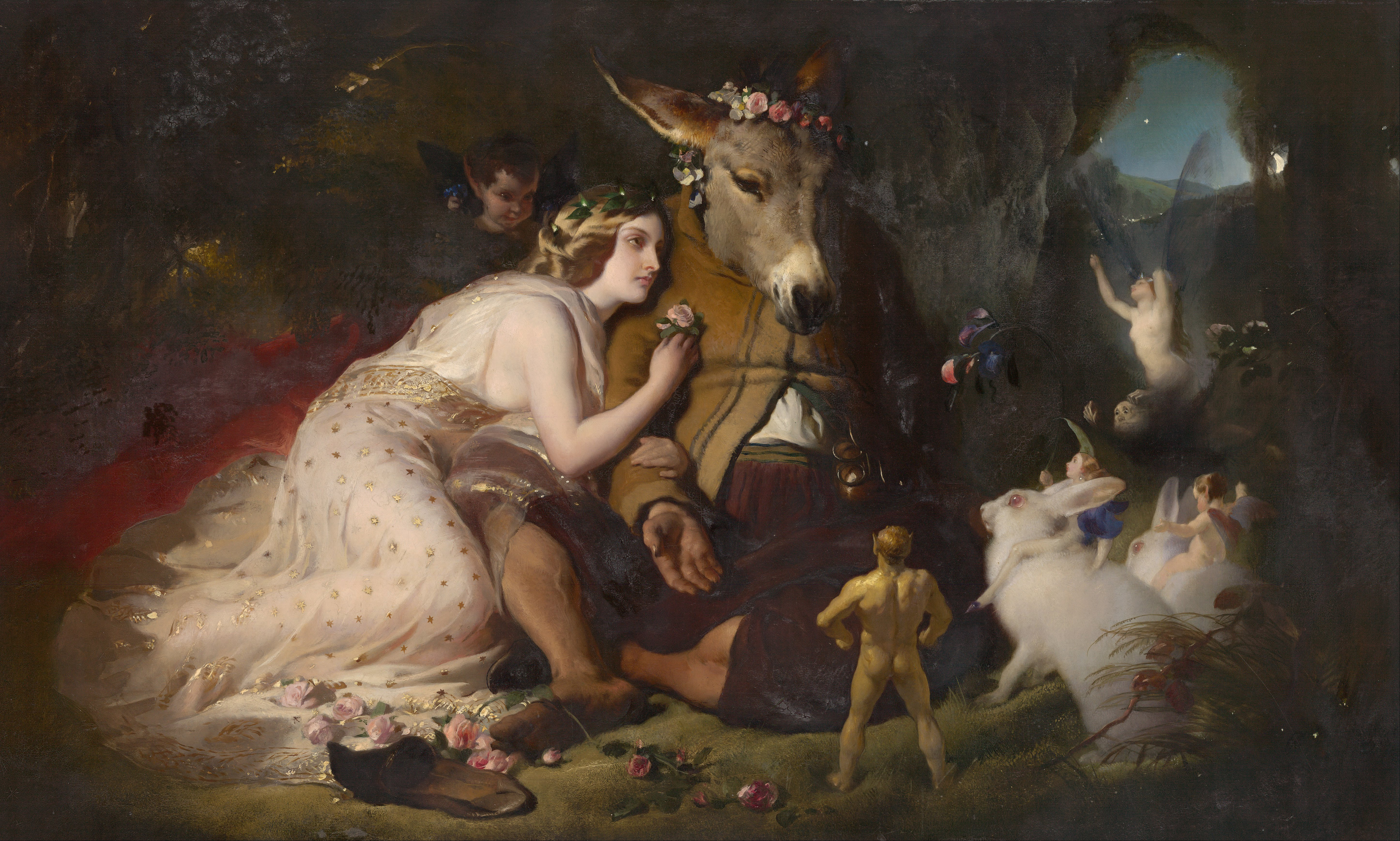
Edwin Landseer, Scene from A Midsummer Night's Dream. Titania and Bottom, 1851, National Gallery of Victoria.

Scene from A Midsummer Night's Dream. Titania and Bottom is an 1851 oil-on-canvas painting by British artist Edwin Landseer. Landseer was mainly known for his paintings of animals: this is his only painting of a fairy scene. The painting depicts a scene from the third act of William Shakespeare's play A Midsummer Night's Dream. It has been in the collection of the National Gallery of Victoria in Melbourne, Australia since 1932.

The painting shows Titania, Queen of the Fairies, after she has been given a love potion, embracing the temporary object of her love, the mechanical Nick Bottom. Bottom has been also enchanted and has the head of an ass. They are observed by other fairy folk, and the scene is decorated with flowers and rabbits.

The work measures 82.0 × 133.0 centimetres (32.3 × 52.4 in). It was one of several paintings of scenes from works by Shakespeare commissioned by Isambard Kingdom Brunel in 1847 to decorate the dining room of his house in London. Landseer was paid £450. Brunel left the choice of subject to the artists, and Landseer may have chosen this scene so he could include several animals. Other works were commissioned from Charles West Cope, Augustus Egg, Frederick Richard Lee, Charles Robert Leslie, and Clarkson Frederick Stanfield.

The painting was first exhibited the Royal Academy's summer exhibition of 1851, and was immediately a popular success. It was praised by Queen Victoria in her diary, and by Lewis Carroll, who admired the white rabbit; the work may have influenced the white rabbit in his book Alice's Adventures in Wonderland.

After Brunel's death in 1859, the painting was sold at auction in April 1860 and acquired by Lord Robert Pelham-Clinton for £2,800. After the death of Pelham-Clinton, it was acquired by Adelbert Brownlow-Cust, 3rd Earl Brownlow, and later sold to Sir William Quilter, 1st Baronet. It was then sold to Henry Lowenfeld at Christie's in 1909 for £2,400 (the auction also included Holman Hunt's The Scapegoat). After Lowenfeld's death in 1931, his widow sold the painting to the National Gallery of Victoria, Melbourne (funded from the Felton Bequest) where it remains today.
