= A View near Matlock, Derbyshire =

Painting by Philip James de Loutherbourg

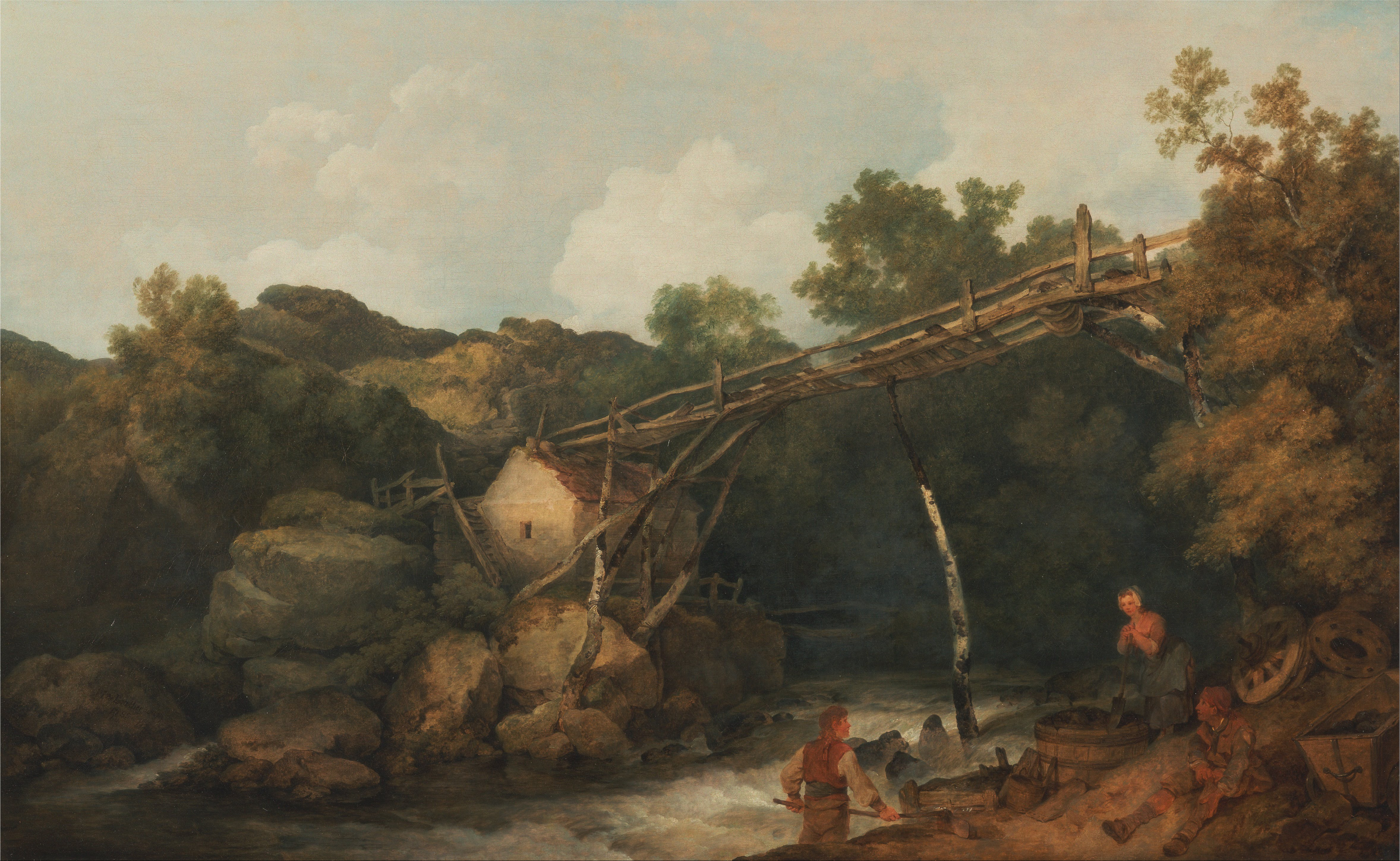
- Artist: Philip James de Loutherbourg
- Year: 1785
- Type: Oil on canvas, landscape painting
- Dimensions: 90.5 cm × 144.8 cm (35.6 in × 57.0 in)
- Location: Yale Center for British Art, New Haven

A View near Matlock, Derbyshire is an oil on canvas landscape painting by the French-born British artist Philip James de Loutherbourg, from 1785. It portrays a scene near Matlock in Derbyshire, close to the village of Matlock Bath in the Derwent Valley. Men are show at work beneath a wooden conveyor designed to draw water from a lead mine.

Born in Strasbourg, Loutherbourg settled in Britain in 1771 and was known for producing landscapes as well as his innovates set designs for the theatre. The artist painted and exhibited a number of depictions of the county including around Dovedale. In 1779 he had created a theatrical production at Drury Lane The Wonders of Derbyshire featuring scenic backdrops including Matlock. Today the painting is in the Yale Center for British Art in Connecticut as part of the Paul Mellon Collection. An engraving based on the painting was produced by Joseph Constantine Stadler, with a copy now in the British Museum.

== Bibliography ==
- Groves, Stephen. The Sound of the English Picturesque: Georgian Vocal Music, Haydn, and Landscape Aesthetics. Taylor & Francis, 2023
- Murray, Christopher John. Encyclopedia of the Romantic Era, 1760-1850, Volume 2. Taylor & Francis, 2004.
- Preston, Lillian Elvira. Philippe Jacques de Loutherbourg: Eighteenth Century Romantic Artist and Scene Designer. University of Florida, 1977.
- Swindells, Julia & Taylor, David Francis. The Oxford Handbook of the Georgian Theatre 1737-1832. OUP, 2014.
