= Portrait of William Herschel =

Painting by Lemuel Francis Abbott

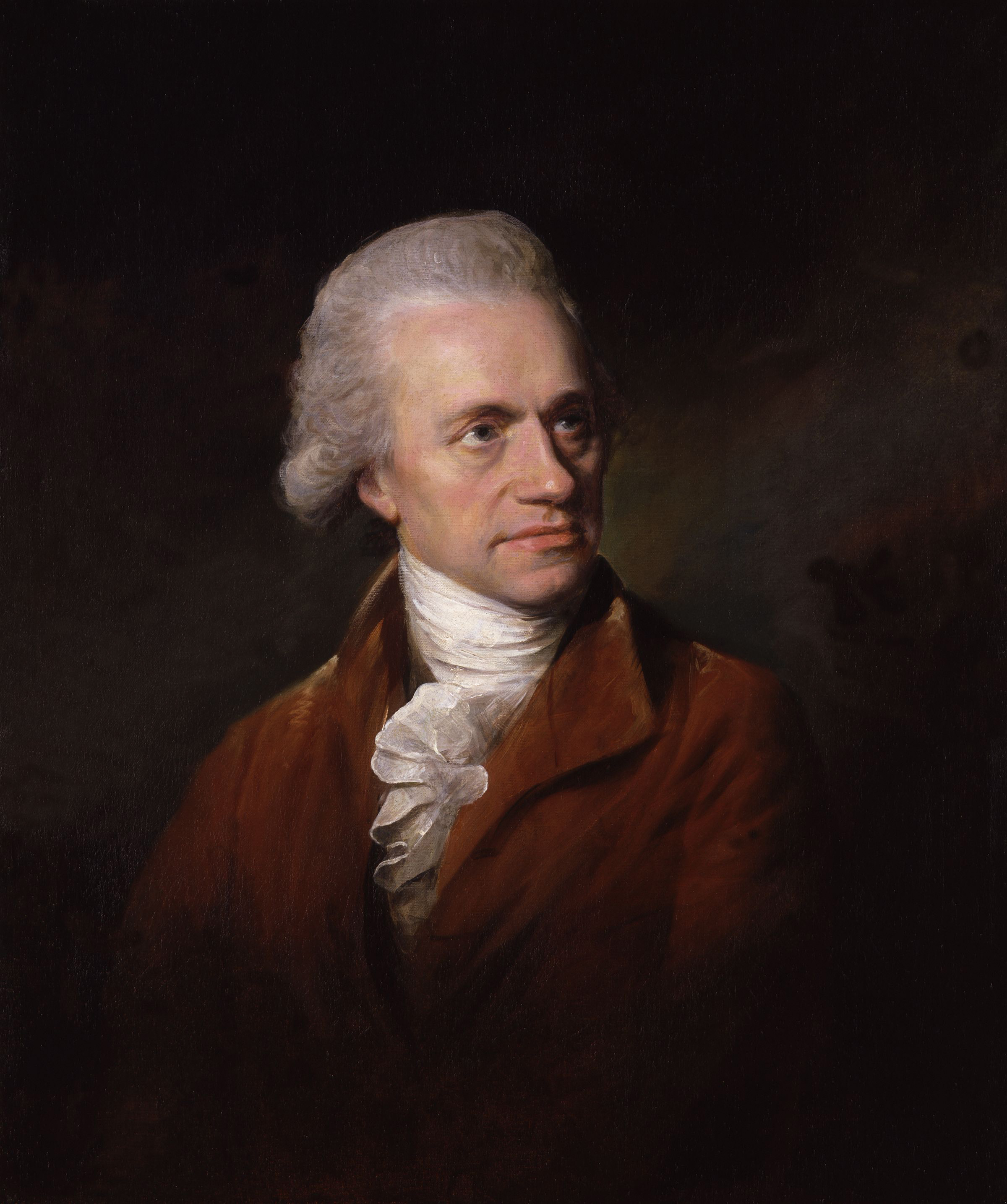
- Artist: Lemuel Francis Abbott.
- Year: 1785
- Type: Oil on canvas, portrait painting
- Dimensions: 76.2 cm × 63.5 cm (30.0 in × 25.0 in)
- Location: National Portrait Gallery; London

Portrait of William Herschel is a 1785 portrait painting by the British artist Lemuel Francis Abbott. It depicts the German-born British astronomer and composer William Herschel. Herschel is best known for discovering the planet Uranus in 1781, which he initially named Georgium Sidus after George III.

Herschel sat at the request of his friend William Watson. The painting is now in the collection of the National Portrait Gallery in London, having been acquired in 1860. In 1788 an engraving was produced by Thomas Ryder based on the picture. A replica of the painting was produced for the Bath Literary and Philosophical Institution.

== Bibliography ==
- Holmes, Richard. The Romantic Poets and Their Circle. National Portrait Gallery, 2005.
- Jordanova, Ludmilla. Defining Features: Scientific and Medical Portraits, 1660-2000. Reaktion Books, 2012.
- Walker, Richard John Boileau. Regency Portraits, Volume 1. National Portrait Gallery, 1985.
