= 1789 in art =

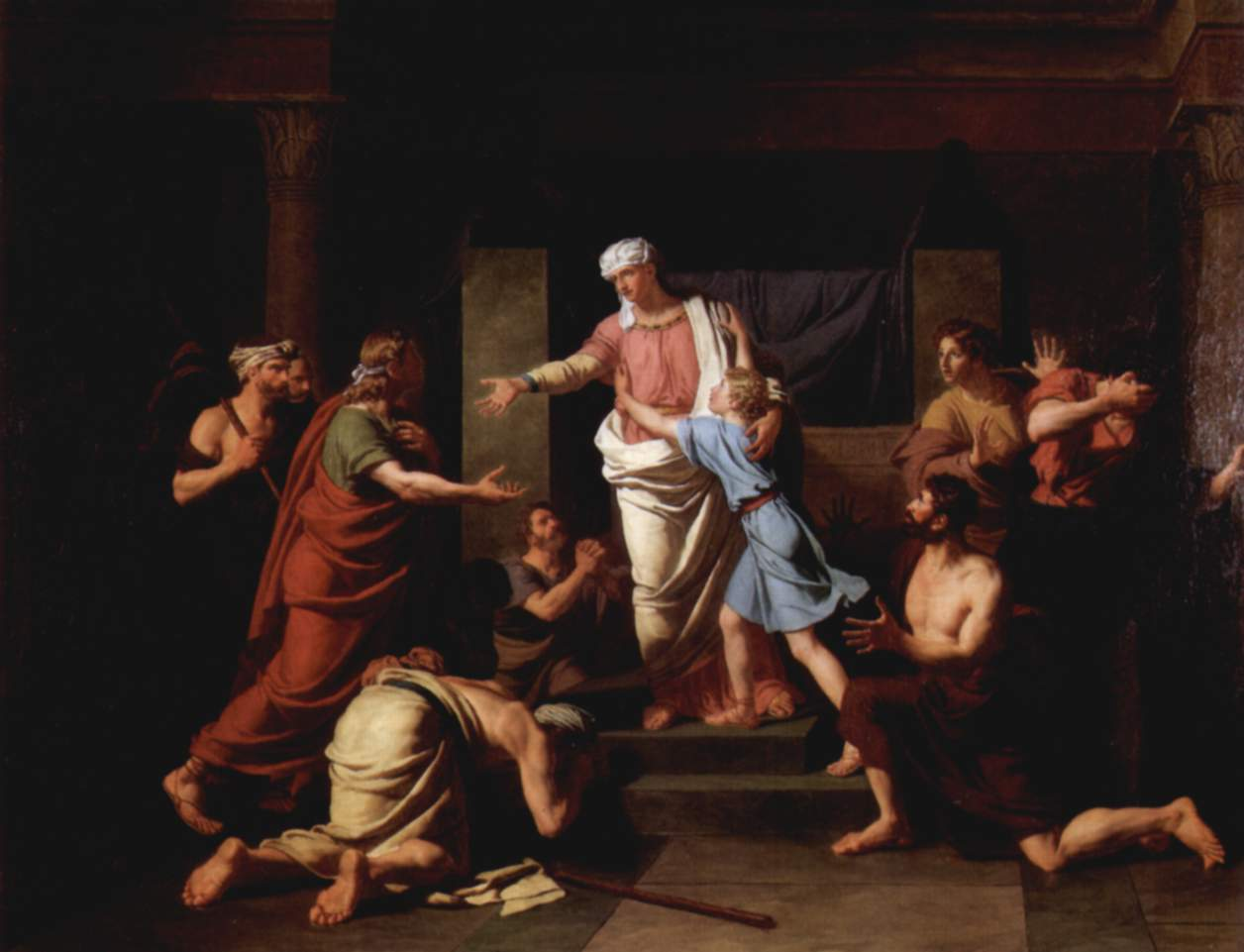

Events from the year 1789 in art.

== Events ==
- April 27 – The Royal Academy Exhibition of 1789 opens at Somerset House in London
- May 4 – The Boydell Shakespeare Gallery, designed for John Boydell by George Dance the Younger, is opened in London.
- James Stuart and Nicholas Revett publish "The Antiquities of Athens" with William Pars's 1765 painting "The Parthenon when it contained a mosque".
- Sir Joshua Reynolds loses the sight of his left eye, which forces him into retirement from painting.

== Works ==
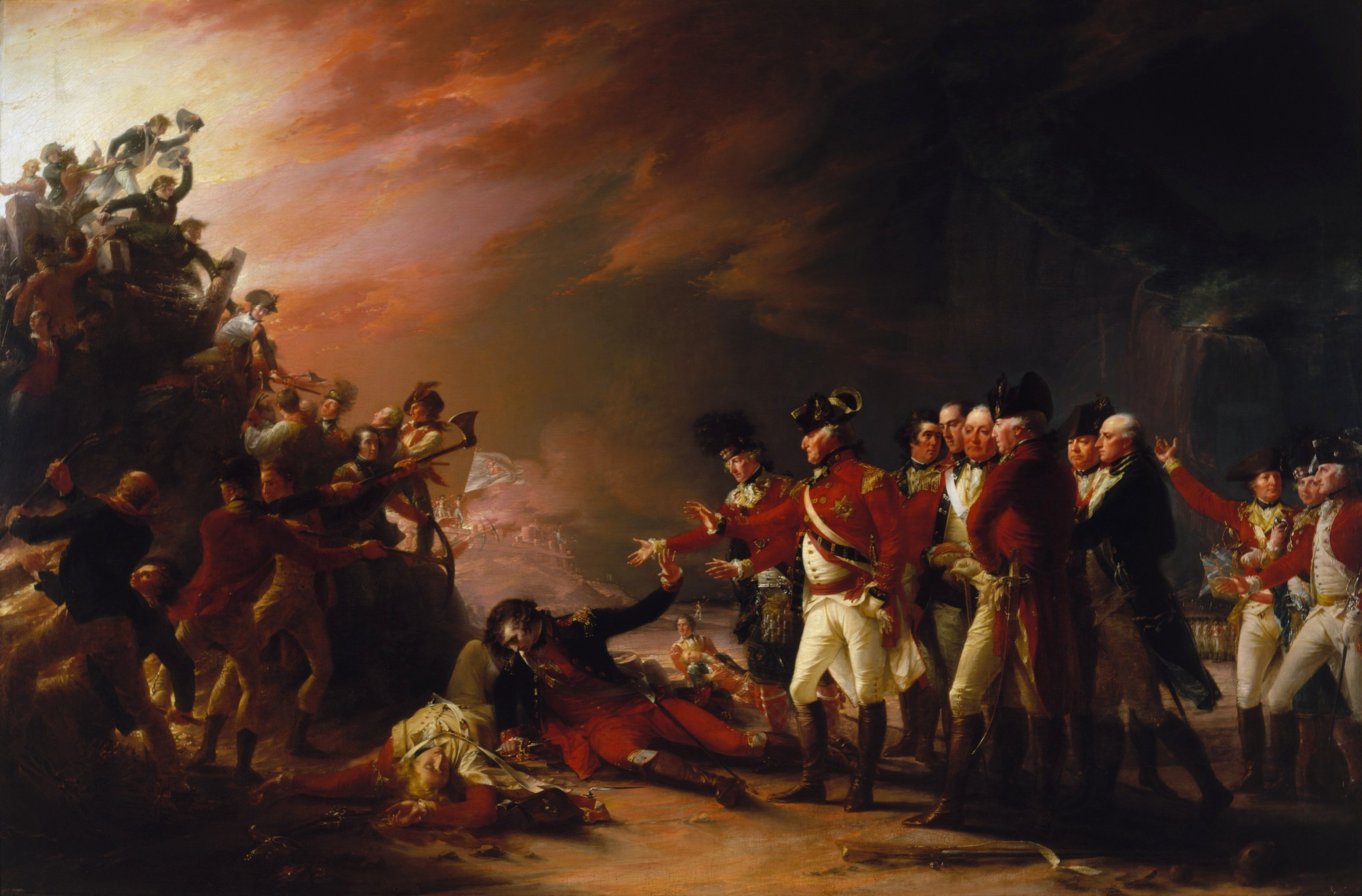
John Trumbull – The Sortie Made by the Garrison of Gibraltar, 1789

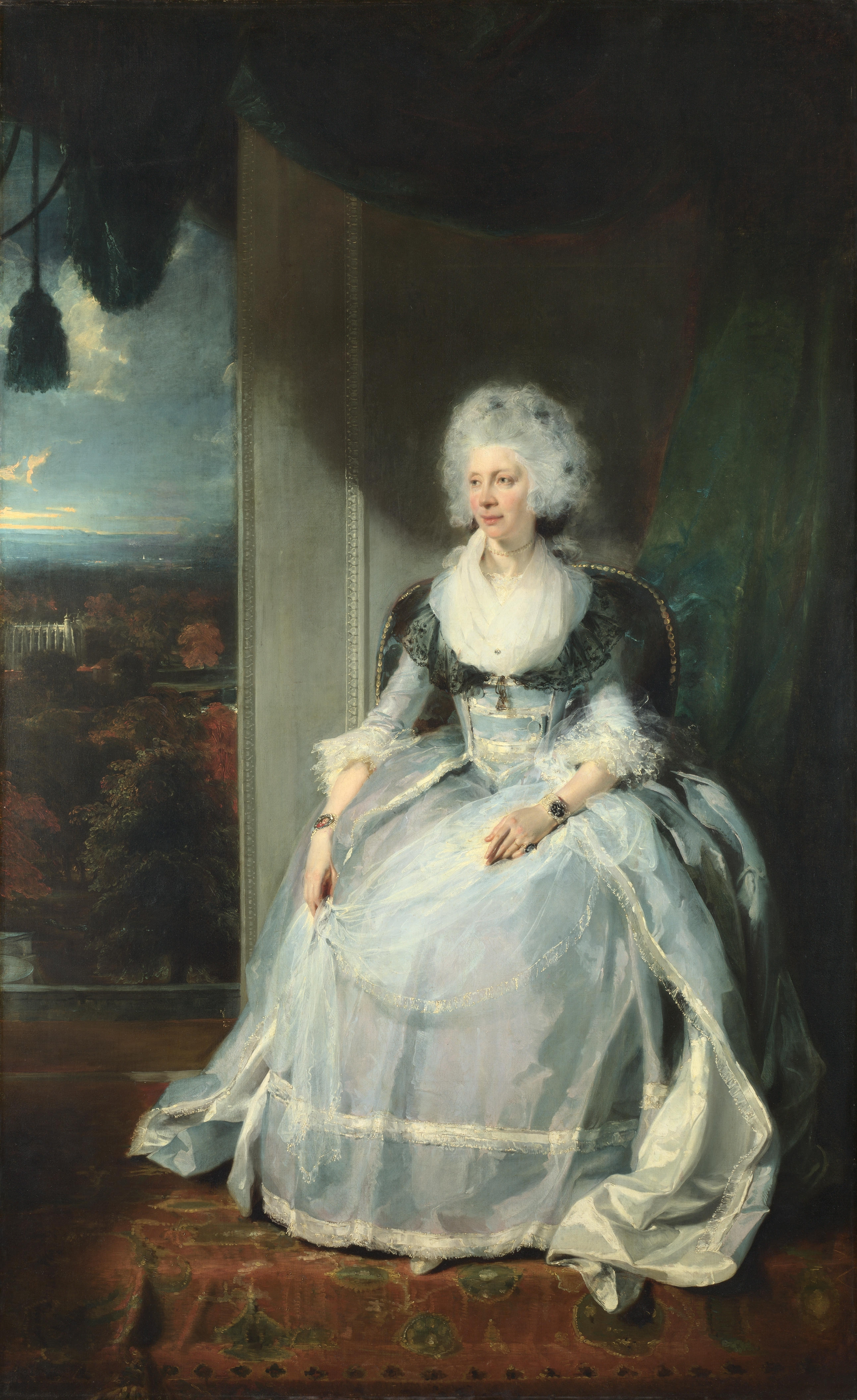
Thomas Lawrence – Portrait of Queen Charlotte

- John Singleton Copley – The Defeat of the Floating Batteries at Gibraltar, September 1782
- Jacques-Louis David – The Lictors Bring to Brutus the Bodies of His Sons
- Anne-Louis Girodet de Roussy-Trioson – Joseph Recognised by His Brothers
- Francisco Goya – Blind Man's Bluff (cartoon for tapestry)
- Thomas Lawrence
  - Portrait of Queen Charlotte
- Élisabeth Vigée Le Brun – Portrait of Madame Perregaux
- Joshua Reynolds
  - The Braddyll Family
  - Cupid and Psyche
  - Puck (Boydell Shakespeare Gallery)
- Hubert Robert – The Bastille During the First Days of its Demolition
- John Trumbull – The Sortie Made by the Garrison of Gibraltar, 1789
- François-André Vincent – Zeuxis Choosing the Most Beautiful Women from Croton as His Models
- Benjamin West
  - The Burghers of Calais
  - George III Resuming Power
  - Queen Philippa at the Battle of Neville's Cross

== Births ==
- March 7 – Michel Martin Drolling, French painter of history and portraits (died 1851)
- April 29 – Karl Ludwig Frommel, German landscape painter and engraver (died 1863)
- June 30 – Horace Vernet, French painter of battles, portraits, and Orientalist Arab subjects (died 1863)
- July 4 – Johann Friedrich Overbeck, German painter (died 1869)
- July 19 – John Martin, English painter and engraver (died 1854)
- July 31 – Jean-Pierre Montagny, French medallist and coiner (died 1862)
- September 7 – Friedrich Wilhelm Schadow, German Romantic painter (died 1862)
- November 12 – William Turner of Oxford, English topographical watercolourist (died 1862)
- November 20 – John Partridge, British artist and portrait painter (died 1872)
- date unknown
  - Jakob Alt, German landscape painter (died 1872)
  - Jules Robert Auguste, French painter Impressionist movement (died 1850)
  - Giovanni Battista Cassevari, Italian miniature portrait painter, (died 1876)
  - Auguste Hüssener, German engraver and miniature painter (died 1877)
  - Elisabeth Charlotta Karsten, Swedish and Russian painter (died 1856)
  - Hans Michelsen, Norwegian sculptor (died 1859)

== Deaths ==
- January 4 – Johan Jacob Bruun, Danish gouache painter best known for his topographic prospects (born 1715)
- May 9 – Giuseppe Bonito, Neapolitan painter of the Rococo period (born 1707)
- May 15 – Jean-Baptiste Marie Pierre, French painter, drawer and administrator (born 1714)
- June 12 – Jean-Étienne Liotard, Swiss-French painter (born 1702)
- August 22 – Johann Heinrich Tischbein, member of the Tischbein family of German painters (born 1722)
- December 3 – Claude Joseph Vernet, French painter (born 1714)
- date unknown
- Kim Eung-hwan, Korean painter of the late Joseon period (born 1742)
- Jeremiah Meyer, English miniaturist (born 1735)
- Nikola Nešković, Serbian religious painter of icons, frescos, and portraits (born 1740)
- Thomas Parkinson, British portrait painter (born 1744)
- Orazio Solimena, Italian painter (born 1690)
