= Royal Academy Exhibition of 1789 =

1789 art exhibition in London

The Royal Academy Exhibition of 1789 was the twenty first annual Summer Exhibition of the British Royal Academy of Arts. It was held at Somerset House in London between 27 April and 6 June 1789. It took place a short time before the outbreak of the French Revolution across the English Channel. For the first George III did not attend as he was still recovering from his illness.

There was a concern that so many artists were too busy working on history paintings for the new Boydell Shakespeare Gallery that there would be a be a shortage of such works. It was suggested that Joshua Reynolds, the President of the Royal Academy, had sent three history paintings along with his more usual portraits in an attempt to fill the gap. In the event the paintings that did appear were generally praised. Reynolds displayed Cupid and Psyche, Continence of Scipio and Cymon and Iphigenia. His portraits included depictions of the admiral Lord Rodney and the playwright Richard Brinsley Sheridan as well as one of his niece Theophila Gwatkin.

The young Bristol-born artist Thomas Lawrence continued his rise by exhibiting oil paintings alongside the pastel portraits he had previously been producing. His Portrait of William Linley received particular praise. The American Benjamin West, who in 1792 would succeed Reynolds to become the second President of the Academy enjoyed success with his Shakespearian King Lear in the Storm, which was destined for the Boydell Shakespeare Gallery in Pall Mall.

== Gallery ==
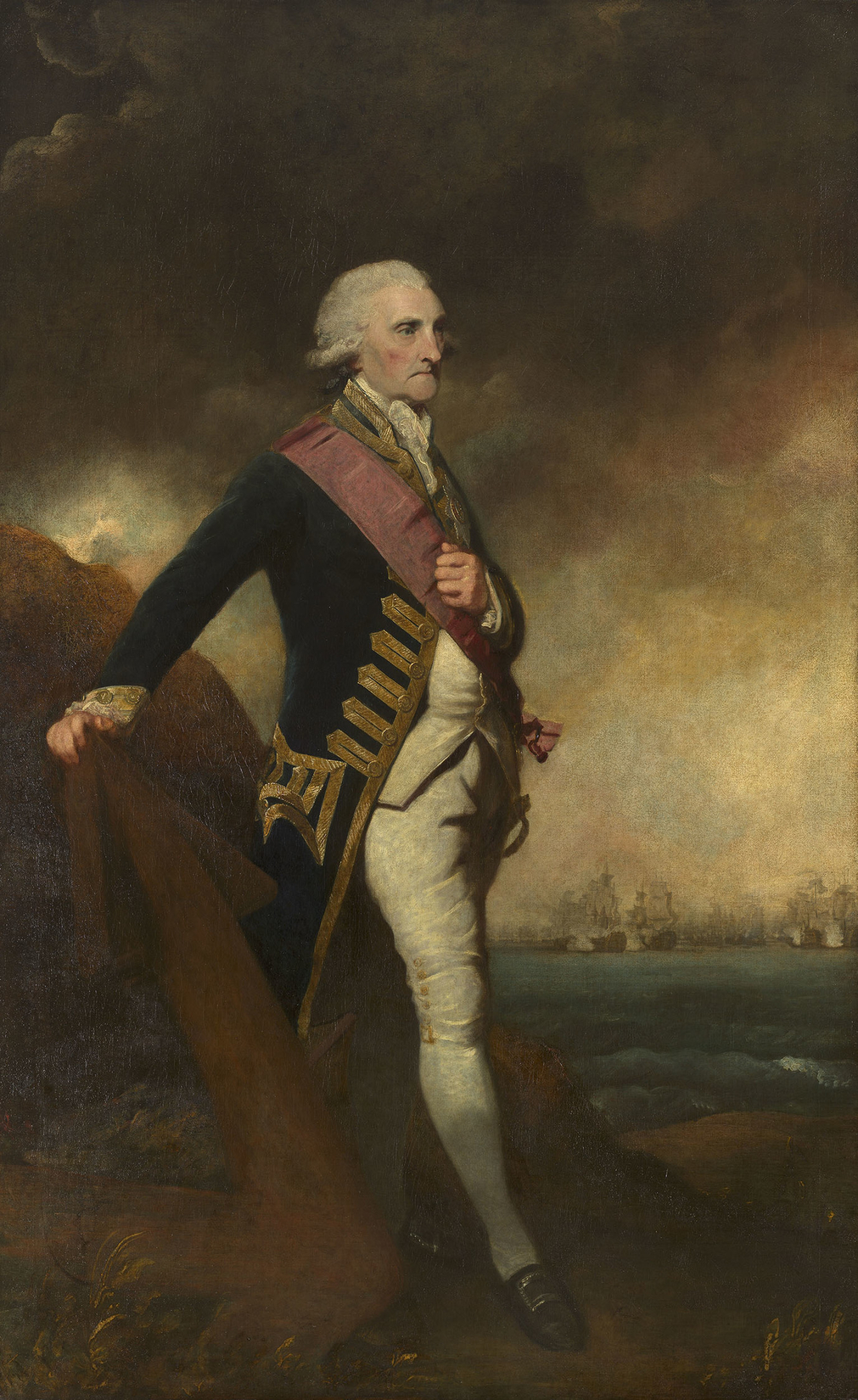
George Rodney, 1st Baron Rodney - Portrait of Lord Rodney by Joshua Reynolds

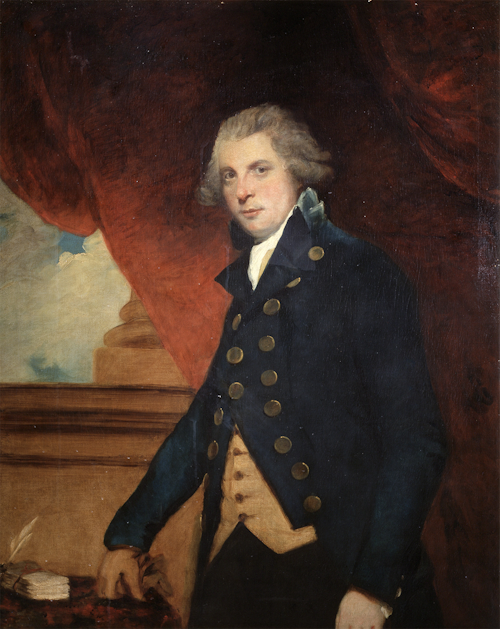
Portrait of Richard Brinsley Sheridan by Joshua Reynolds

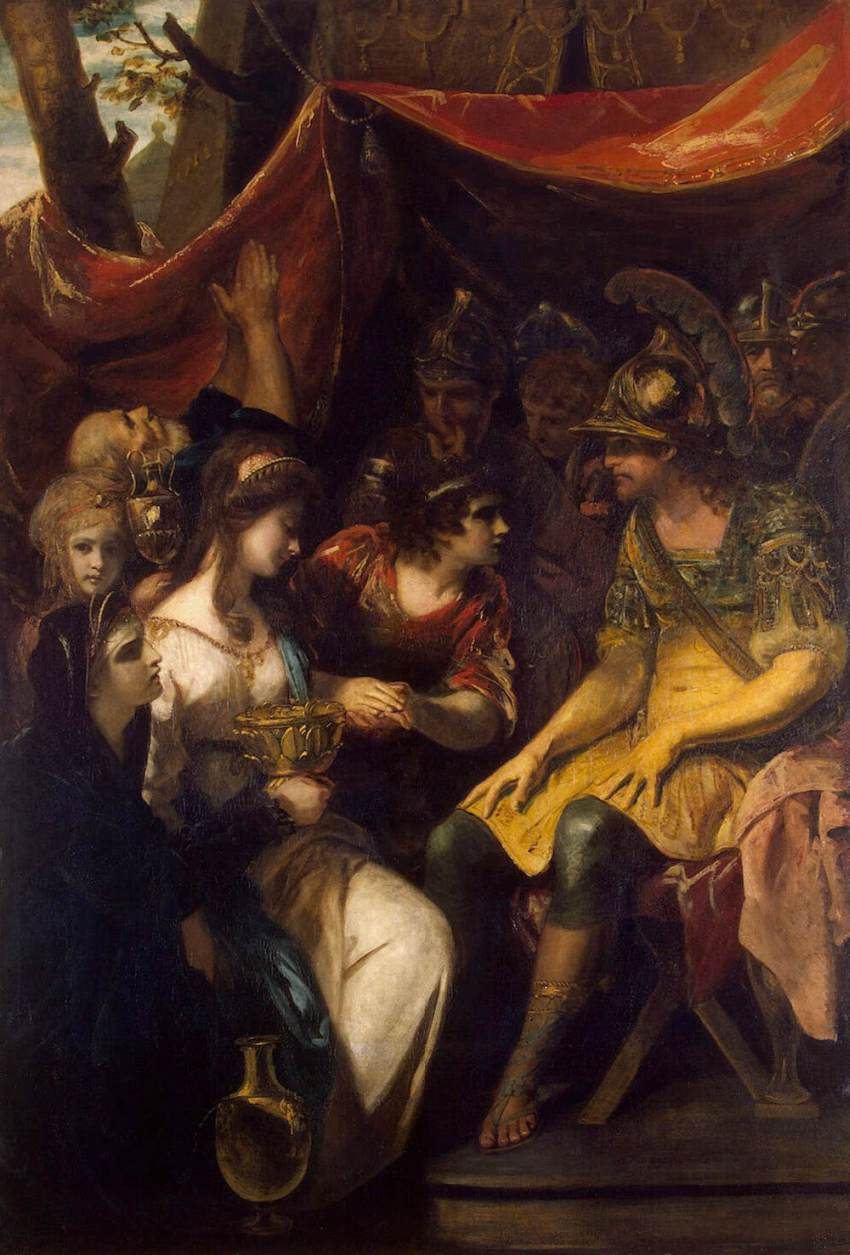
Continence of Scipio by Joshua Reynolds

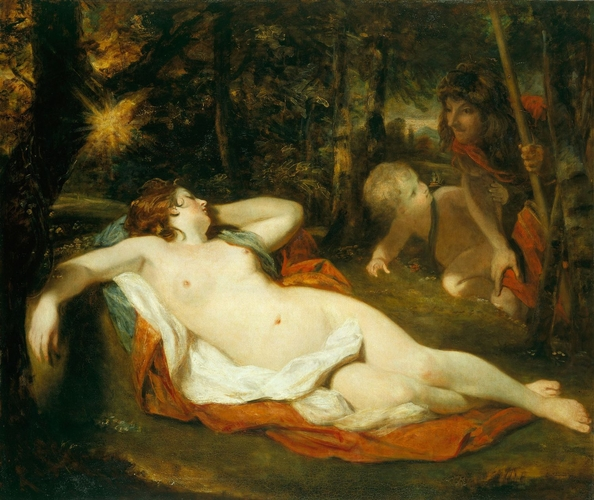
Cymon and Iphigenia by Joshua Reynolds

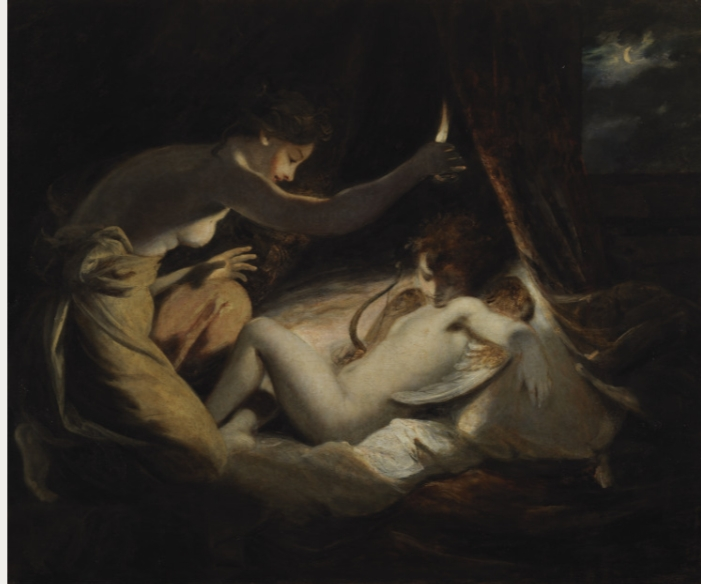
Cupid and Psyche by Joshua Reynolds

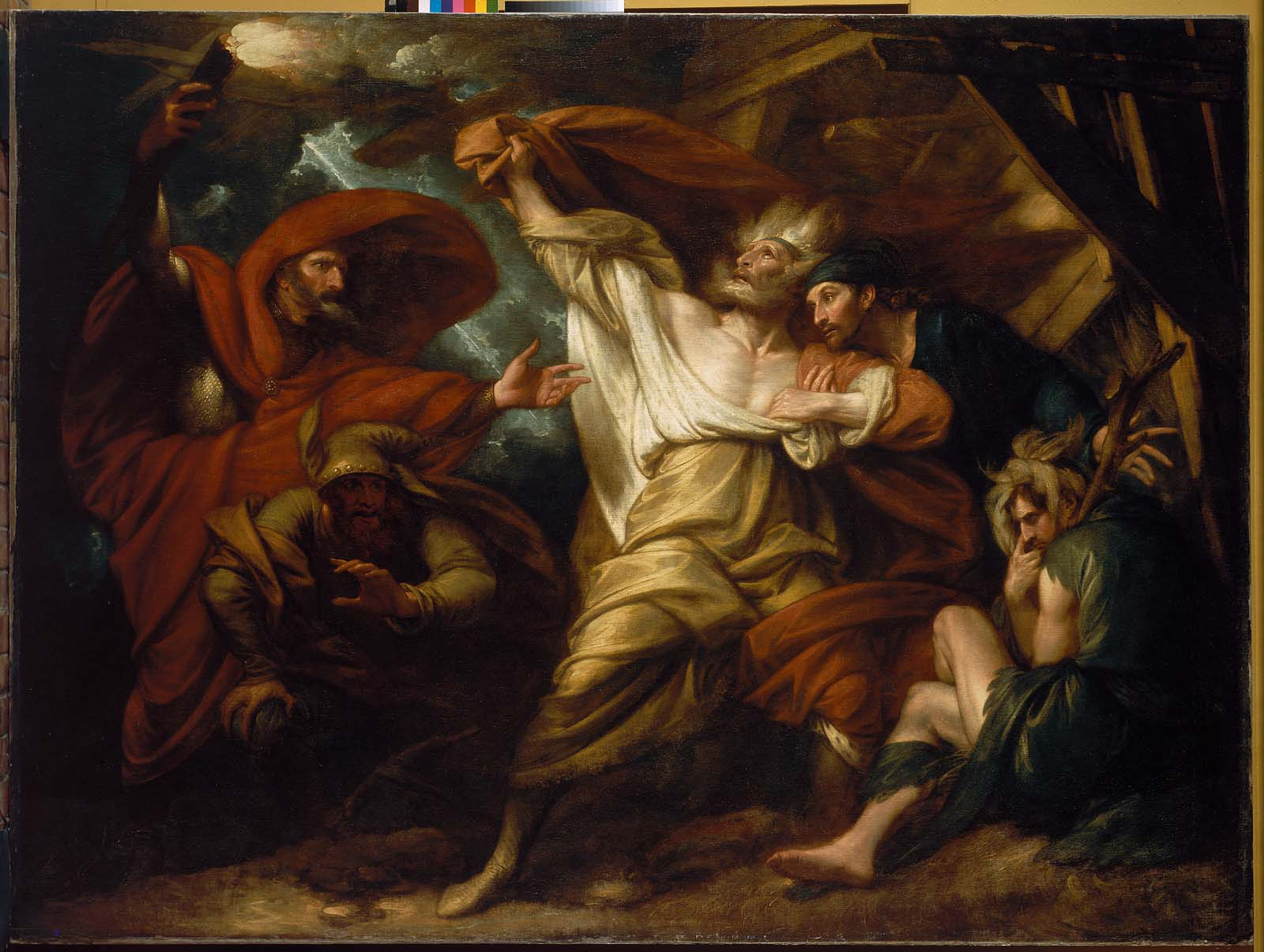
King Lear in the Storm by Benjamin West

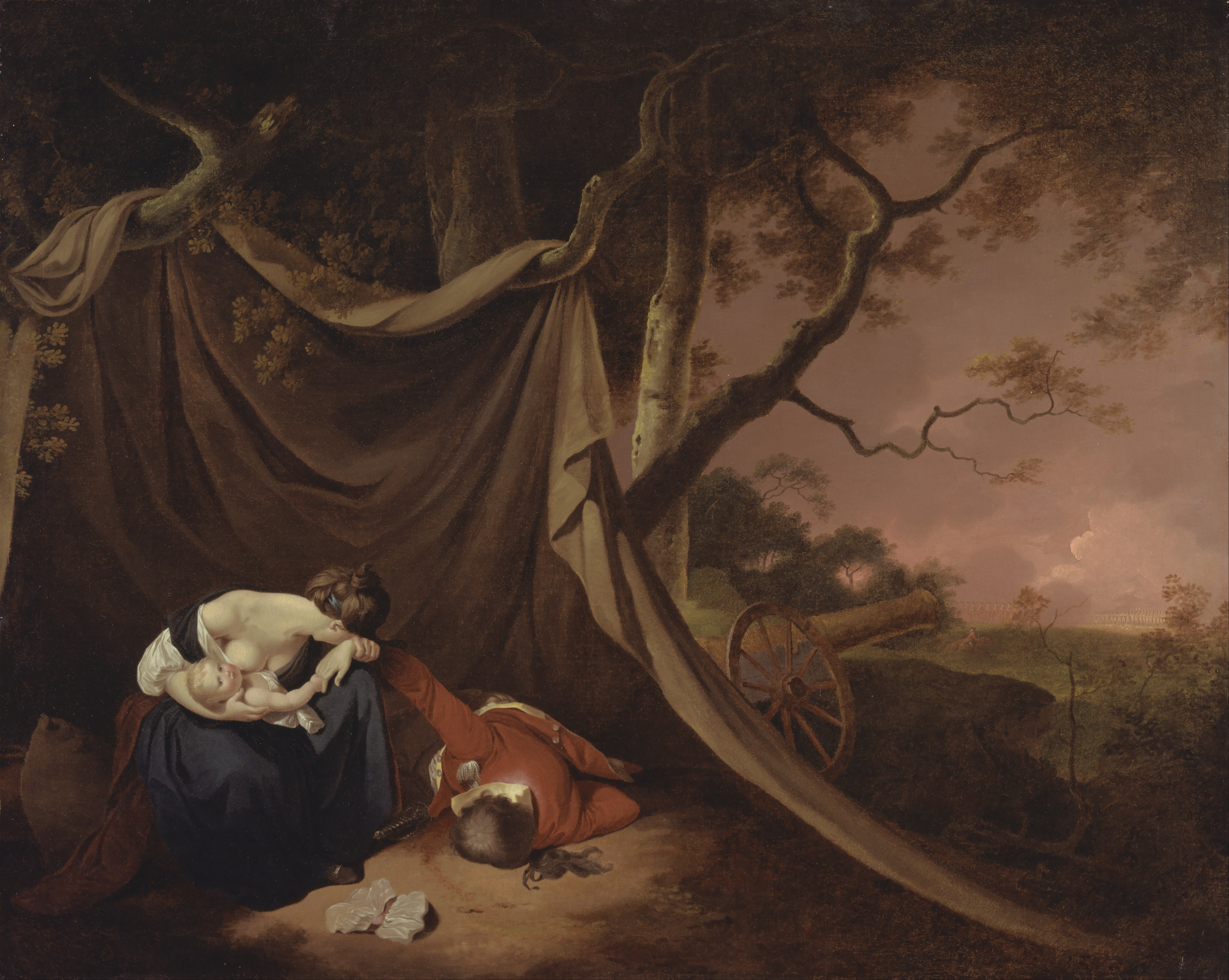
The Dead Soldier by Joseph Wright of Derby

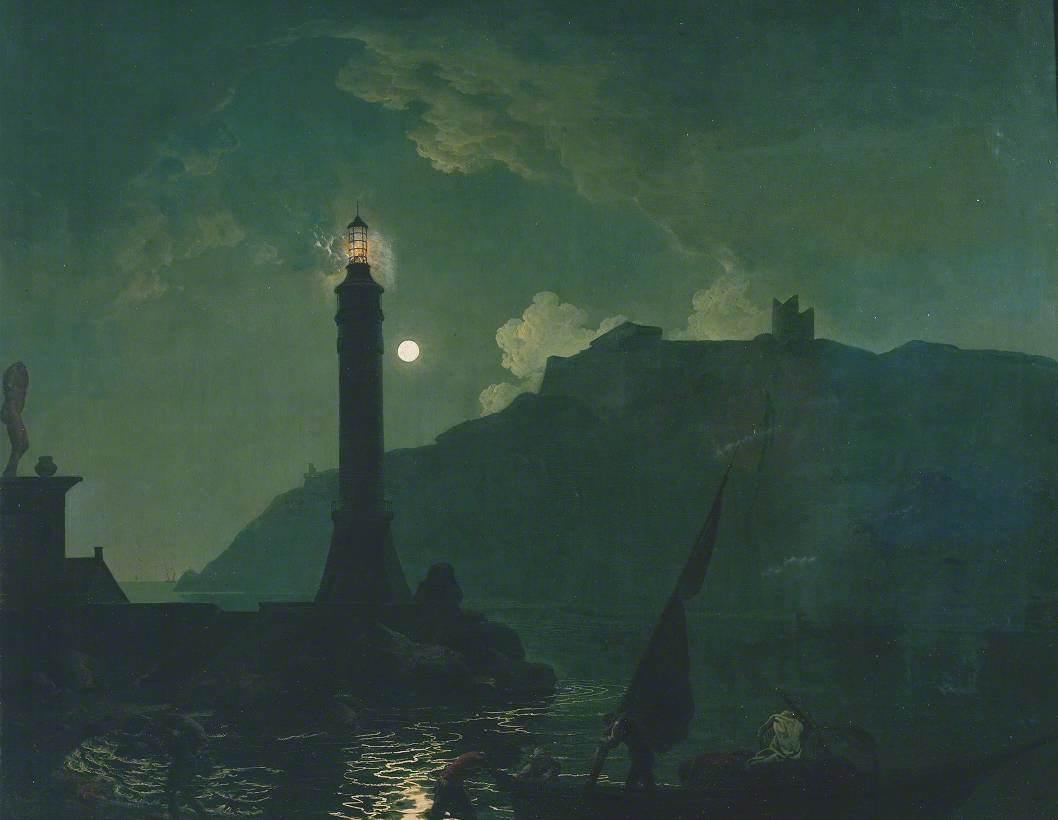
A Moonlight by Joseph Wright of Derby

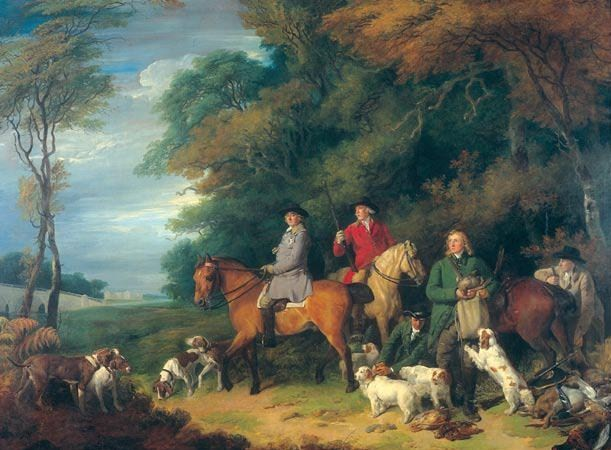
Returning from Shooting by Francis Wheatley

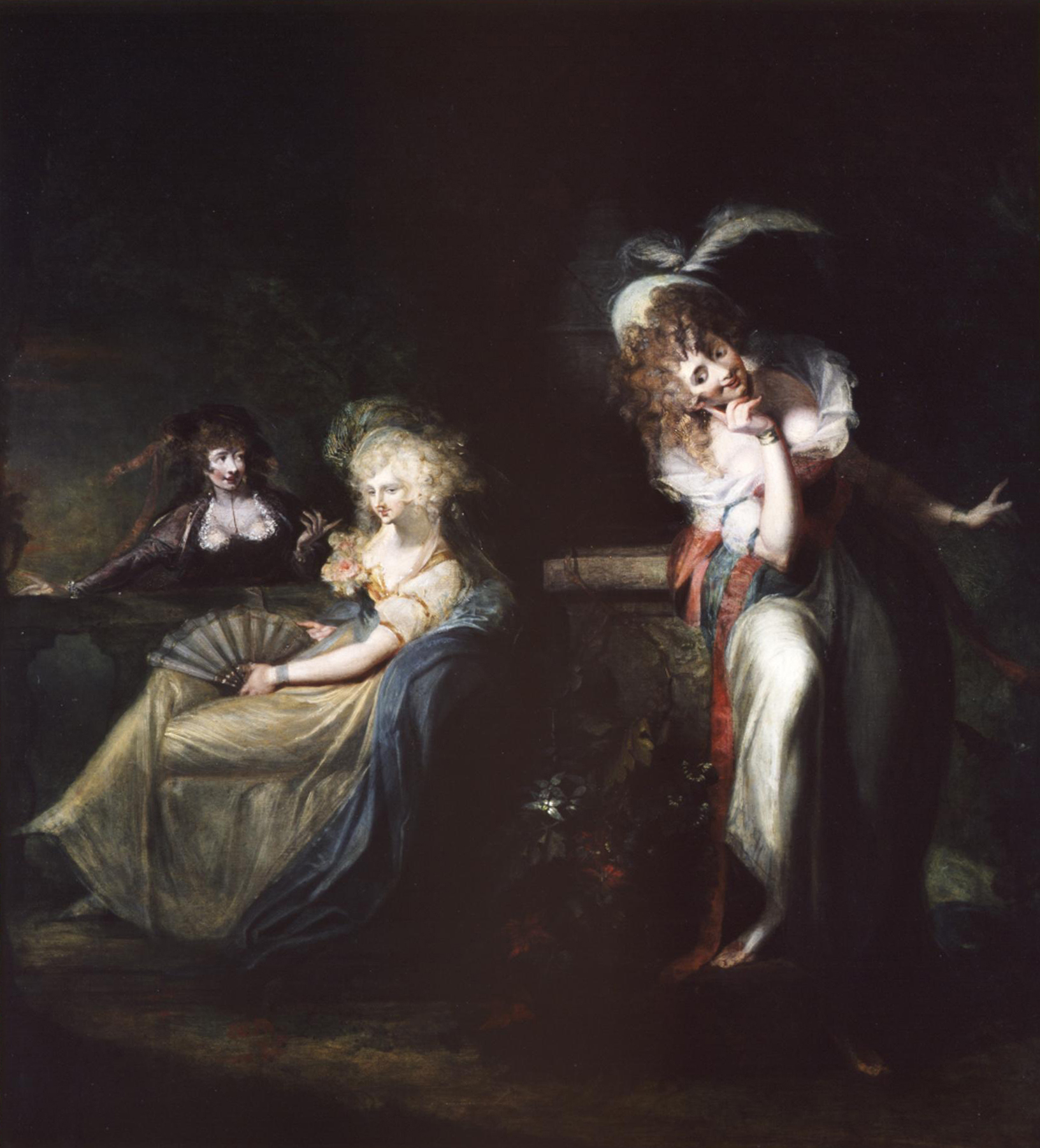
Beatrice by Henry Fuseli

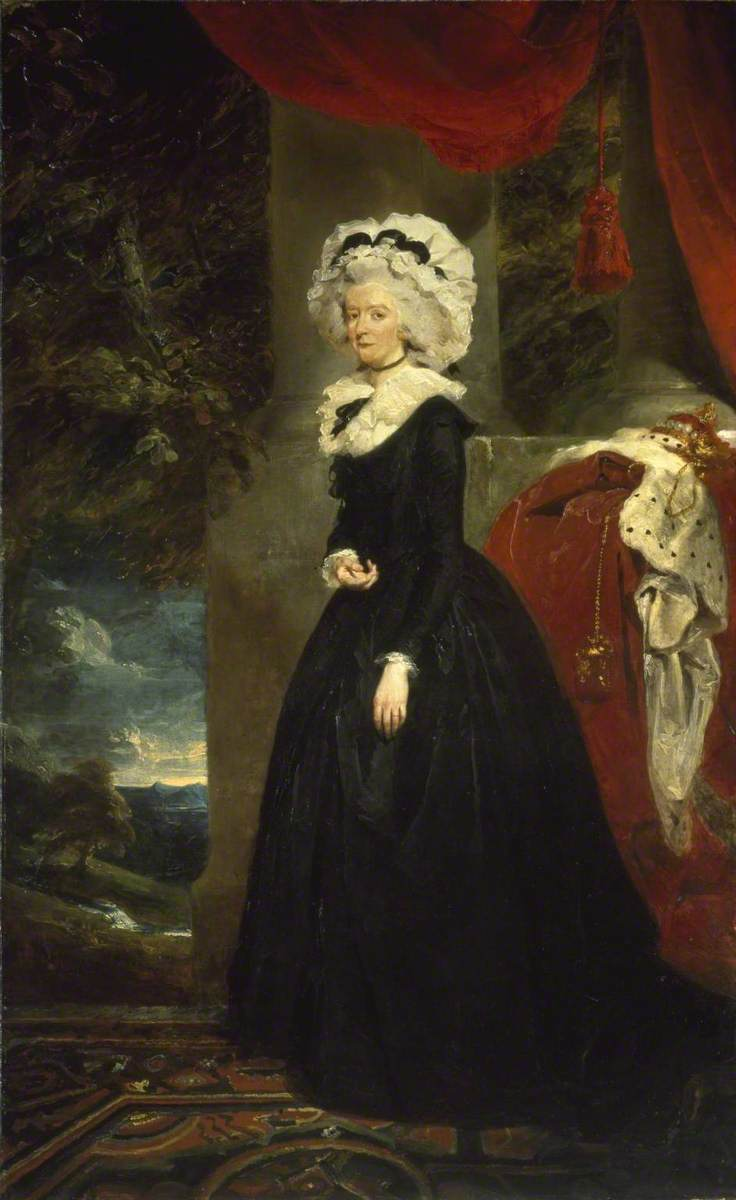
Viscountess Cremorne by Thomas Lawrence

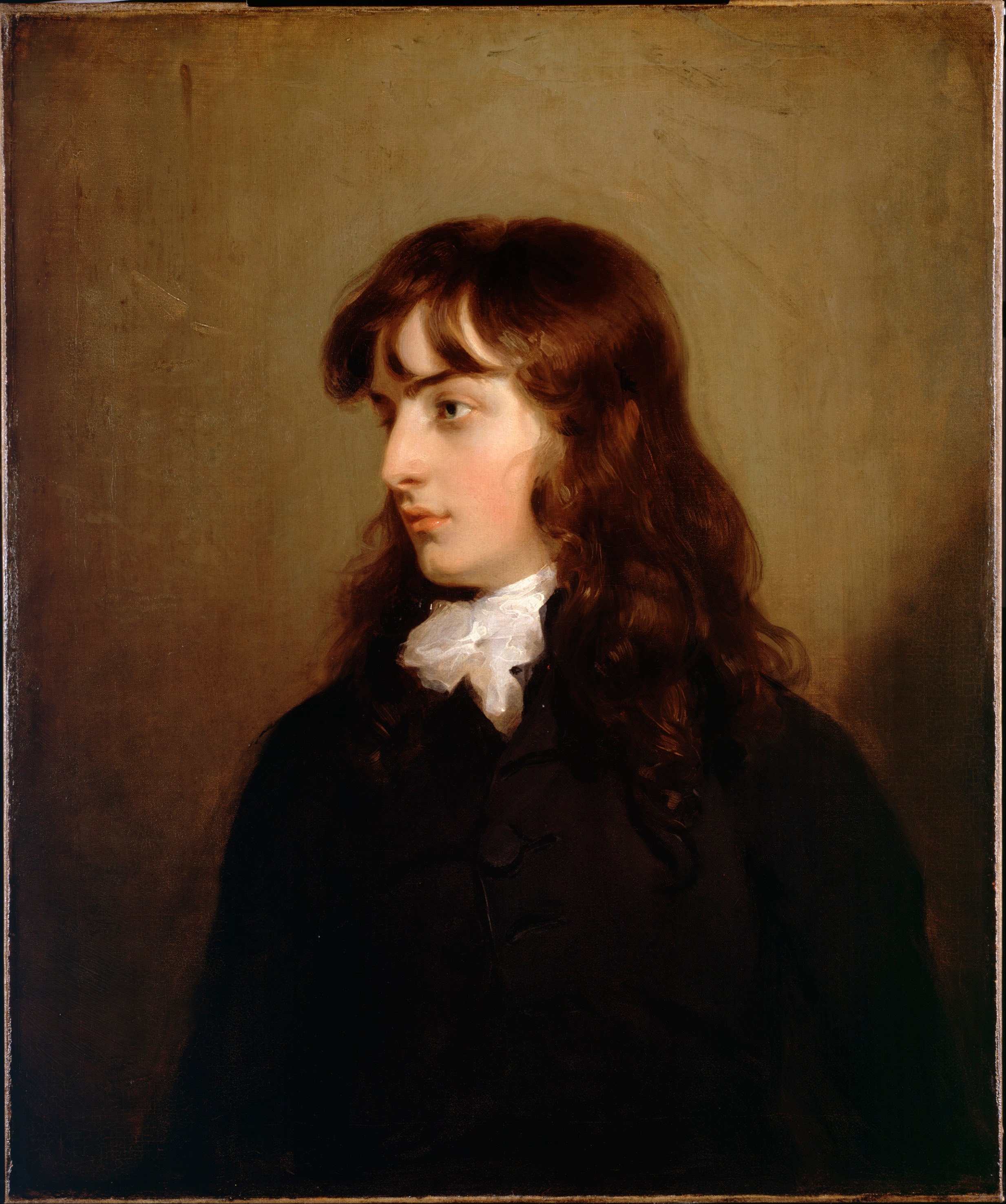
Portrait of William Linley by Thomas Lawrence

== See also ==
- Salon of 1789, a contemporary French exhibition held at the Louvre in Paris

== Bibliography ==
- Egerton, Judy. George Stubbs, Painter. Yale University Press, 2007.
- Levey, Michael. Sir Thomas Lawrence. Yale University Press, 2005.
- McIntyre, Ian. Joshua Reynolds: The Life and Times of the First President of the Royal Academy. Allen Lane, 2003.
- Wright, Amina. Thomas Lawrence: Coming of Age. Bloomsbury Publishing, 2020.
