= King Lear in the Storm =

Painting by Benjamin West

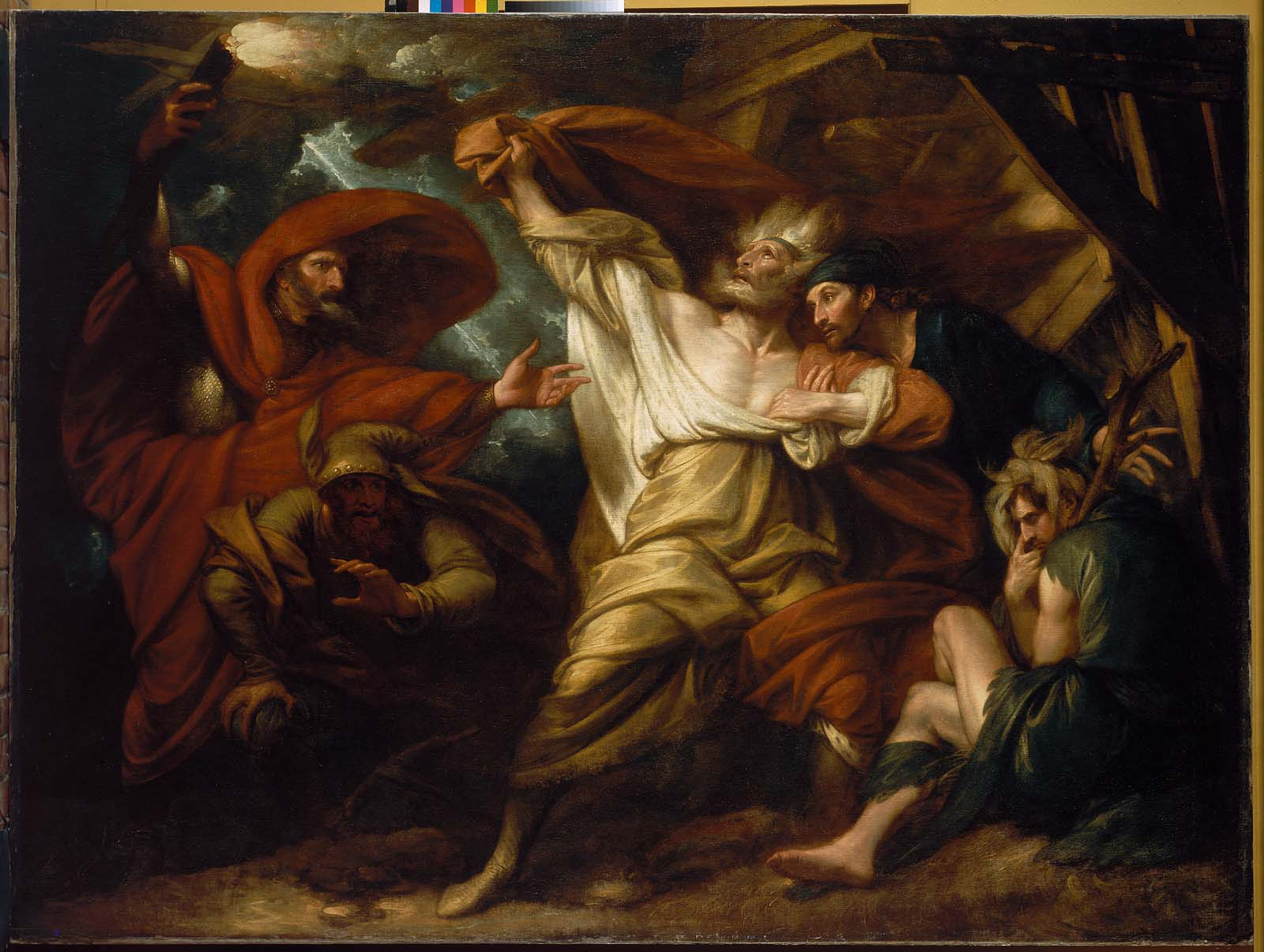
- Artist: Benjamin West
- Year: 1788
- Type: Oil on canvas, history painting
- Dimensions: 271.8 cm × 365.8 cm (107.0 in × 144.0 in)
- Location: Museum of Fine Arts, Boston

King Lear in the Storm is a 1788 oil on canvas history painting by the American-British artist Benjamin West. It depicts an episode from William Shakespeare's play King Lear. Drawn from Act 3, Scene 4 of the tragedy, it shows the king refusing to accept the hospitality of his scheming daughters and walking out on the moors during a storm. It marked a break from the Neoclassical style West had previously used and anticipated the emerging Romanticism movement. It is also known simply as King Lear, although the longer title distinguishes it from West's 1784 painting King Lear and Cordelia.

The Pennsylvania-born West had become known for his historical paintings, many of them commissioned by George III for Windsor Castle. This work was produced for the recently opened Boydell Shakespeare Gallery in London's Pall Mall and was considered one of the best works It featured. It was displayed at the Royal Academy Exhibition of 1789 at Somerset House. Today the painting is in the collection of the Museum of Fine Arts in Boston, having been acquired in 1979. An engraving was produced in 1793 by William Sharp.

== See also ==
- King Lear and the Fool in the Storm, an 1851 painting by William Dyce

== Bibliography ==
- Alberts, Robert C. Benjamin West: A Biography. Houghton Mifflin, 1978.
- Burwick, Frederick. Romantic Drama: Acting and Reacting. Cambridge University Press 2099.
- Grossman, Lloyd. Benjamin West and the Struggle to be Modern. Merrell Publishers, 2015.
- Sillars, Stuart. Shakespeare Seen: Image, Performance and Society. Cambridge University Press, 2018.
