= Oath of the Horatii =

1784 painting by Jacques-Louis David

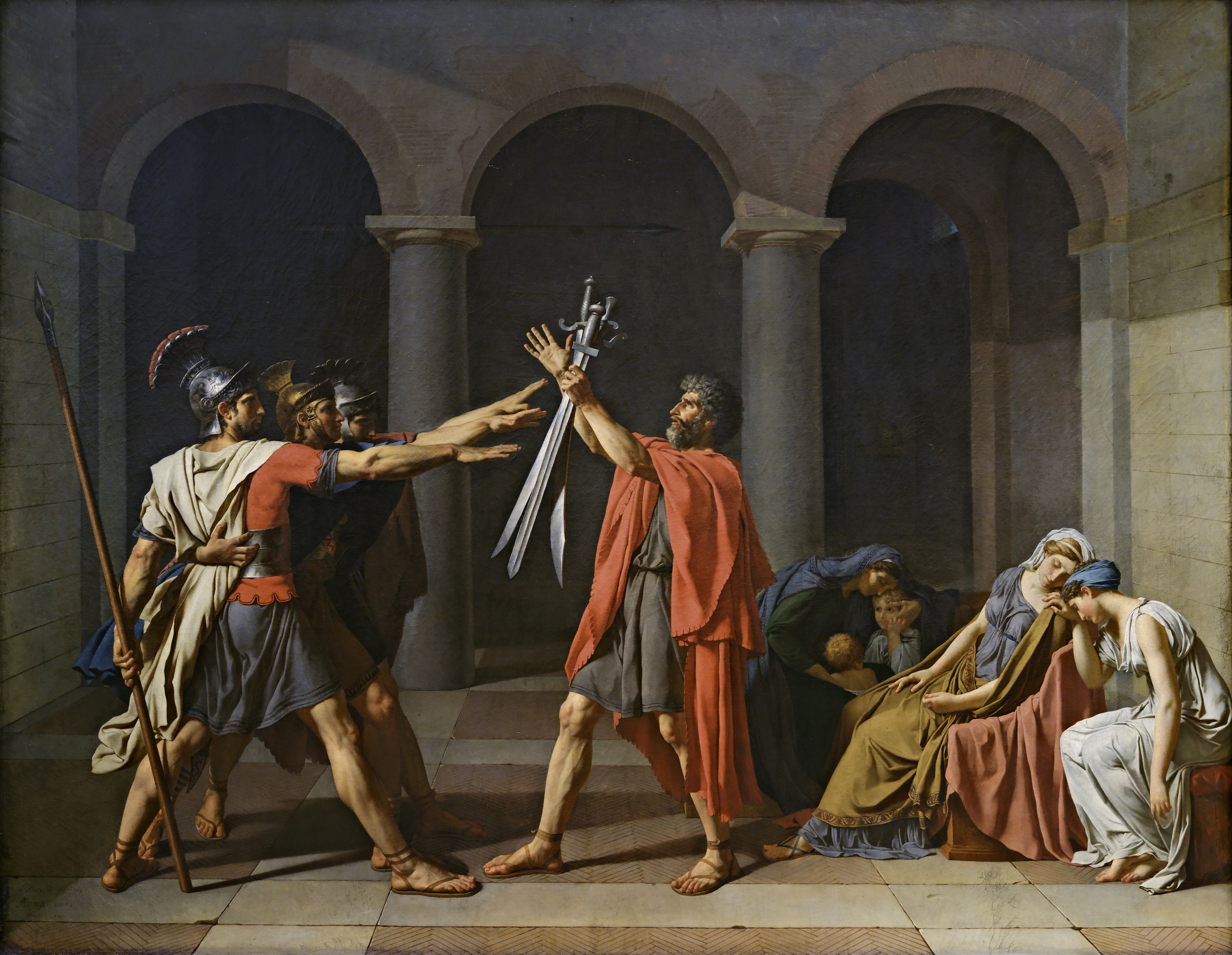
- Artist: Jacques-Louis David
- Year: 1784
- Medium: Oil on canvas
- Movement: Neoclassicism
- Dimensions: 329.8 cm × 424.8 cm (129.8 in × 167.2 in)
- Location: Louvre, Paris

Oath of the Horatii (French: Le Serment des Horaces (Note: pronounced [lə sɛʁmɑ̃ dez‿ɔʁas])) is a large painting by the French artist Jacques-Louis David painted in 1784 and 1785 and now on display in the Louvre in Paris. The painting immediately became a huge success with critics and the public and remains one of the best-known paintings in the Neoclassical style.

It depicts a scene from the story of the Horatii and Curiatii, a Roman legend about a seventh-century BC dispute between two warring cities, Rome and Alba Longa, and stresses the importance of patriotism and masculine self-sacrifice for one's country. Instead of the two cities sending their armies to war, they agree to choose three men from each city; the victor in that fight will be the victorious city. From Rome, three brothers from a Roman family, the Horatii, agree to end the war by fighting three brothers from a family of Alba Longa, the Curiatii. The three brothers, all of whom appear willing to sacrifice their lives for the good of Rome, are shown stretching their hands towards their father who holds their swords out to them. Of the three Horatii brothers, only one will survive the confrontation. However, it is the surviving brother who is able to kill the other three fighters from Alba Longa: he allows the three fighters to chase him, causing them to separate from each other, and then, in turn, kills each Curiatii brother. Aside from the three brothers depicted, David also represents, in the bottom right corner, a woman crying while sitting down. She is Camilla, a sister of the Horatii brothers, who is also betrothed to one of the Curiatii fighters, and thus she weeps in the realisation that, whatever happens, she will lose someone she loves. Seeing her weep over her dead betrothed, the surviving brother, Publius, kills Camilla for weeping over the enemy.

The principal sources for the story behind David's Oath are the first book of Livy (sections 24–26) which was elaborated by Dionysius in book 3 of his Roman Antiquities. However, the moment depicted in David's painting is his own invention.

It grew to be considered a paragon of neoclassical art. The painting increased David's fame, allowing him to take on his own students.

== Commissioning the work ==
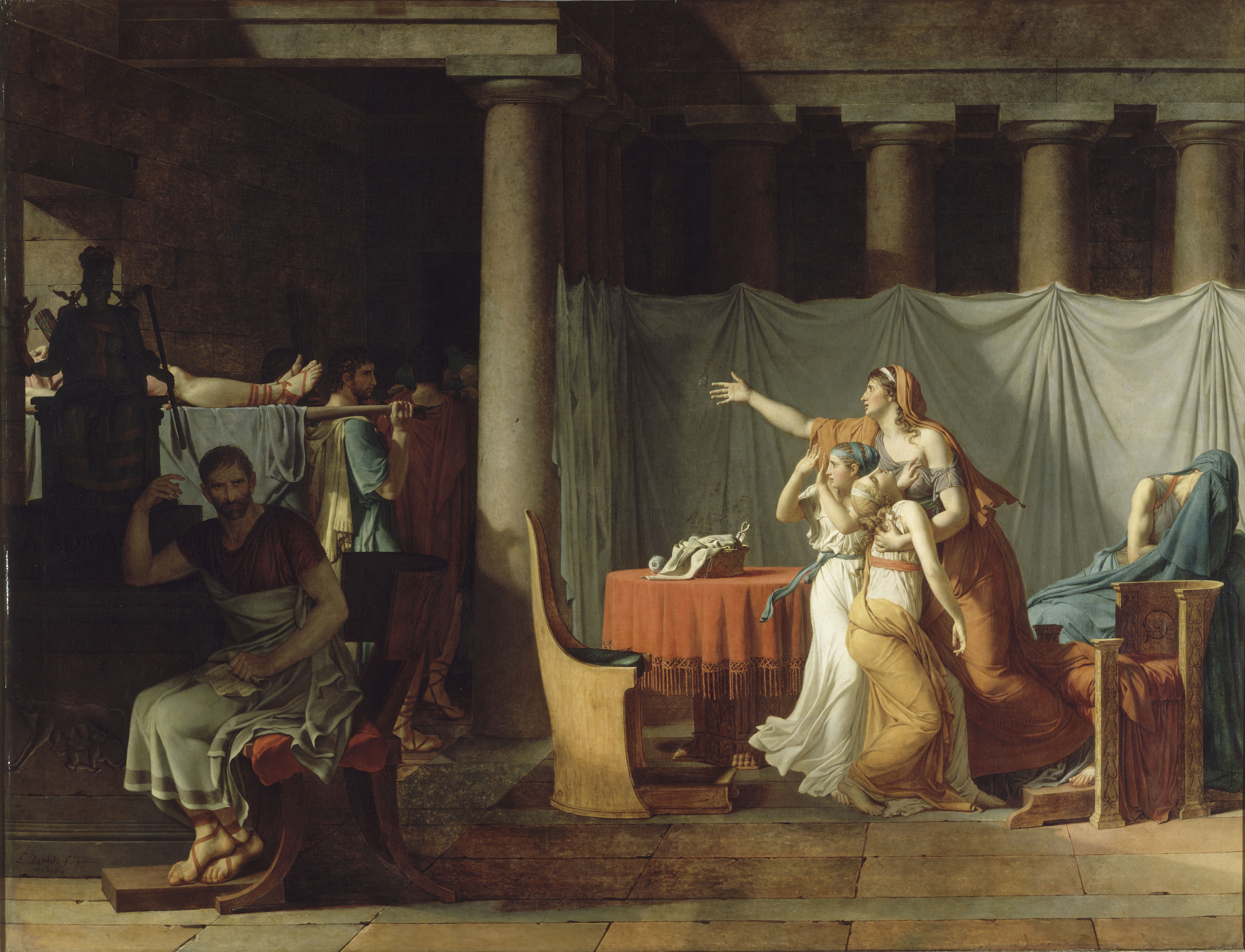
David's The Lictors Bring to Brutus the Bodies of His Sons, 1789

In 1774, David won the Prix de Rome with his work Érasistrate découvrant la cause de la Maladie d’Antiochius. This allowed him to stay five years (1775–1780) in Rome as a student of the French government. Upon his return to Paris, he exhibited his work, which Diderot greatly admired; the success was so resounding that King Louis XVI of France allowed him to stay in the Louvre, a privilege greatly desired by artists. There he met Pecoul, the contractor for the actual buildings, and Pecoul's daughter, whom he married. The king's assistant, Charles-Claude Flahaut de la Billaderie, commissioned Oath of the Horatii with the intention that it be an allegory about loyalty to the state and therefore to the king. Nevertheless, David departed from the agreed-upon scene, painting this scene instead. Although the painting studies were begun in Paris, it was not painted in Paris, but in Rome, where David was visited by his pupil Jean-Germaine Drouais who had himself recently won the Prix de Rome. Ultimately, David's picture manifests a progressive outlook, deeply influenced by Enlightenment ideas, that eventually contributed to the overthrow of the monarchy. As the French Revolution approached, paintings increasingly referred to loyalty to the state rather than the family or the church. Painted five years before the Revolution, the Oath of the Horatii reflects the political tensions of the period.

In 1789, David painted The Lictors Bring to Brutus the Bodies of His Sons, a picture that was also a royal commission. Shortly afterward, the king went up to the scaffold also accused of treason, as the sons of Brutus, and with the vote of the artist in the National Assembly, which supported the execution of Louis XVI.

== Symbolic theme ==
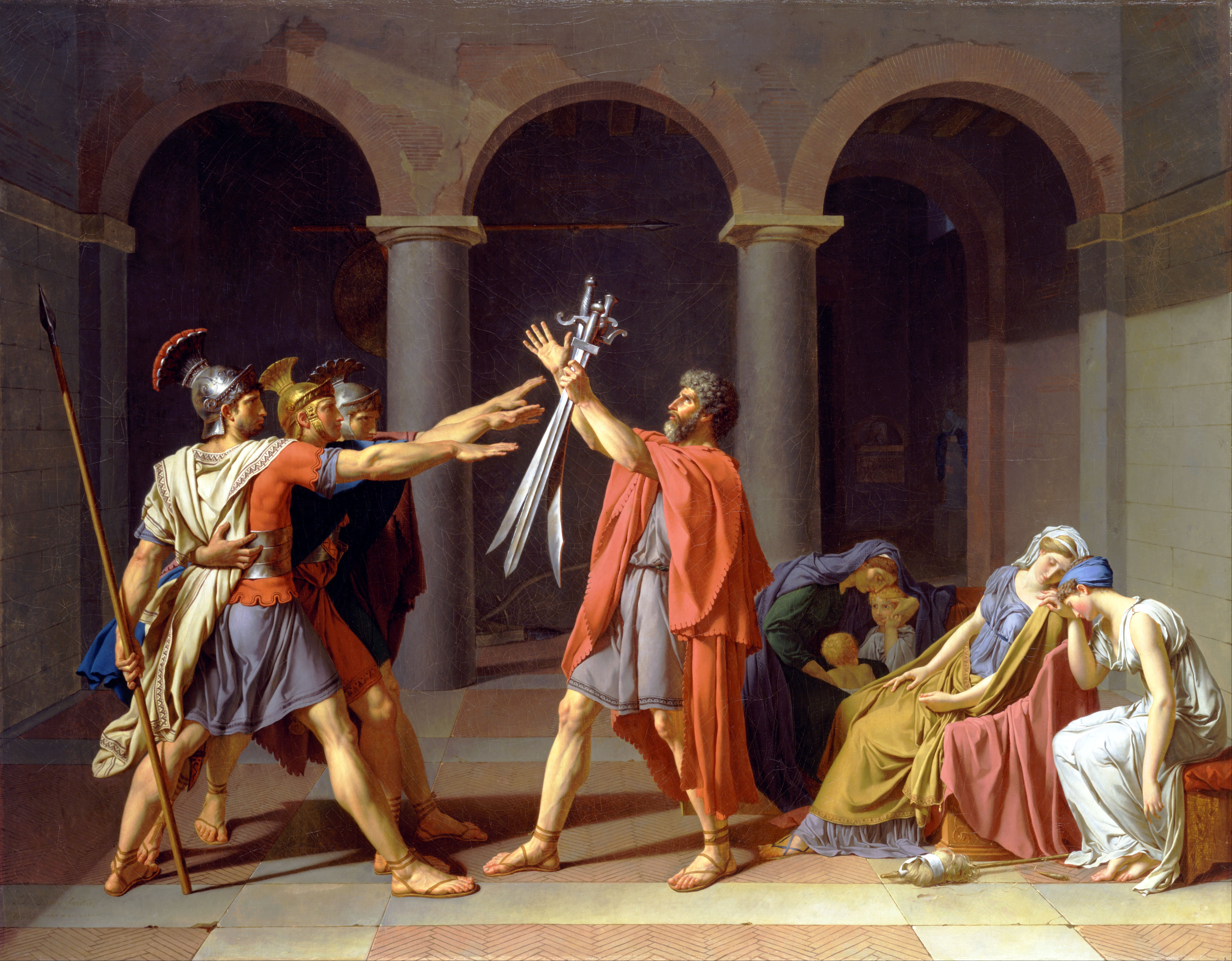
Oath of the Horatii, a second smaller version painted in 1786 by David and his pupil Girodet, now in Toledo, Ohio

The painting depicts the Roman Horatius family, who, according to Titus Livius' Ab Urbe Condita (From the Founding of the City) had been chosen for a ritual duel against three members of the Curiatii, a family from Alba Longa, in order to settle disputes between the Romans and the latter city.

As revolution in France loomed, paintings urging loyalty to the state rather than to clan or clergy abounded. Although it was painted nearly four years before the revolution in France, The Oath of the Horatii became one of the defining images of the time. In the painting, the three brothers express their loyalty and solidarity with Rome before battle, wholly supported by their father. These are men willing to lay down their lives out of patriotic duty. With their resolute gaze and taut, outstretched limbs, they are citadels of patriotism. They are symbols of the highest virtues of Rome. Their clarity of purpose, mirrored by David's simple yet powerful use of tonal contrasts, lends the painting, and its message about the nobility of patriotic sacrifice, an electric intensity. This is all in contrast to the tender-hearted women who lie weeping and mourning, awaiting the results of the fighting.

The mother and sisters are shown clothed in silken garments seemingly melting into tender expressions of sorrow. Their despair is partly because one sister was engaged to one of the Curiatii and another is a sister of the Curiatii, married to one of the Horatii. Upon the defeat of the Curiatii, the remaining Horatius journeyed home to find his sister cursing Rome over the death of her fiancé. He killed her, horrified that Rome was being cursed. Originally David had intended to depict this episode, and a drawing survives showing the surviving Horatius raising his sword, with his sister lying dead. David later decided that this subject was too gruesome a way of sending the message of public duty overcoming private feeling, but his next major painting, The Lictors Bring to Brutus the Bodies of His Sons depicted a similar scene - Lucius Junius Brutus brooding as the bodies of his sons, whose executions for treason he had ordered, are returned home. This was a subject the tragedy Brutus by Voltaire had made familiar to the French.

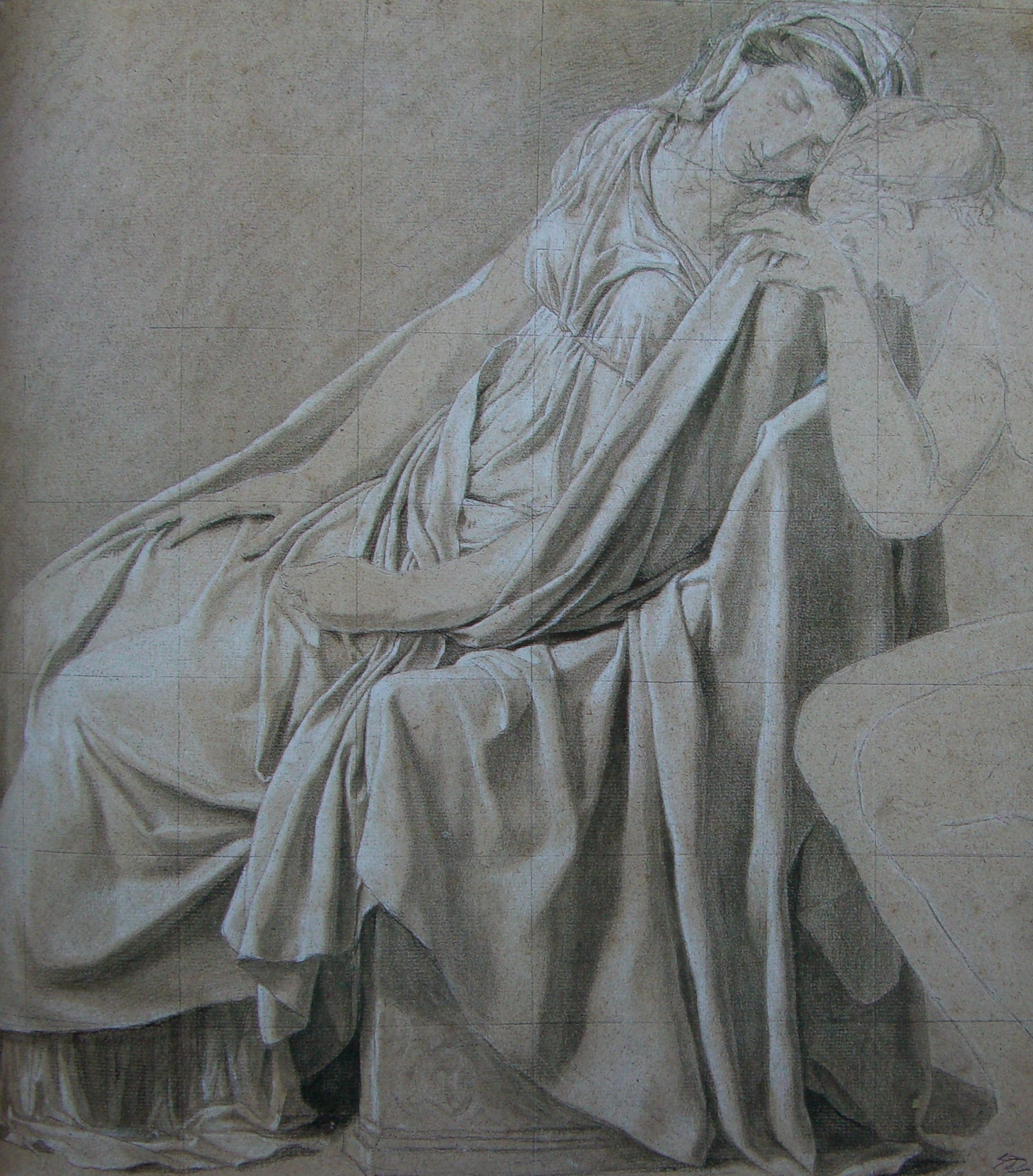
Study for Camilla, black chalk and white highlights

The painting shows the three brothers on the left, the Horatii father in the center, and the three women along with two children on the right. The Horatii brothers are depicted swearing upon (saluting) their swords as they take their oath. The men show no sense of emotion. Even the father, who holds up three swords, shows no emotion. On the right, three women are weeping—one in the back and two up closer. The woman dressed in the white is a Horatius weeping for both her Curiatii fiancé and her brother; the one dressed in brown is a Curiatius who weeps for her Horatii husband and her brother. The background woman in black holds two children—one of whom is the child of a Horatius male and his Curiatii wife. The younger daughter hides her face in her nanny's dress as the son refuses to have his eyes shielded. According to Thomas Le Claire:

This painting occupies an extremely important place in the body of David’s work and in the history of French painting. The story was taken from Livy. We are in the period of the wars between Rome and Alba, in 669 B.C. It has been decided that the dispute between the two cities must be settled by an unusual form of combat to be fought by two groups of three champions each. The two groups are the three Horatii brothers and the three Curiatii brothers. The drama lay in the fact that one of the sisters of the Curiatii, Sabina, is married to one of the Horatii, while one of the sisters of the Horatii, Camilla, is betrothed to one of the Curiatii. Despite the ties between the two families, the Horatii's father exhorts his sons to fight the Curiatii and they obey, despite the lamentations of the women.

== Compositional technique ==
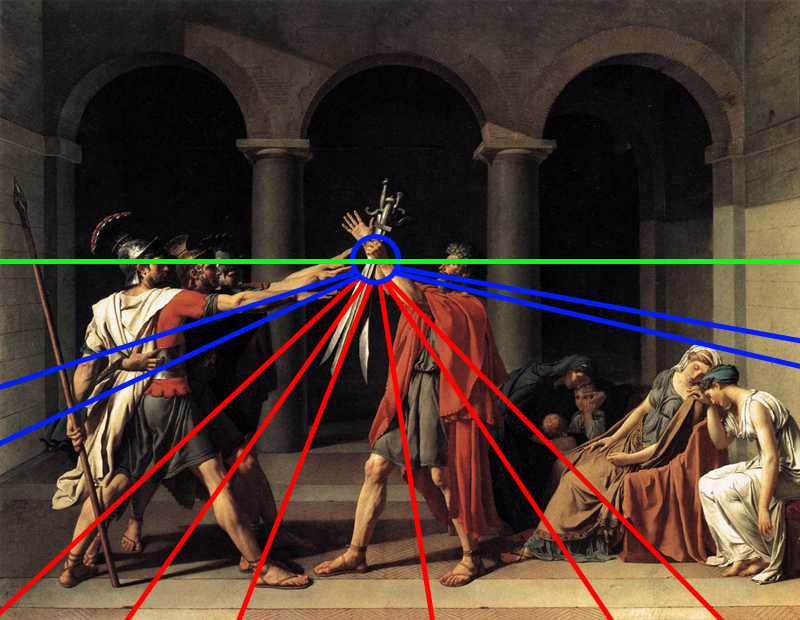
Schematic showing the convergence of many elements in the composition at the central point

This painting shows the neoclassical art style, and employs various techniques that were typical of it:

- The background is de-emphasized, while the figures in the foreground are emphasized.
- Overlapping ranks of profile figures are a common motif in classical art, and that of ancient Near Eastern cultures.
- The central point of the hand clasping the swords is placed in front of the vanishing point of the perspective scheme, which is emphasized by the straight lines of the edges of the wall blocks and floor slabs of the architectural setting leading to it (see schematic).
- The use of dull colors is to show the importance of the story behind the painting over the painting itself.
- The picture is organized, depicting the symbolism of the number three and of the moment itself.
- The focus on clear, hard details and the lack of use of the more wispy brushstrokes preferred by Rococo art.
- The brushstrokes are invisible, and the painter's technique is not displayed as a distraction from the subject
- The men are all depicted with straight lines mirroring the columns in the background signifying their rigidity and strength while the women are all curved like the arches which are held up by the columns.
- The use of straight lines to depict strength is also demonstrated in the swords, two of which are curved while one is straight, perhaps foreshadowing that only one brother would survive the encounter.
- The frozen quality of the painting is also intended to emphasize rationality, unlike the Rococo style.
- That it depicts a morally uplifting story, promoting civic duty over the personal, reflects the values of the Age of Enlightenment and neoclassical idealism.

=== Comparisons ===
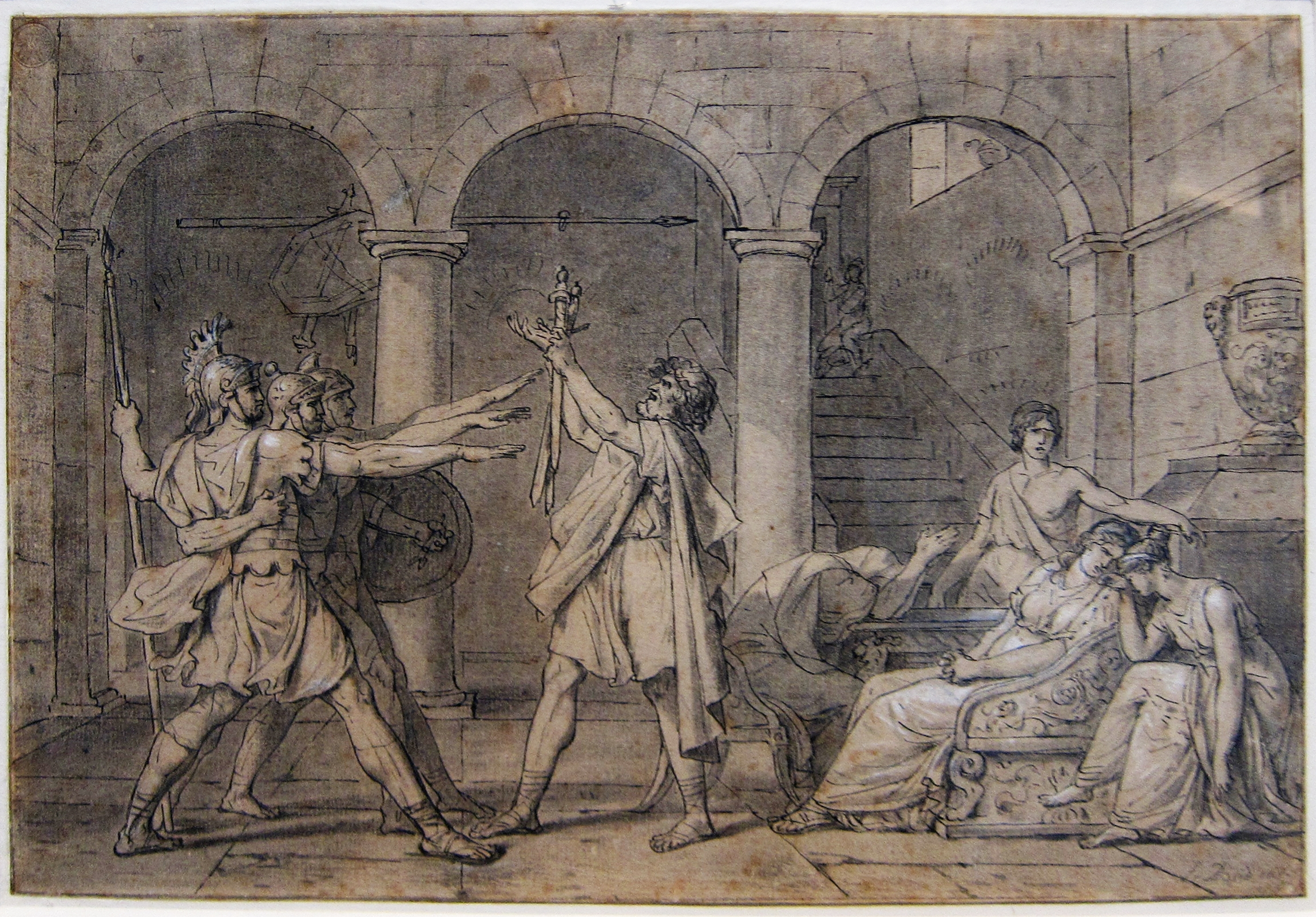
Study by David, drawing

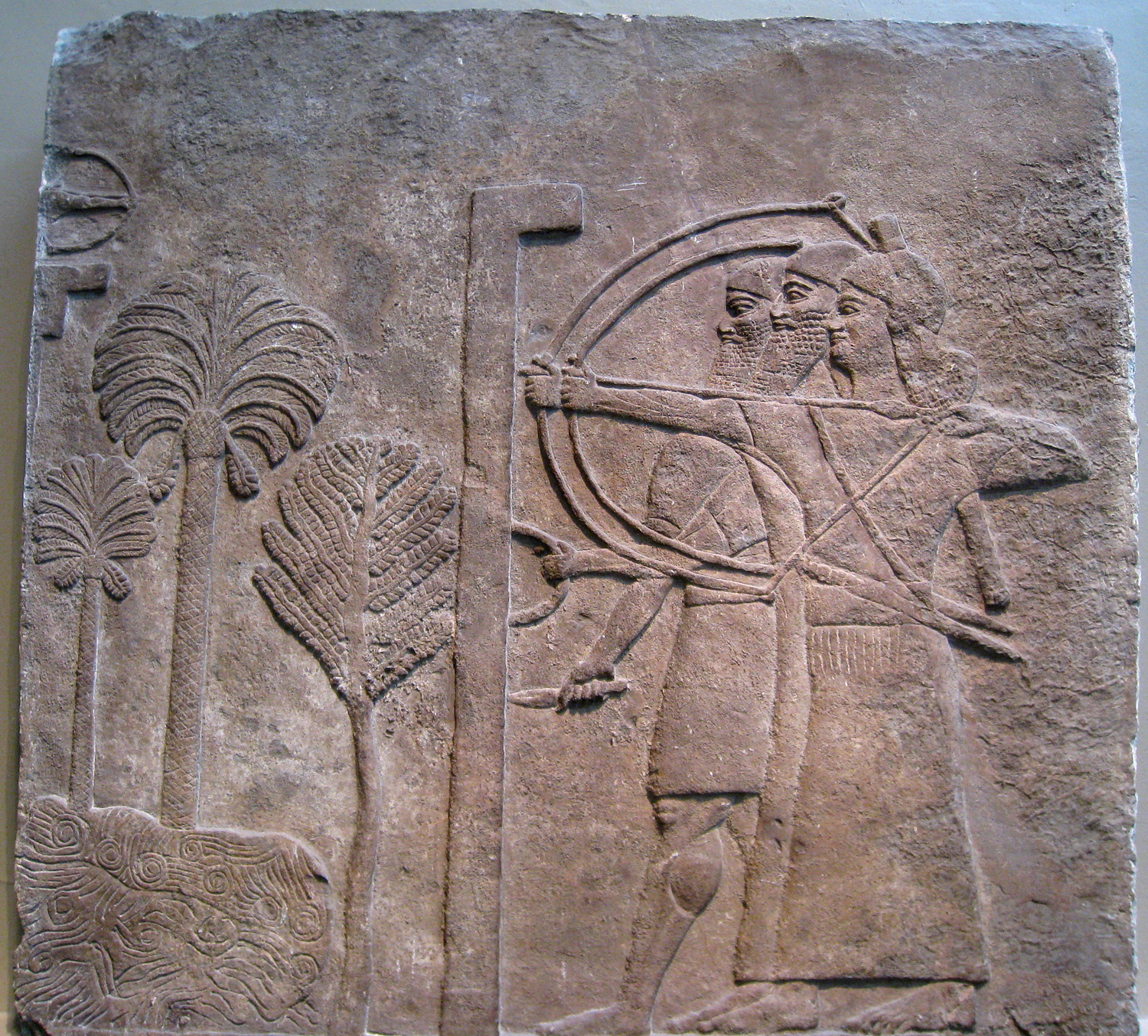
Assyrian archers, from a relief of about 728 BC, British Museum

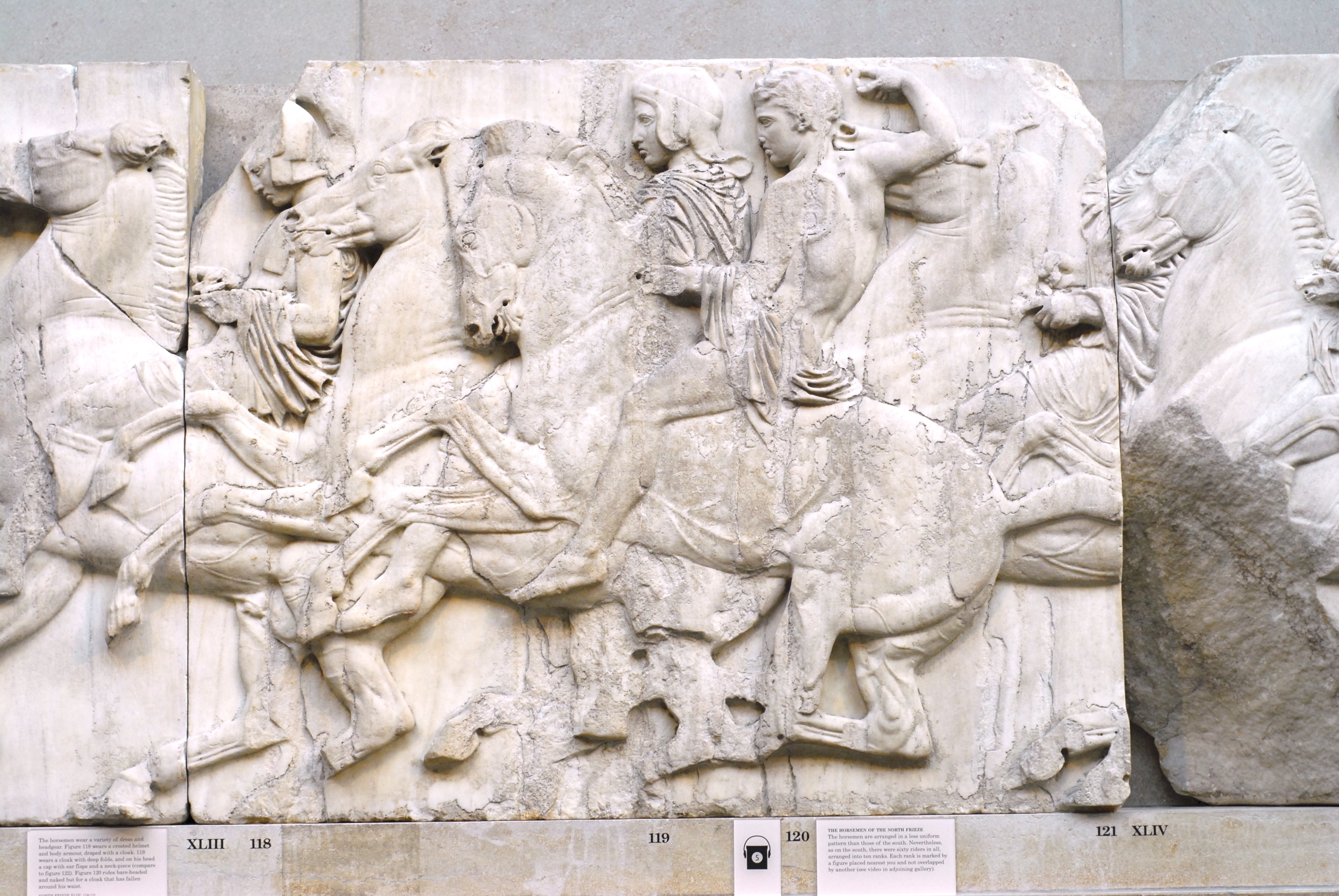
Overlapping riders in profile, from the Parthenon Frieze

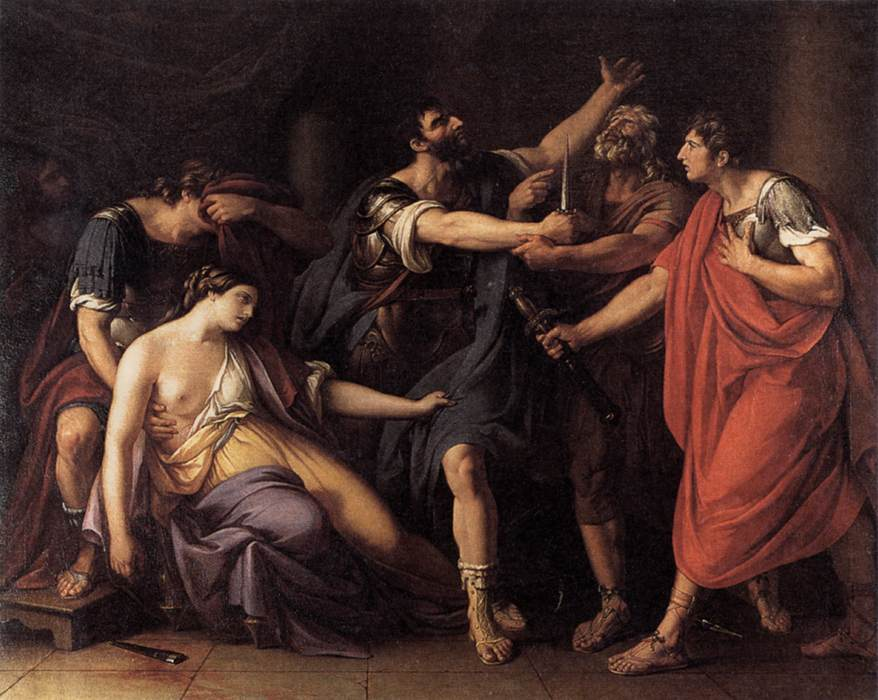
Gavin Hamilton, The oath of Brutus, 1763–64

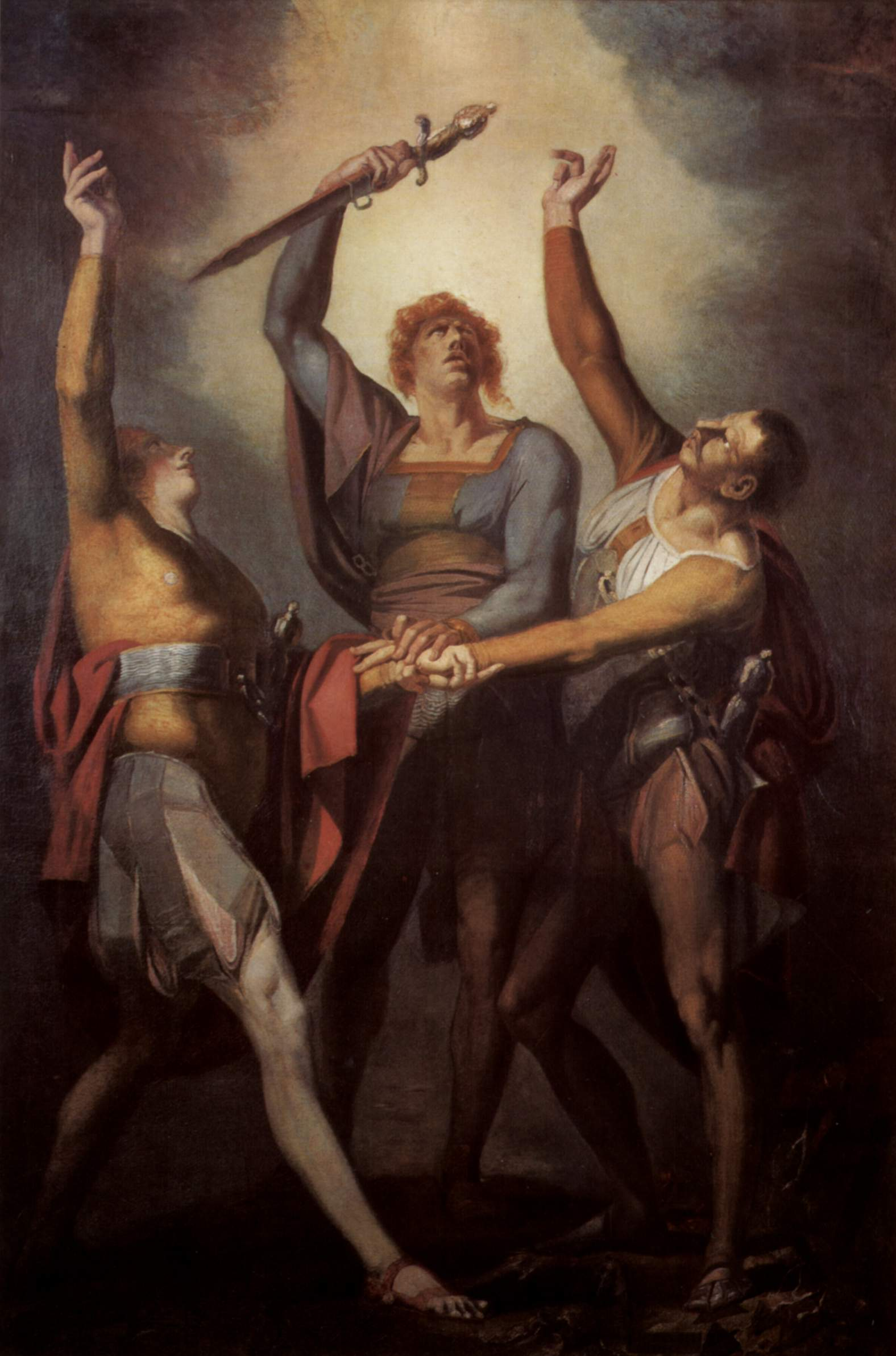
Johann Heinrich Füssli, the Rütlischwur, an oath from medieval Swiss history, 1780

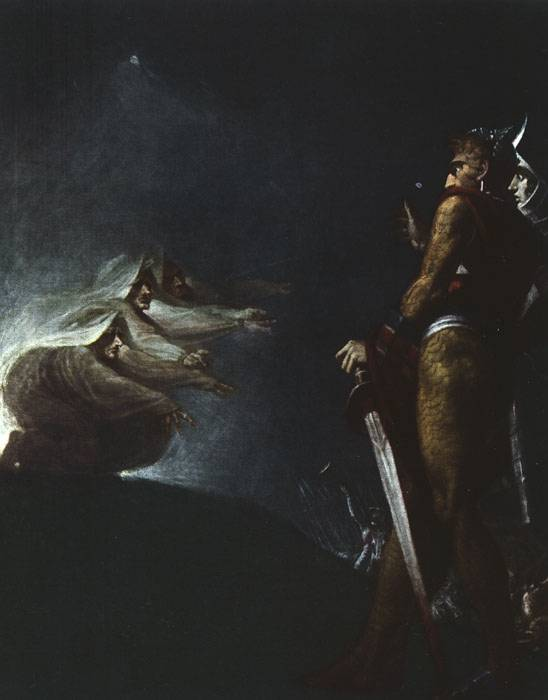
Johann Heinrich Füssli, Macbeth and Banquo with the witches, 1793–64

El Tres de Mayo, by Francisco de Goya, making a very different use of a file of men in profile, 1814.

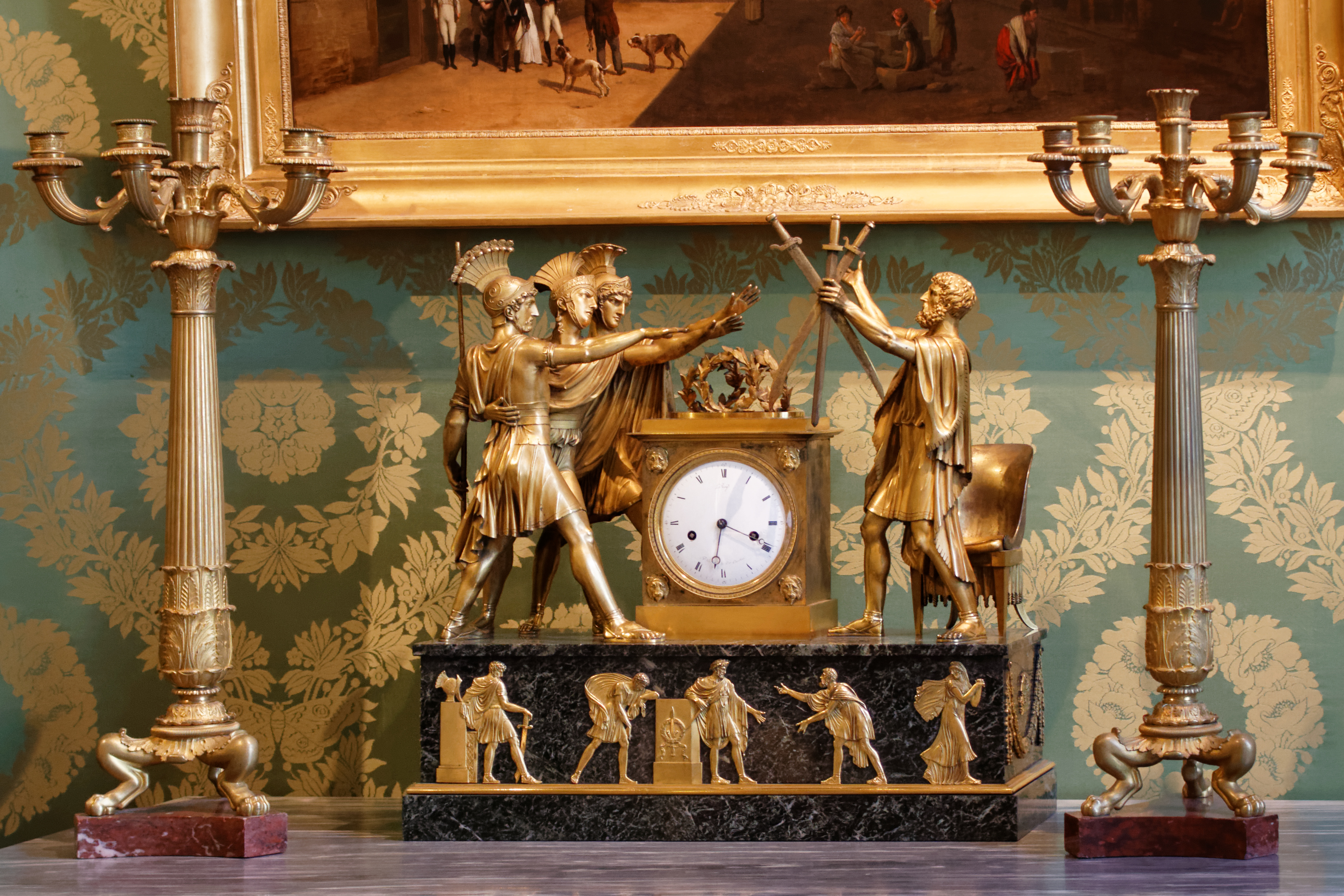
Mantel clock version, Carnavalet Museum, Paris

== Reception ==
David first exhibited the painting in Rome, where even the Pope requested a viewing.

The painting was exhibited in France at the Salon of 1785, but it was delivered late. David's enemies at the Academy took advantage of the delay to exhibit the painting in a poor locale in the gallery. The public's dissatisfaction with the painting's poor viewing conditions obliged the gallery to move it to a more prominent location.

== Fascist connotations ==
The three brothers in the painting are each raising and extending one of their arms forward, with palms facing downward. This became the basis for the Roman Salute, which would be then used to signify allegiance to fascist Italy and later the Nazi Party.

== See also ==
- List of paintings by Jacques-Louis David
