= King Lear and the Fool in the Storm =

Painting by William Dyce

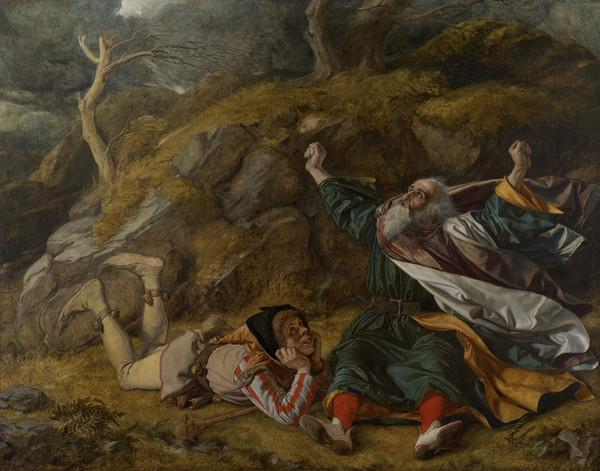
- Artist: William Dyce
- Year: 1851
- Type: Oil on canvas, genre painting
- Dimensions: 136 cm × 173 cm (54 in × 68 in)
- Location: Scottish National Gallery, Edinburgh

King Lear and the Fool in the Storm is an 1851 oil painting by the British artist William Dyce. It depicts a scene from William Shakespeare's 1606 tragedy King Lear. Lear is shown on the moors during a raging storm, accompanied by the fool. The painting was seen as resembling those that had appeared in the Boydell Shakespeare Gallery during the late eighteenth century.

Dyce was a prominent British artist whose style has been regarded as a precursor to the Pre-Raphaelite Brotherhood and one of the few established painters who responded to their type of art in works such as this. The picture was displayed at the Royal Academy Exhibition of 1851 held at the National Gallery in London. Today it is part of the collection of the Scottish National Gallery, which acquired it in 1993.

== See also ==
- King Lear in the Storm, a 1788 painting by Benjamin West

== Bibliography ==
- Martineau, Jane. Shakespeare in Art. Merrell, 2003.
- Pointon, Marcia R. William Dyce, 1806-1864: A Critical Biography. Oxford University Press, 1979.
