= Portrait of Madame Perregaux =

Painting by Élisabeth Vigée Le Brun

- Artist: Élisabeth Vigée Le Brun
- Year: 1789
- Type: Oil on panel, portrait painting
- Dimensions: 99.6 cm × 78.5 cm (39.2 in × 30.9 in)
- Location: Wallace Collection; London

Portrait of Madame Perregaux is a 1789 portrait painting by the French artist Élisabeth Vigée Le Brun. It depicts Adélaïde, the wife of the French banker Jean-François Perregaux. It was one of the final paintings that Le Brun produced before the outbreak of the French Revolution. A leading artist during the Ancien régime, she went abroad and spent many years working in a variety of countries. After she had left Paris, her art dealer husband submitted the painting to the Salon of 1791 at the Louvre. Both the style of the painting and the choice to produce it as an oil on panel work reflect Le Brun's admiration for the Old Master Peter Paul Rubens. Today the work is in the Wallace Collection in London's Manchester Square, having been acquired by the Marquess of Hertford around 1863.

== Bibliography ==
- Baillio Joseph, Baetjer, Katharine & Lang, Paul. (ed.) Vigée Le Brun : Woman Artist in Revolutionary France. Metropolitan Museum of Art, 2016.
- Helm, W.H. Elisabeth Louise Vigée-Lebrun. Parkstone International, 2018.
- May, Gita. Elisabeth Vigée Le Brun: The Odyssey of an Artist in an Age of Revolution. Yale University Press, 2008.
