= The Bastille During the First Days of its Demolition =

Painting by Hubert Robert

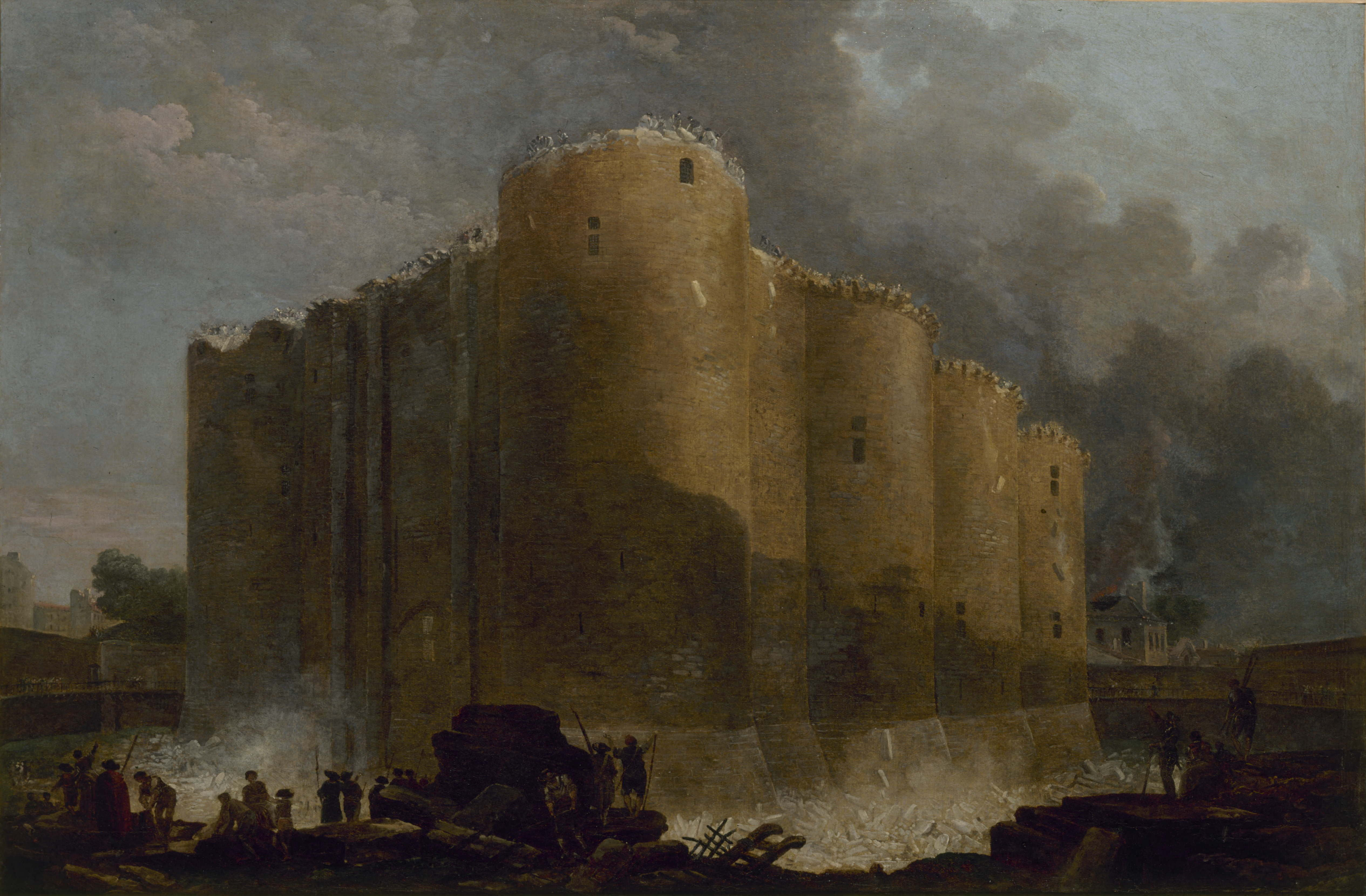
- Artist: Hubert Robert
- Year: 1789
- Type: Oil on canvas, history painting
- Dimensions: 77 cm × 114 cm (30 in × 45 in)
- Location: Musée Carnavalet, Paris

The Bastille During the First Days of its Demolition (French: La Bastille, dans les premiers jours de sa démolition) is a 1789 history painting by the French artist Hubert Robert. Following the Storming of the Bastille on 14 July 1789 at the beginning of the French Revolution, it was announced that the historic fortress and prison would be dismantled. Robert portrays the Bastille in the early stages of demolition.

It was exhibited at the Salon of 1789 at the Louvre in Paris. Today it is in the city's Musée Carnavalet, having been acquired in 1929.

== Bibliography ==
- Adams, William Howard. The Paris Years of Thomas Jefferson. Yale University Press, 1997.
- Chu, Petra ten-Doesschate. Nineteenth-Century European Art. Prentice Hall, 2006.
- Dubin, Nina L. Futures & Ruins: Eighteenth-century Paris and the Art of Hubert Robert. Getty Publications, 2010.
- Gamboni, Dario. The Destruction of Art: Iconoclasm and Vandalism since the French Revolution. Reaktion Books, 2013.
