= Portrait of William Linley =

1788 painting by Thomas Lawrence

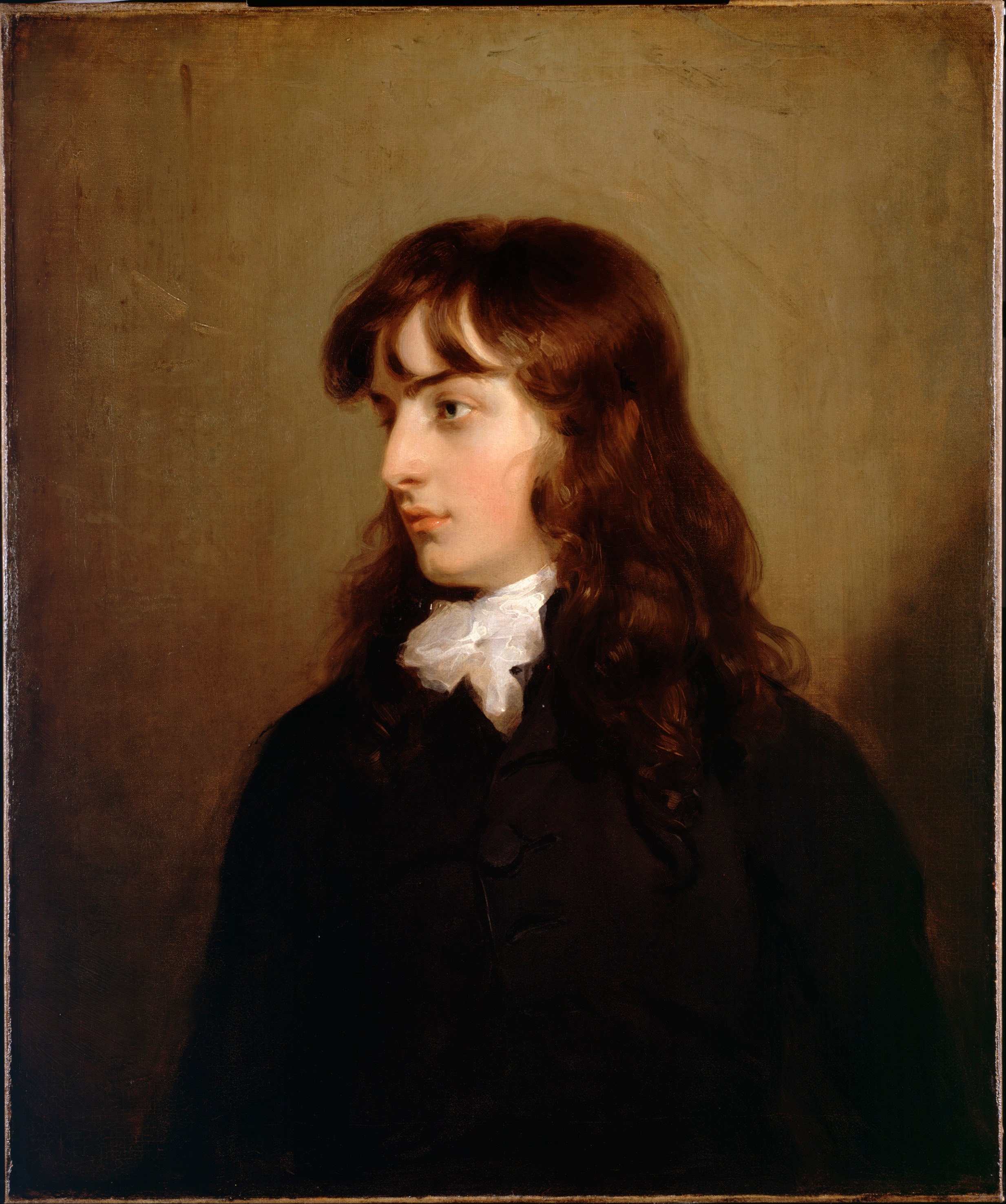
- Artist: Thomas Lawrence
- Year: 1788
- Type: Oil on canvas, portrait
- Dimensions: 76.2 cm × 63.5 cm (30.0 in × 25.0 in)
- Location: Dulwich Picture Gallery, London

Portrait of William Linley is an oil on canvas portrait painting by the British artist Thomas Lawrence, from 1788. It depicts William Linley.

== History and description ==
Lawrence was a young Bath-based society portraitist, just as his career was about to take off. The Linley Family of Bath were well-known musical performers, connected with the theatre. Lawrence was a friend of William Linley who was a year younger than him. The painting may have served as an audition for his bid for a royal commission. George III reputedly joked that Linley needed a haircut. Nonetheless, Lawrence was soon afterwards commissioned to paint the King's wife Queen Charlotte. That painting's success at the Royal Academy's Summer Exhibition led to Lawrence's establishment as a leading society portraitist. Today it is part of the collection at Dulwich Art Gallery in South London. It was given as part of a bequest by the painting's subject along with other works featuring his family.

== Bibliography ==
- Holmes, Richard. Thomas Lawrence Portraits. National Portrait Gallery, 2010.
- Levey, Michael. Sir Thomas Lawrence. Yale University Press, 2005.
- Roberts, Jane. George III and Queen Charlotte: Patronage, Collecting and Court Taste. Royal Collection, 2004.
- Stourton, James. Great Smaller Museums of Europe. Scala, 2003.
