= Blind Man's Bluff (Goya) =

Painting by Francisco de Goya

- La gallina ciega (Spanish)
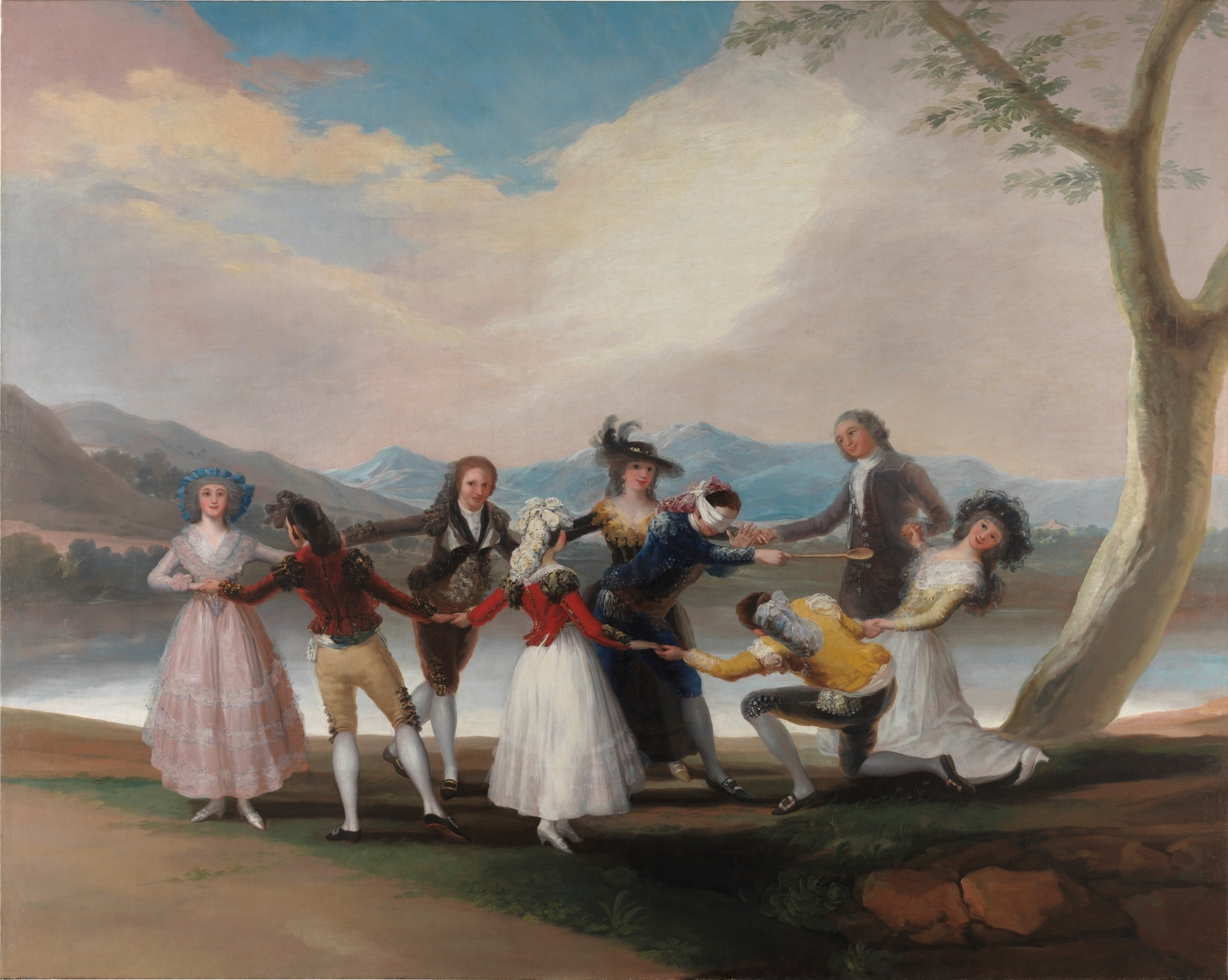
- Artist: Francisco Goya
- Year: 1789
- Medium: Oil on Canvas
- Dimensions: 269 cm × 350 cm (106 in × 140 in)
- Location: Museo del Prado, Madrid

Blind Man's Bluff (Spanish: La gallina ciega) is one of the Rococo oil-on-linen cartoons produced by the Spanish artist Francisco de Goya for tapestries for the Royal Palace of El Pardo. The painting and the previous sketch are held in the Museo del Prado, in Madrid.

== Description ==
The work shows boys and girls playing the popular pastime "blind man's bluff", with one figure in the middle blindfolded and holding a large spoon while trying to entice others dancing around him in a circle.

The youngsters are dressed as majos and majas, the attire of the humble classes of Spanish society that the aristocrats, like those in this painting, liked to wear. Some of them wear velvet jackets and feathered headdresses, following the fashion of the upper classes from France.

The composition is resolved by alternating the characters between the gaps left by those in the foreground and background, and contrasting the young man who crouches to the right to avoid the ladle and the woman leaning back with another young man leaning forward.

The painting is an example of the Rococo style, with characteristic stylistic features: vivacity, immediacy, curiosity, chromaticism of soft roses, gauze textures in the women's skirts, a luminous landscape background, the depiction of a flirtatious moment.

== See also ==
- Francisco Goya's tapestry cartoons
- List of Francisco Goya's tapestry cartoons
- List of works by Francisco Goya

== Sources ==
- Bozal, Valeriano. Francisco Goya, vida y obra., Madrid, Tf, 2005. 64. ISBN 978-84-96209-39-8.
