= The Braddyll Family =

Painting by Joshua Reynolds

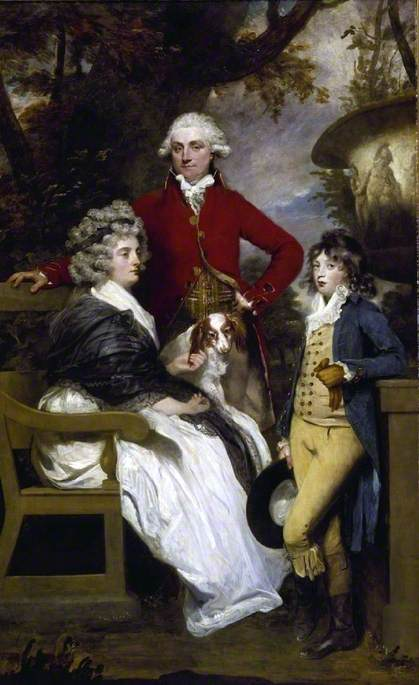
- Artist: Joshua Reynolds
- Year: 1789
- Type: Oil on canvas, portrait painting
- Dimensions: 238.1 cm × 147.3 cm (93.7 in × 58.0 in)
- Location: Fitzwilliam Museum; Cambridge

The Braddyll Family is a 1789 portrait painting by the British artist Joshua Reynolds It is a group portrait featuring the landowner and politician Wilson Gale-Braddyll his wife Jane and son Thomas.

Critics have noted that it was produced the same year that the French Revolution broke out across the English Channel yet demonstrates the self-confidence of the British elite. Reynolds was the President of the Royal Academy at the time and Britain's leading portraitist of the period. It was amongst the final major works produced by Reynolds before his health declined. Today the painting is in the collection of the Fitzwilliam Museum in Cambridge, having been acquired in 1995.

== Bibliography ==
- Clark, Gregory. A Farewell to Alms: A Brief Economic History of the World. Princeton University Press, 2008.
- McIntyre, Ian. Joshua Reynolds: The Life and Times of the First President of the Royal Academy. Allen Lane, 2003.
