= The Lictors Bring to Brutus the Bodies of His Sons =

Painting by Jacques-Louis David

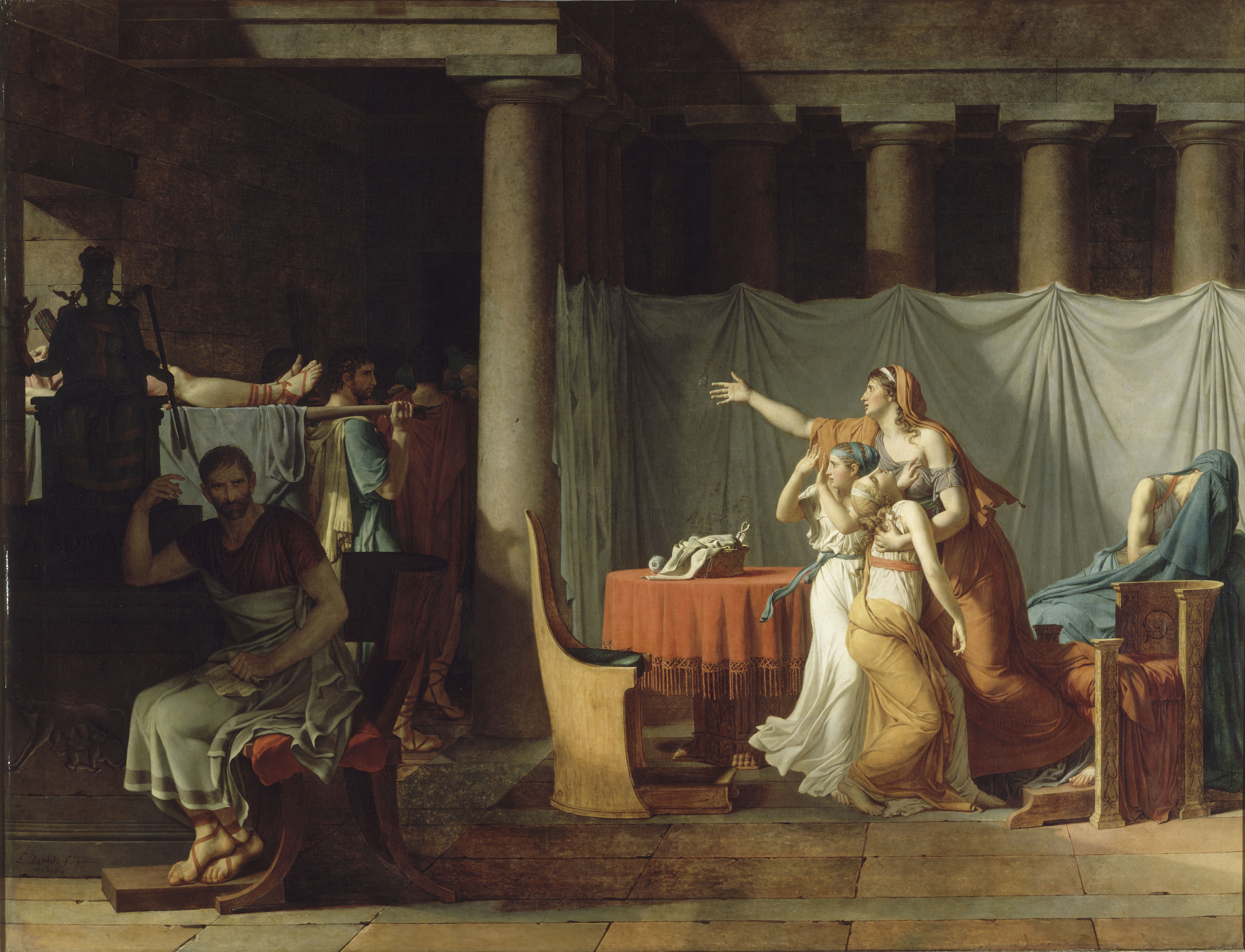
- Artist: Jacques-Louis David
- Year: 1789
- Medium: oil on canvas
- Dimensions: 323 cm × 422 cm (127 in × 166 in)
- Location: Louvre, Paris

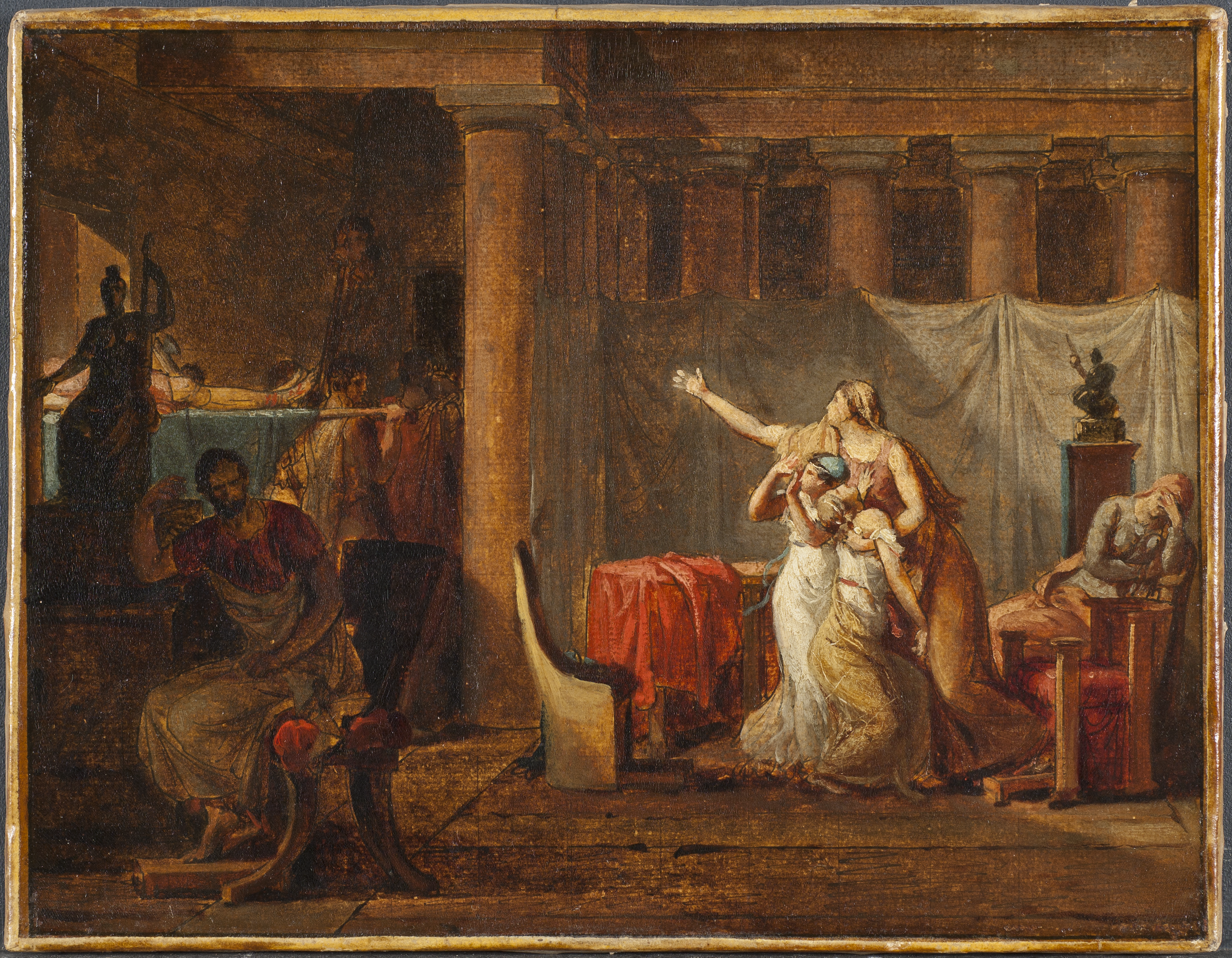
The study in Nationalmuseum

The Lictors Bring to Brutus the Bodies of His Sons (French: Les licteurs rapportent à Brutus les corps de ses fils) is a work in oils by the French artist Jacques-Louis David. On a canvas of 146 square feet, this painting was first exhibited at the Paris Salon in 1789. The subject is the Roman leader Lucius Junius Brutus, founder of the Roman Republic, contemplating the fate of his sons. They had conspired to overthrow the republic and restore the monarchy, and Brutus himself was compelled to order their deaths. In doing so, Brutus became the heroic defender of the republic, at the cost of his own family. The painting was a bold allegory of civic virtue with immense resonance for the growing cause of republicanism. Its themes of virtue, sacrifice, and devotion to the nation sparked much controversy when it was unveiled in the politically charged era of the French Revolution.

== Background ==
David labored over the painting for more than two years before he considered it complete. His attachment to the motif of Brutus had been evident for years before this painting, at least since the early 1780s when he was making The Oath of the Horatii (1784). This earlier work bears a distinct connection to Brutus through the themes of duty, loyalty, and virtue. The oath itself was an element of the Brutus legend which David artistically transposed to the Horatii. Similar license was taken with the composition of Brutus: the return of the sons' bodies is an episode not found in the accounts of Livy and Plutarch.

David's enthusiasm for the republican cause, at least at this early stage, is a matter of dispute. Many historians believe his painterly inspirations were more prosaic, drawn from standard classical history lessons and lesser events of contemporary notoriety. In spite of its quick apotheosis by the public, some contemporaries questioned the personal intentions of David regarding this work, and the debate remains unresolved.

== Composition ==
Like most of David's major works, Brutus is on a large canvas. It measures 323 centimetres (127 in) in height and 422 centimetres (166 in) in width. The style of painting is in the Neoclassical manner. Brutus sits on a klismos on the left, alone and brooding; to the right, his wife holds their two horrified daughters, the elder of which is about to faint, while a servant on the far right quakes in anguish.

Note Brutus' tense crossed feet in the picture, the sharp scissors that lay dead in the center of the painting, and the use of light and dark to draw a distinction between Brutus and his wife. Brutus does not even look back as his headless sons Tiberius and Titus are brought into the room.

== Presentation ==
The name is frequently rendered in English as Brutus Receiving the Bodies of His Sons, among other variations, including Brutus and His Dead Sons and simply Brutus. The complete original name as presented to the Salon was much lengthier and more explicative. It too has been rendered in various forms, but as translated from the small Salon guidebook (livret) offered in 1789, it reads, with poignancy in the first year of the Revolution, as: Brutus, first consul, returned to his house after having condemned his two sons who had allied themselves with the Tarquins and conspired against Roman liberty; the lictors return their bodies so that they may be entombed.

== Impact ==
The work had tremendous resonance for the time. The Revolution had already begun, and all paintings shown at the Salon had to be approved for political acceptability. David's 1788 portrait of Antoine Lavoisier had already been refused a display because the famed chemist was a potentially divisive figure, tied as he was to the Ancien Régime. Out of similar caution, The Lictors Bring to Brutus the Bodies of His Sons was almost not shown because of concerns about inflaming pro-revolutionary passions. The public's insistence was too great, however, and the authorities were forced to give in.

After its first exhibition, David's friend, the actor François-Joseph Talma, played the title role in Voltaire's Brutus and added in a scene in which the stage direction exactly replicated the composition of the already famous painting.

== Legacy ==
The Lictors Bring to Brutus the Bodies of His Sons is on permanent display in the Louvre in Paris. A study in ink and chalk from 1787 is housed in the Metropolitan Museum of Art in New York City. An oil-on-canvas study is in the collections of Nationalmuseum in Stockholm.

The painting is featured in the 1980 BBC series 100 Great Paintings.

== See also ==
- List of paintings by Jacques-Louis David
- Lictor
