= Jules Robert Auguste =

French painter

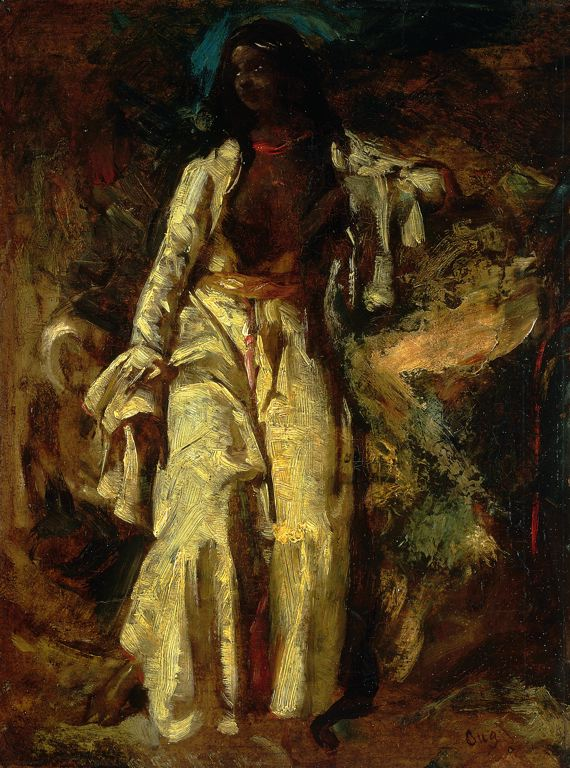
Nubian Woman, 1825/30

Jules Robert Auguste (1789 – 15 April 1850) was a French painter associated with Romanticism and classicism. Initially a sculptor, he won accolades, including the 1810 Prix de Rome.

He was also well known as a traveller, and his tales – and souvenirs – from places such as Greece, Syria, Turkey, Albania, Egypt, and various regions of the Middle East provided fuel for French Orientalism. He also painted detailed depictions of Arab and black people. Auguste was the only French Romantic artist to visit the Near East while Louis XVIII was in power.
