= Joseph Recognised by His Brothers =

Painting by Anne-Louis Girodet de Roussy-Trioson

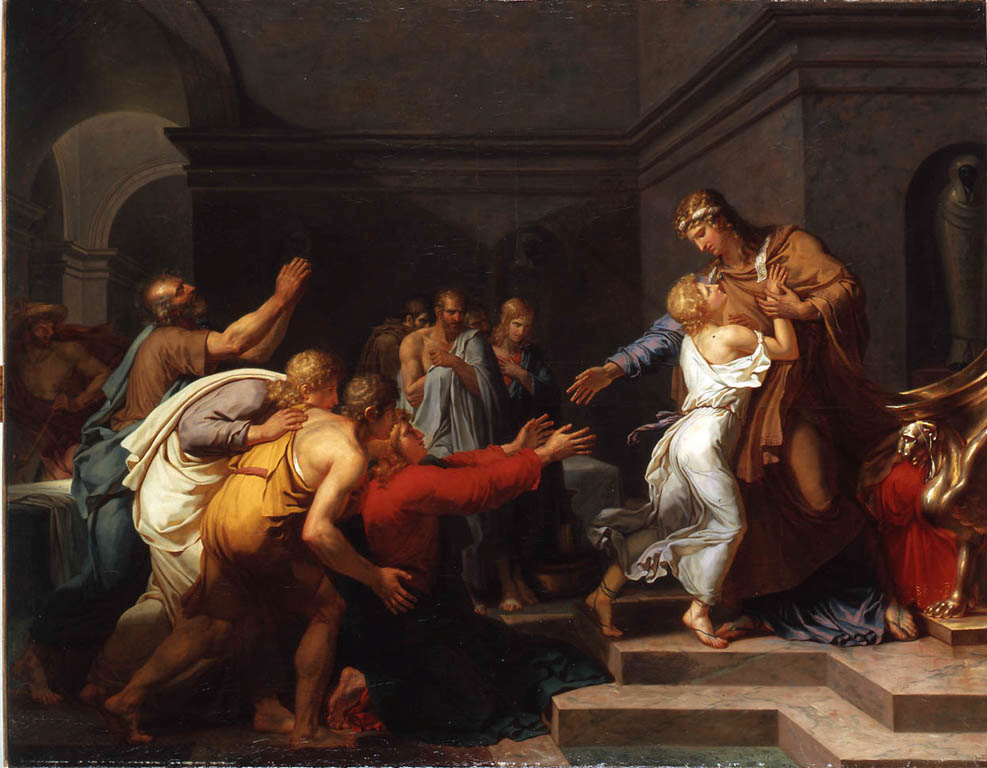
- Artist: Anne-Louis Girodet de Roussy-Trioson
- Year: 1789
- Type: Oil on canvas, history painting
- Dimensions: 120 cm × 155 cm (47 in × 61 in)
- Location: École des Beaux-Arts; Paris

Joseph Recognised by His Brothers (French: Joseph reconnu par ses frères) is a 1789 history painting by the French artist Anne-Louis Girodet de Roussy-Trioson. It portrays the biblical story of Joseph who is recognised in Ancient Egypt by the brothers who had once sold him into slavery. Neoclassical in style, it helped establish his reputation as a painter, The painting won the artist the Prix de Rome, allowing him to study in Italy for several years. Today it is in the collection of the École des Beaux-Arts in Paris.

== Bibliography ==
- Crow, Thomas. Emulation: David, Drouais, and Girodet in the Art of Revolutionary France. Yale University Press, 2006.
- Levenson, Alan T. Joseph: Portraits Through the Ages. University of Nebraska Press, 2016
- Levitine, George. Girodet-Trioson: An Iconographical Study. Garland, 1978.
- Murray, Christopher John. Encyclopedia of the Romantic Era, 1760-1850, Volume 2. Taylor & Francis, 2004.
- Palmer, Allison Lee. Historical Dictionary of Romantic Art and Architecture. Rowman & Littlefield, 2019.
