= Cupid and Psyche (Reynolds) =

Painting by Joshua Reynolds

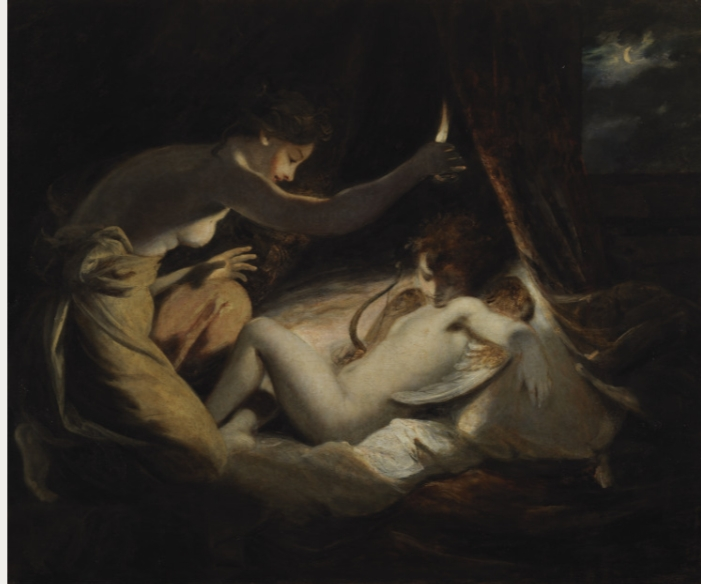
- Artist: Joshua Reynolds
- Year: 1789
- Type: Oil on canvas, history painting
- Dimensions: 139.8 cm × 168.3 cm (55.0 in × 66.3 in)
- Location: Courtauld Gallery; London

Cupid and Psyche is a 1789 history painting by the British artist Joshua Reynolds. It depicts a scene from the story of Cupid and Psyche in Ancient Greek Mythology. Based on the work Metamorphoses by the Roman historian Apuleius it depicts the moment when the mortal Psyche discovers that her mysterious lover is Cupid, the son of the goddess Venus. The subject was a popular one in European art. Unusually Reynolds focuses attention on Cupid rather than the physical beauty of Psyche, and portrays him as a skinny boy.

Reynolds had been President of the Royal Academy for twenty years and the leading British portrait painter of the late eighteenth century. The work was displayed at the Royal Academy's Summer Exhibition of 1789 at Somerset House. Today the painting is in the collection of the Courtauld Gallery in London, having been allocated there by the British government after being accepted in lieu.

== Bibliography ==
- Bryson, Norman, Holly, Michael Ann & Moxey, Keith. Visual Culture: Images and Interpretations. Wesleyan University Press, 1994.
- Rauser, Amelia. The Age of Undress: Art, Fashion, and the Classical Ideal in the 1790s. Yale University Press, 2020.
