= Estelle de Barescut =

French painter and lithographer

- Born: Estelle-Félicité-Marie de Barescut c. 1815; Paris or Versailles
- Died: c. 1852

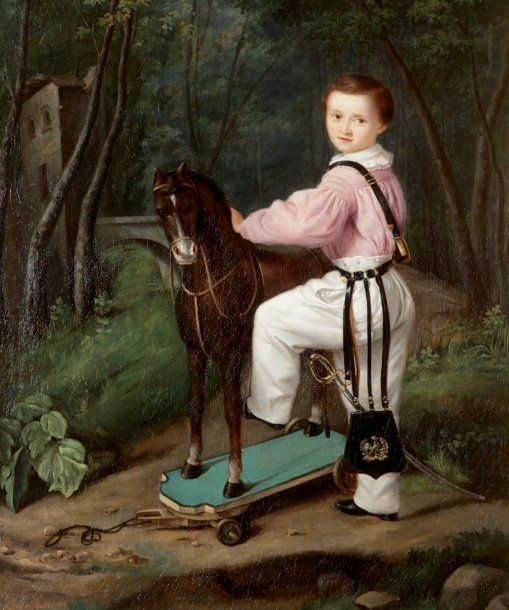
Portrait d'enfant au cheval de bois, 1843, oil on canvas

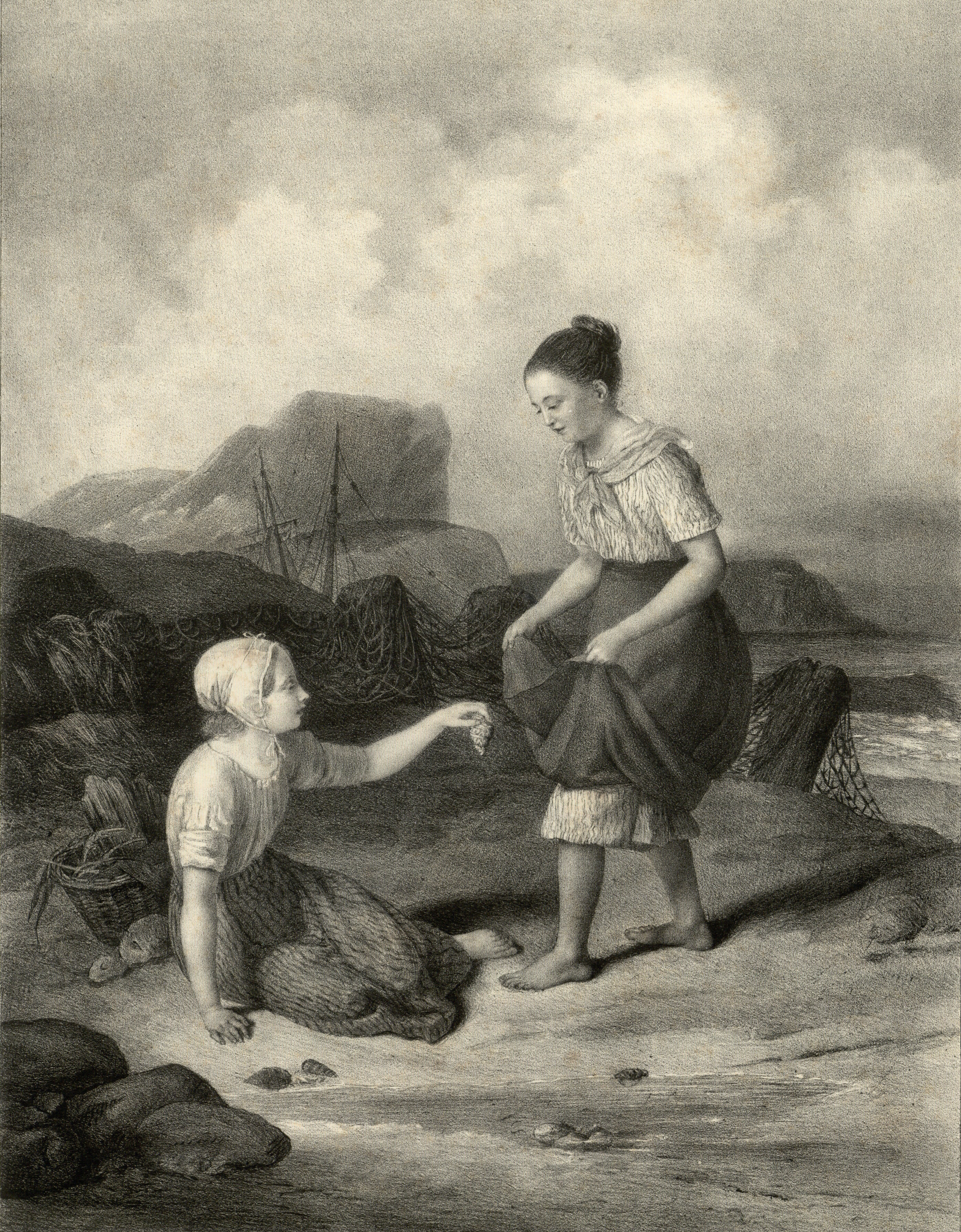
Les Petites Pêcheuses de Dunkerque, 1833, lithographie d'après Jean-Augustin Franquelin

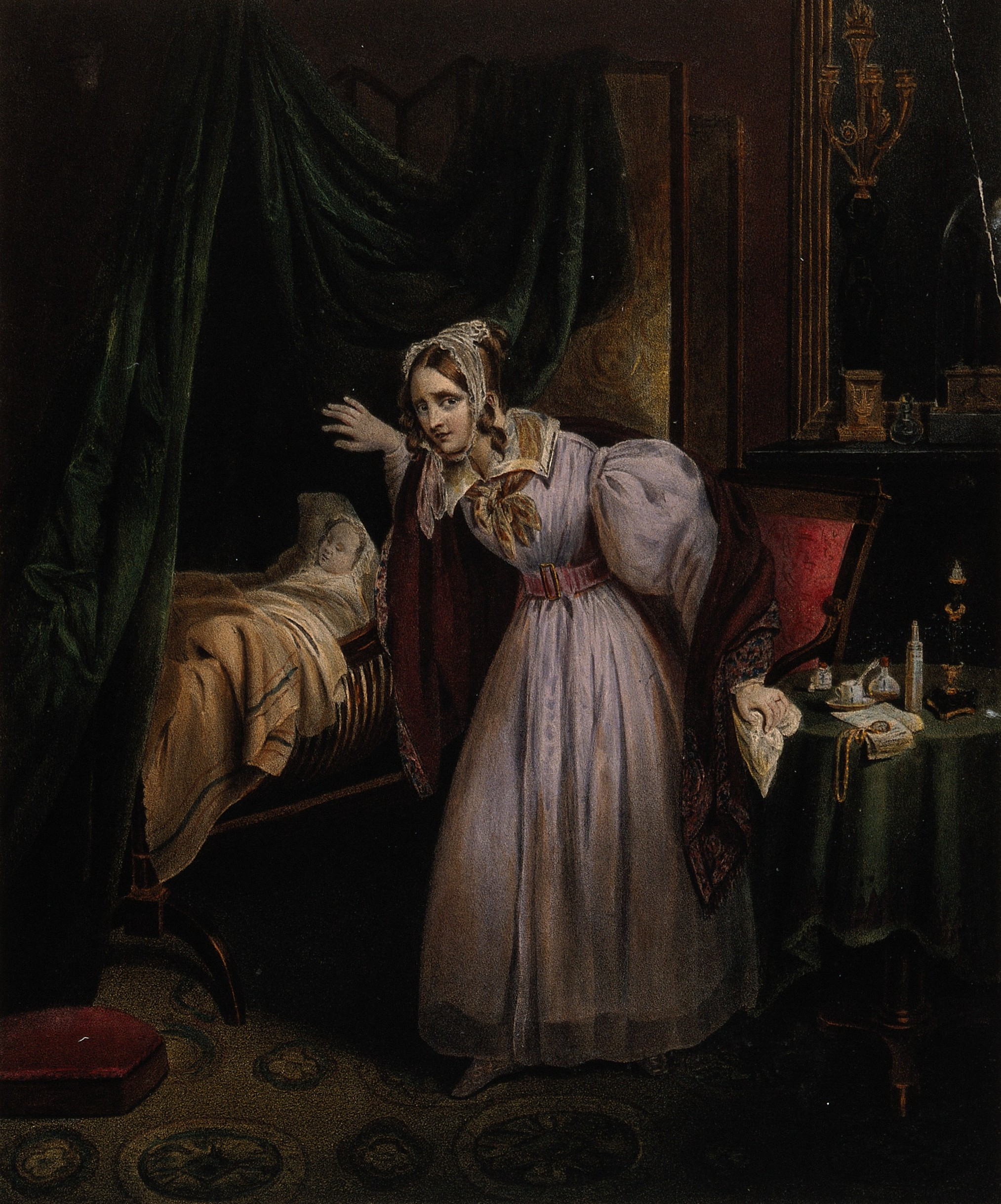
L'Anxiété maternelle, Salon of 1834, lithographie couleur d'après Aimable Le Bot

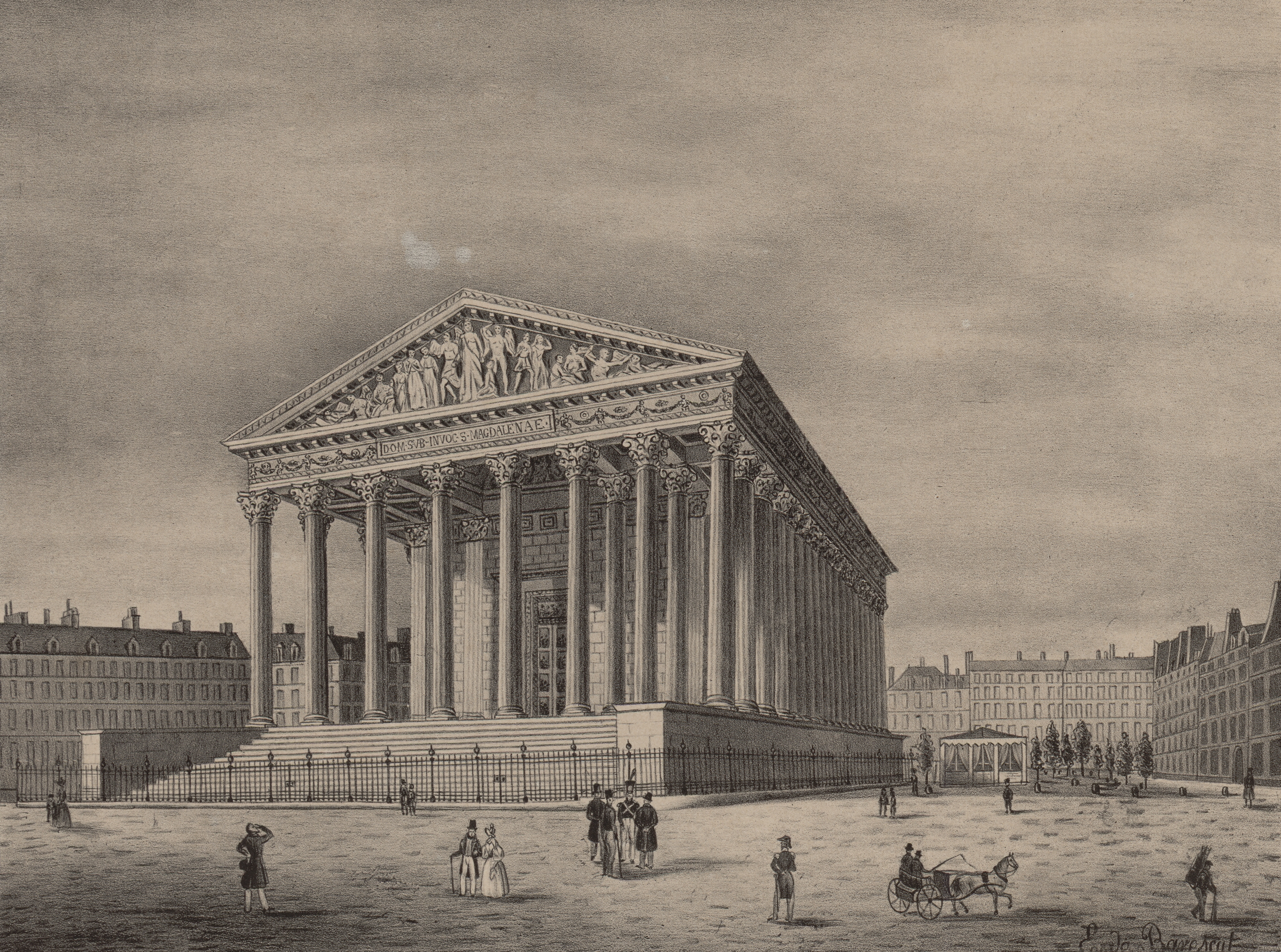
Église de la Madeleine, 1834, lithographie d'après Wnartz

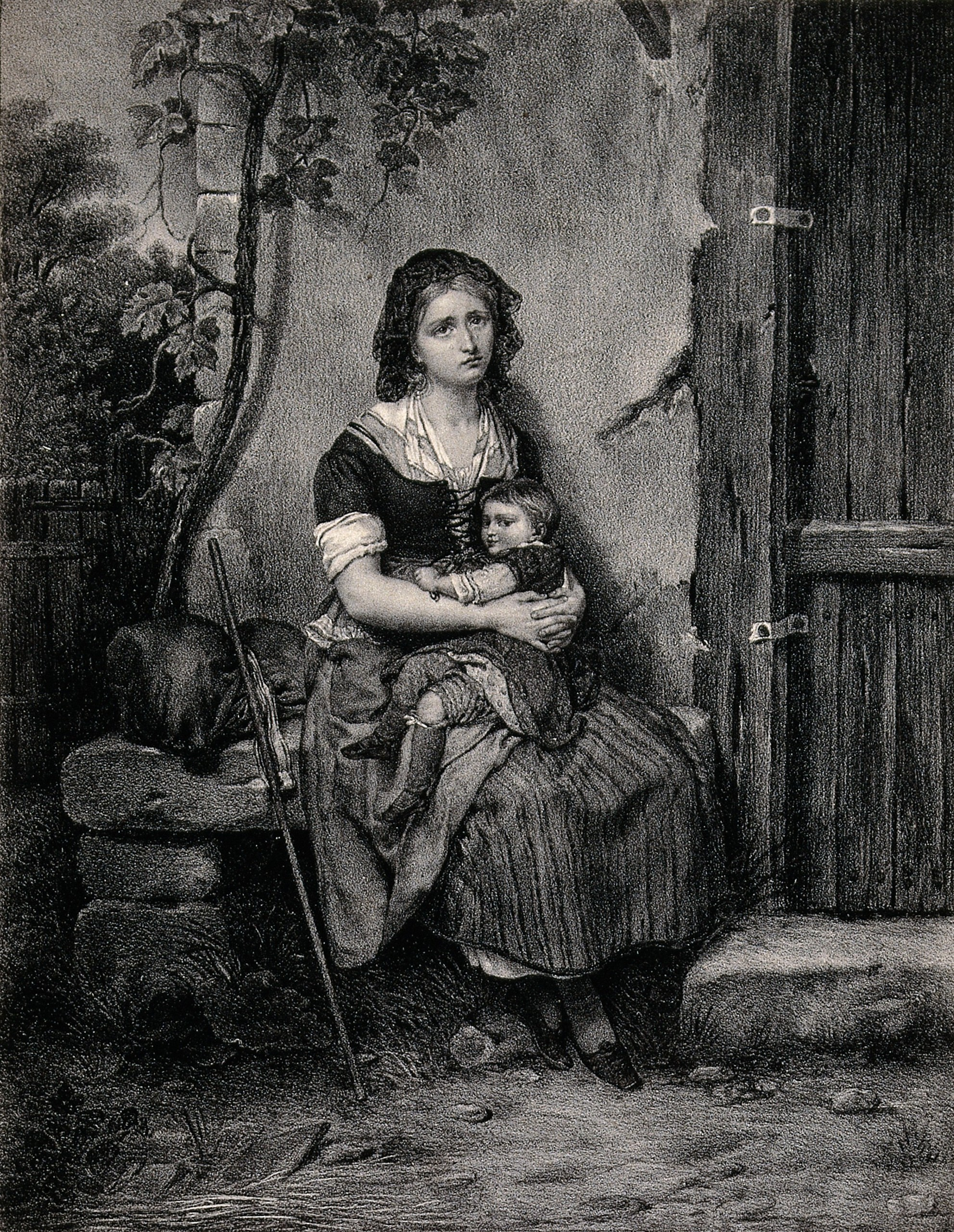
La Veuve et le scellé, Salon of 1835, lithograph after Jean-Augustin Franquelin

Estelle de Barescut (c. 1815 – c. 1852) was a French painter and lithographer. She exhibited her lithographs at the Salon de Paris in 1834 and 1835, and her paintings from 1842 to 1851.

== Biography ==
She was born Estelle-Félicité-Marie de Barescut (or de Barescut de Vernet). Sources differ on her place of birth, with some citing Versailles and others saying Paris.

She was a student of the École royale et gratuite de dessin pour les jeunes personnes de Paris in the 1820s, where in October 1829 she won a 2nd prize in drawing. She was later a student of Horace Vernet.

== Works ==
=== Painting ===
==== Exhibited at the Salons ====
- Portraits en pied des filles de Mme..., Salon of 1842
- Portrait de Mlle..., Salon of 1842
- Portrait de de Mme d'..., Salon of 1843
- Tête de jeune fille, étude, Salon of 1843 (No. 36)
- Une jeune châtelaine; costume du moyen-âge, Salon of 1844 (No. 66)
- Portraits des enfants de M. Davaux-Poirier, Salon of 1846 (No. 78)
- Une lecture chez Anne d'Autriche, after Les Trois Mousquetaires of Alexandre Dumas, Salon of 1848 (No. 194)
- Petite paysanne à la maraude, étude, Salon of 1848 (No. 195)
- La Promenade, Salon of 1848 (No. 196)
- La Fille du braconnier, Salon of 1848 (No. 197)
- Tête de jeune fille, pastel, Salon of 1848 (No. 198)
- Portrait en pied de Mme Lacomb, née Louise Courvoisier Salon of 1850

==== Others ====
- Portrait de femme, undated, oil on canvas, Autun, musée Rolin, 985.12.2
- Portrait d'homme, undated, oil on canvas, musée Rolin, 985.12.3
- Sujet militaire, after Horace Vernet, undated, watercolour, former collection of François Depeaux

=== Lithography ===
- Famille d'Ischia (Ile du Royaume de Naples), after Alexandre-Marie Colin, before 1830
- Les Petites Pêcheuses de Dunkerque, 1833
- La Couronne de bluets (or bleuets), 1833, after Philippon, lithograph printed by Delaunois for Chaillou
- L'Anxiété maternelle, Salon of 1834, After the work of the same name by Aimable Le Bot presented at the 1833 Salon, lithograph printed by Gihaut frères
- Album de six sujets peints par Mme Collin et Franquelin, 1834, lithographed album printed by Delaunois for Morlot; after Franquelin : Une Châtelaine infidèle, Une Scène de famille et La Catalanne [sic] à la fontaine; d'après Mme Collin : La Marchande alsacienne, Une scène de bal masqué and La leçon de chant. La Catalane à la fontaine and La Marchande alsacienne were presented at the 1834 Salon
- Six vues de Paris, lithographic album, Desesserts, 1834 : Notre Dame, Colonnade du Louvre, Château des Tuileries, St Germain L'Auxerrois, Hôtel de ville, Bourse et tribunal de commerce
- Eglise de la Madeleine, after Wnartz, printed by Delaunois for Desesserts, 1834
- Portrait d'enfant, Delannois, 1834
- La Veuve et le scellé, Salon of 1835;

== Collections ==
Her work is included in the Wellcome Collection, the Musée Carnavalet, Paris and the Musée Rolin.
