= Simon Saint-Jean =

French painter

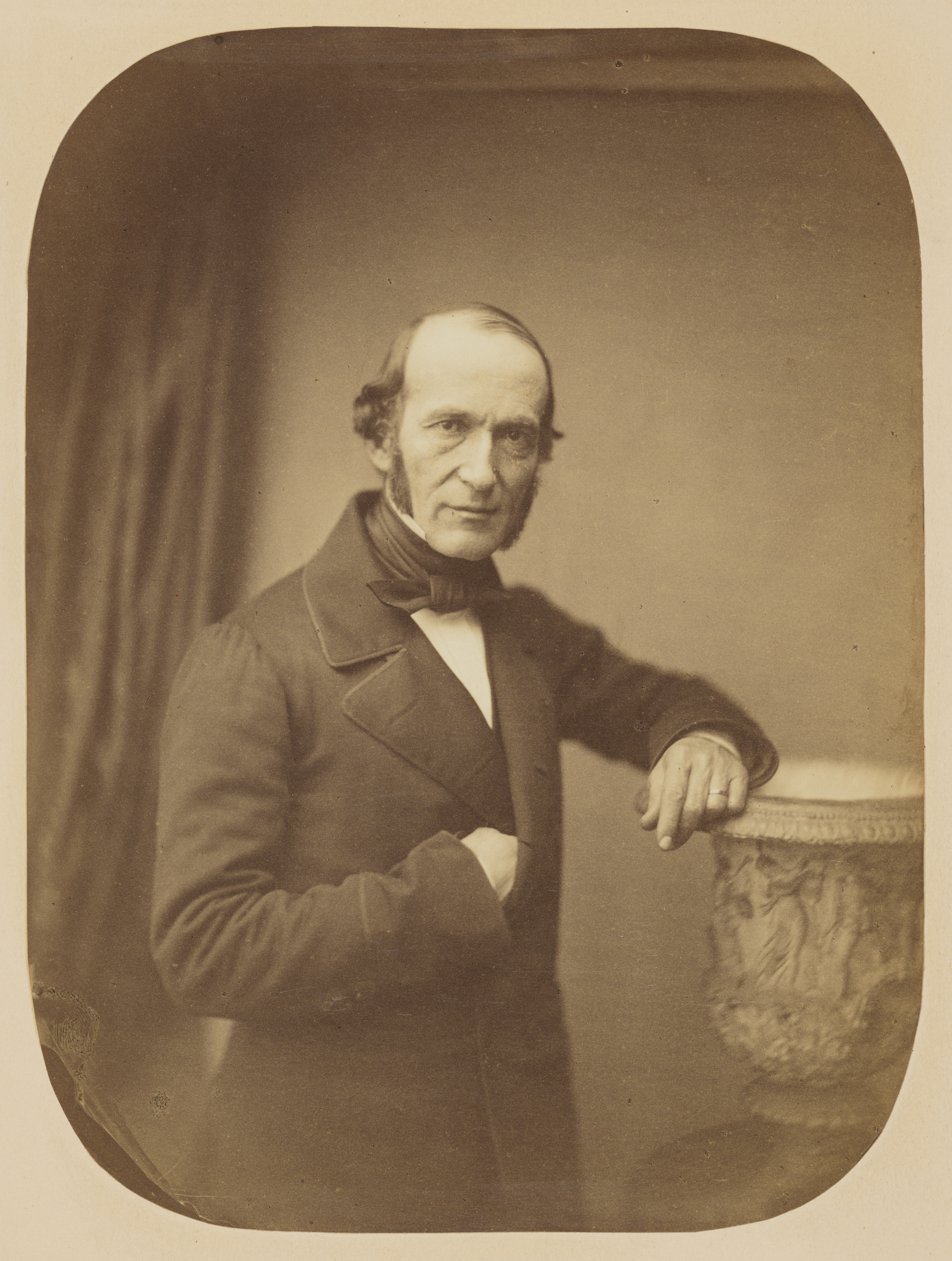
Simon Saint-Jean (date unknown)

Simon Saint-Jean (14 October 1808, Lyon - 3 July 1860, Écully) was a French painter who specialized in flowers.

== Biography ==
His father, Jean-Marguerite Saint-Jean (1780-1815), was a cooper, who died when Simon was only seven years old. In 1822, he entered the École de beaux-arts de Lyon where he studied drawing with Pierre Révoil and Augustin Alexandre Thierriat. He won several contests for flower painting and was awarded a gold medal in 1826. After finishing school, he found a position in the silk design workshop of François Lepage. In 1834, he had his first showing at the Salon and was awarded a second-class medal.

In 1837, he married Camille Belmont, daughter of Jean-Nicolas Belmont, a wealthy silk manufacturer.

At the Salon of 1842, he was criticized by Théophile Gautier for a painting of Christ's head surrounded by eucharistic symbols. The following year he presented a "Christ with Grapes" that attracted the attention of Baron Scipion Corvisart, the adopted son of Jean-Nicolas Corvisart, who proceeded to promote Saint-Jean's career by introducing his works in the Belgian and Dutch markets. In England, they were acquired by the Marquess of Hertford. In France, they were purchased by the Duc de Morny.

The year 1843 was also the year that he was named a Chevalier in the Legion of Honor.

In 1845, Charles Baudelaire saw his exhibit at the Salon and was highly critical, referring to his works as "dining room paintings". The following year, Baudelaire criticized him again, for using too much yellow. He presented six paintings at the Great Exhibition of 1851 in London.

His wife died in 1855, plunging him into a deep depression, which remained despite his successes that year. These included being named a Chevalier in the Order of Leopold, which came with being named a member of the Royal Academy of Science, Letters and Fine Arts of Belgium, followed by a Salon showing in which he received the second-class medal but, by a decision of the Minister of State, Achille Fould, was given a first-class medal instead.

== Gallery ==
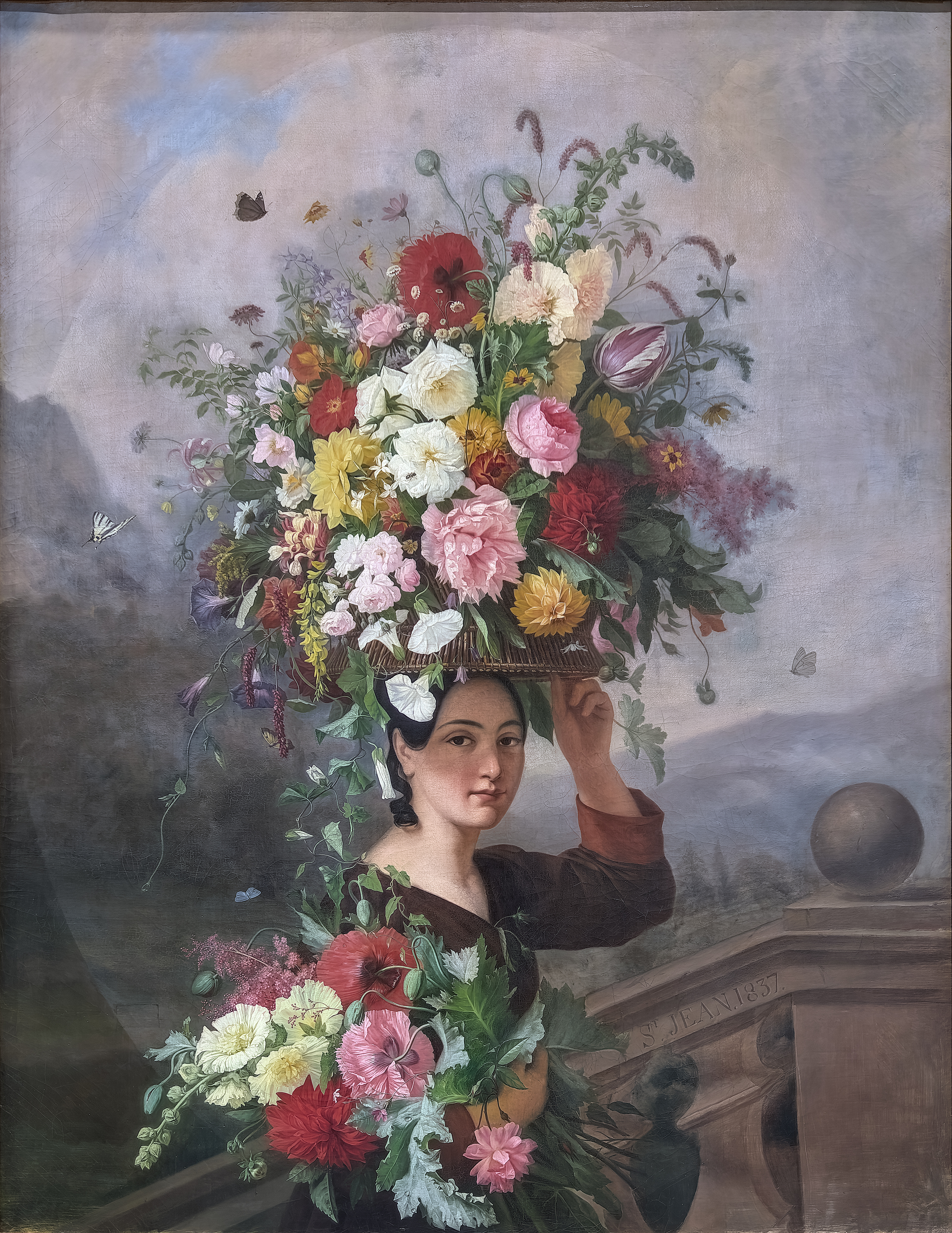
Young Girl Holding Flowers, 1837

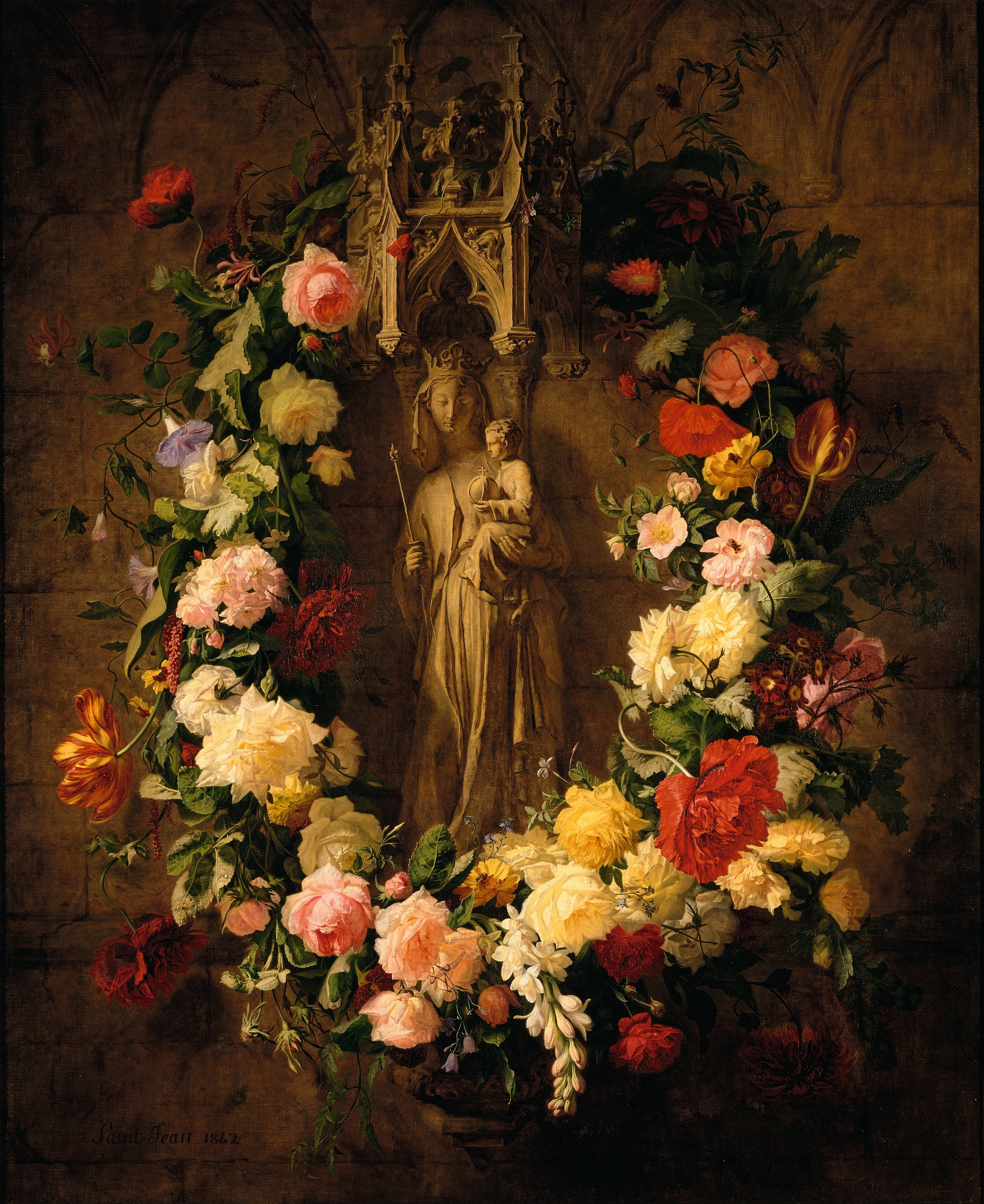
Offering to the Virgin, 1842

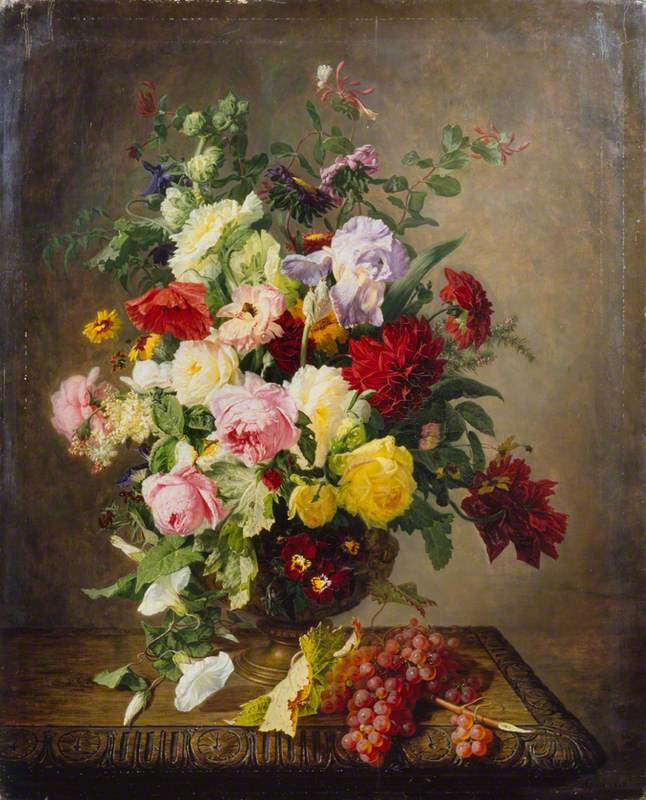
Flowers and Fruit, 1848

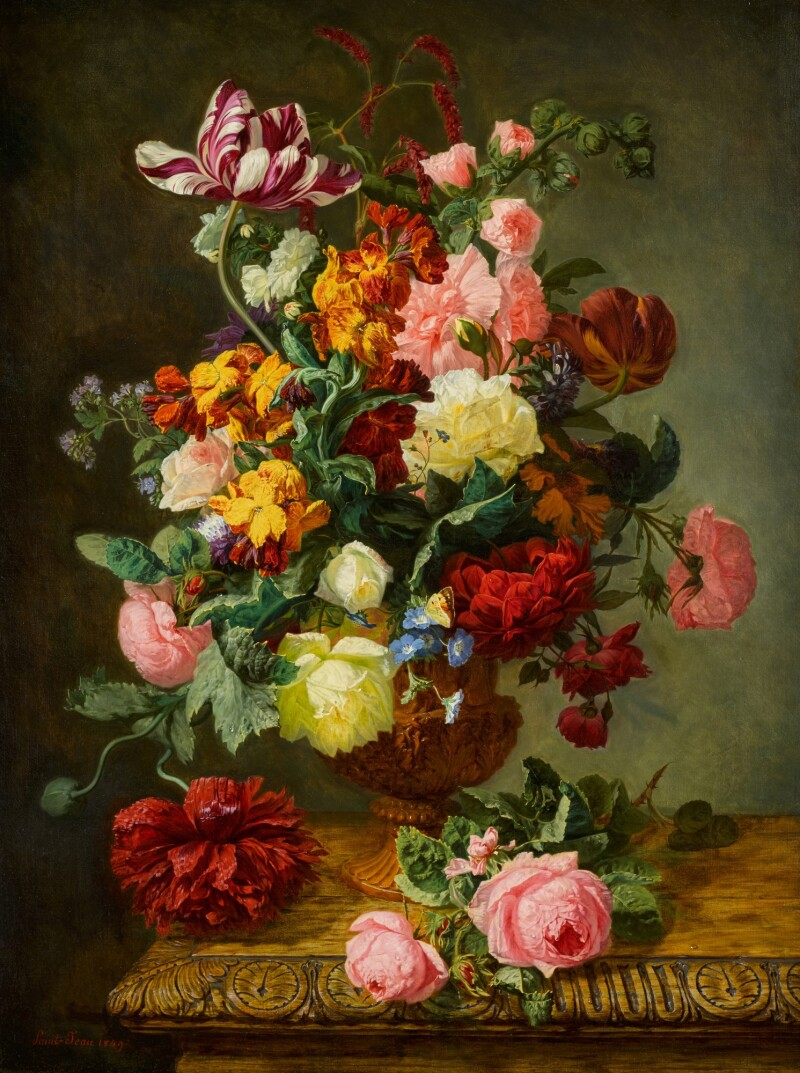
The Bouquet, 1849

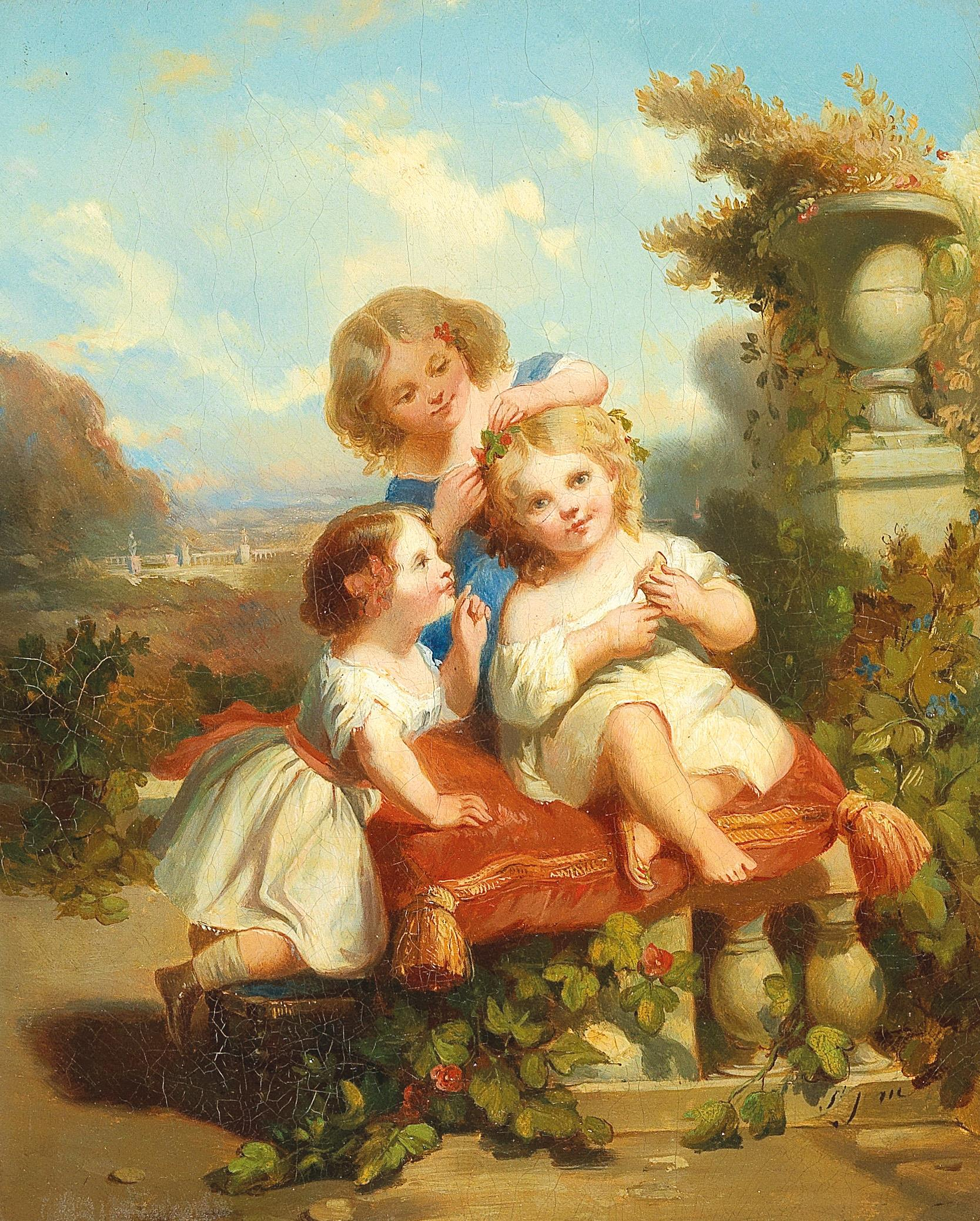
The New Bow, 1860
