= The Return of Napoleon =

Painting by Eugène Isabey

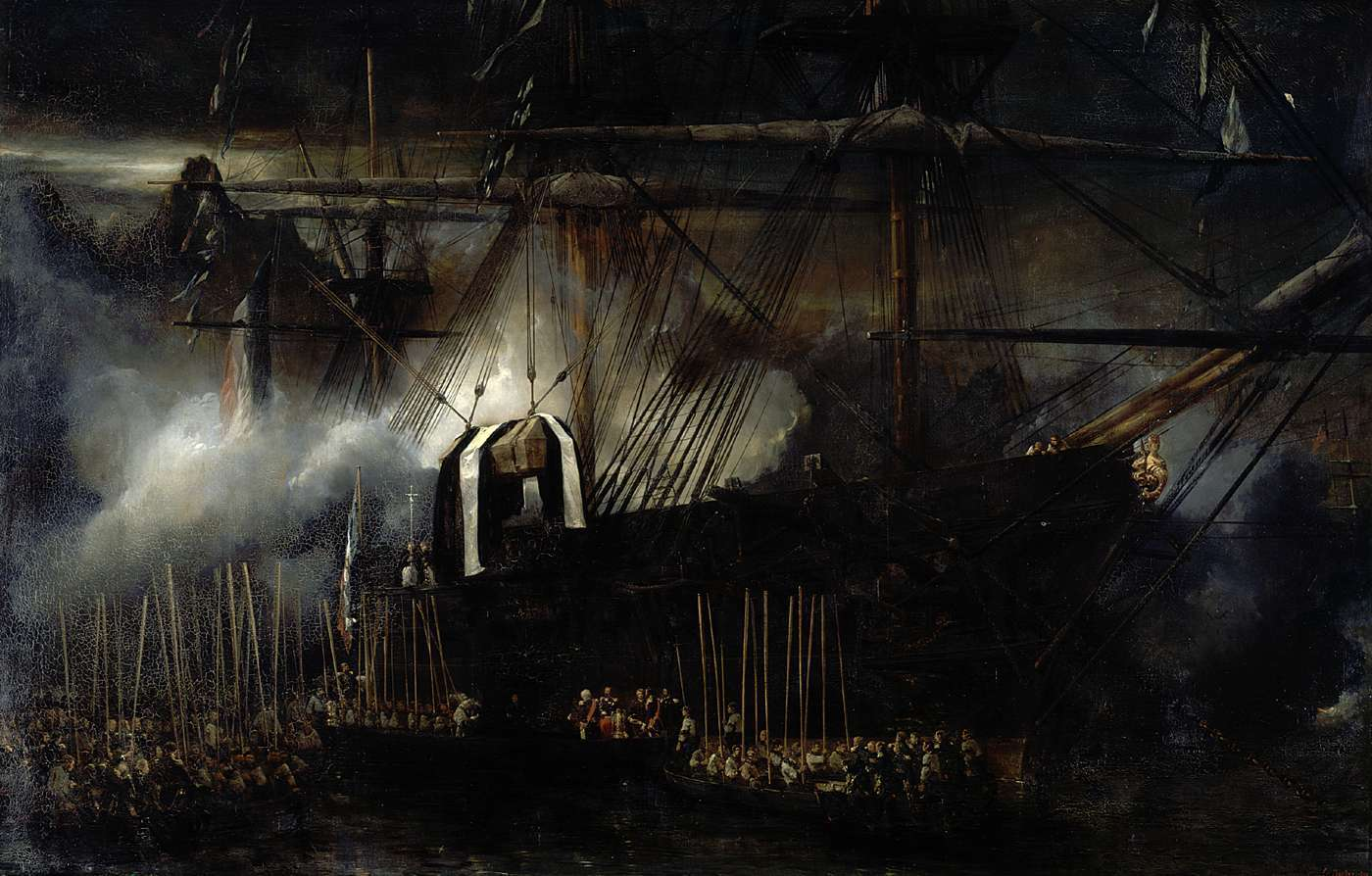
- Artist: Eugène Isabey
- Year: 1842
- Type: Oil on canvas, landscape painting
- Dimensions: 237.5 cm × 369.5 cm (93.5 in × 145.5 in)
- Location: Palace of Versailles, Versailles

The Return of Napoleon (French:Transbordement des restes de Napoléon) is an 1842 history painting by the French artist Eugène Isabey. It depicts the night transfer of the body of Napoleon to the French Navy frigate French frigate Belle Poule. It took place on 15 October 1840 off the Atlantic island of Saint Helena, where he had died in 1821 in the custody of the British Army.

It formed part of the ceremonial return of Napoleon to France, where he had ruled as Emperor from 1804 to 1815. Isabey was a part of the Romantic movement. The painting was displayed at the Salon of 1842 at the Louvre in Paris. Today it is in the collection of the Museum of French History at the Palace of Versailles.

== Bibliography ==
- Leribault, Christophe. Eugène Isabey. Louvre, 2012.
- Miquel, Pierre. Eugène Isabey, 1803-1886. Martinelle, 1980.
- Rapelli, Paola. Symbols of Power in Art. Getty Publications, 2011.
