= The Town and Port of Dieppe =

Painting by Eugène Isabey

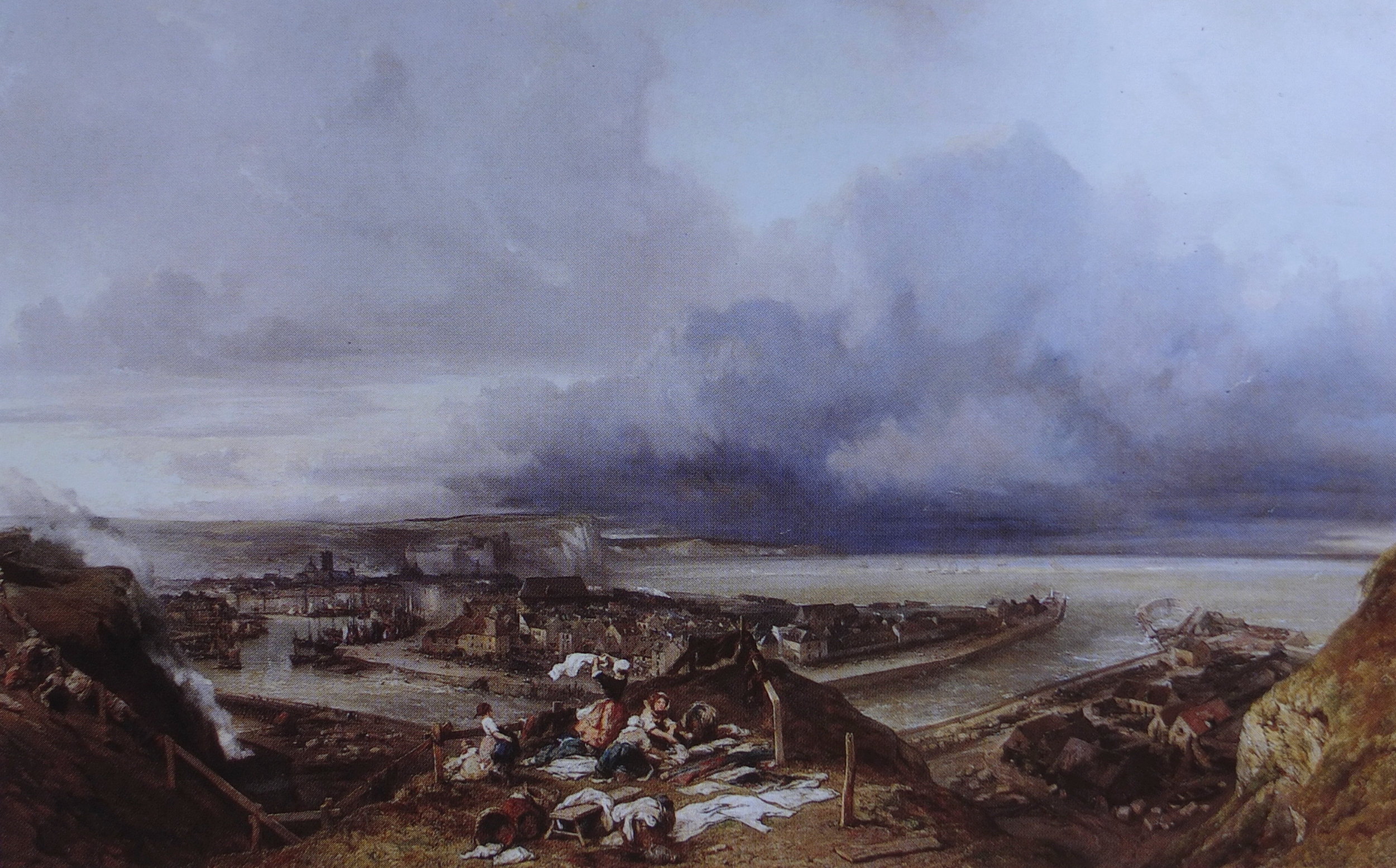
- Artist: Eugène Isabey
- Year: 1842
- Type: Oil on canvas, landscape painting
- Dimensions: 164 cm × 251 cm (65 in × 99 in)
- Location: Museum of Fine Arts, Nancy

The Town and Port of Dieppe (French: Vue de la ville et du port de Dieppe) is an 1842 landscape painting by the French artist Eugène Isabey. it depicts the town and port of Dieppe in Normandy in the Romantic style at its height during the period.

Isabey was noted for his depictions of French coastal scenes and particularly of Normandy. The painting was displayed at the Salon of 1842 held at the Louvre in Paris. Today it is in the collection of the Museum of Fine Arts in Nancy.

== Bibliography ==
- Leribault, Christophe. Eugène Isabey. Louvre, 2012.
- Miquel, Pierre. Eugène Isabey, 1803-1886. Martinelle, 1980.
