= Jean-Augustin Franquelin =

French painter

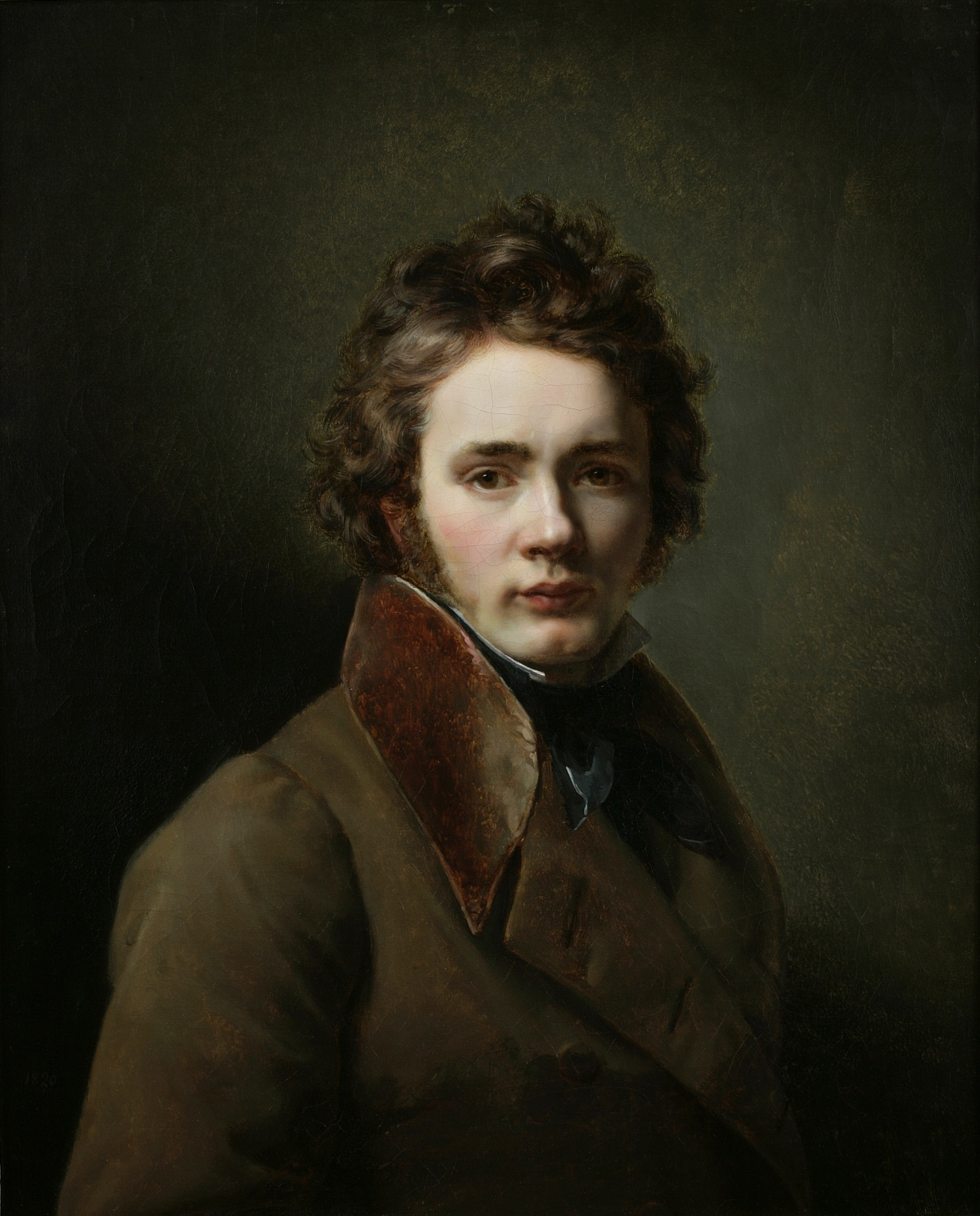
- Jean-Auguste Franquelin, Self-portrait, 1820 (private collection)
- Born: 1 September 1798
- Died: 4 January 1839 (aged 40); Paris
- Occupation: Painter

Jean-Augustin Franquelin (French pronunciation: [ʒɑ̃ oɡystɛ̃ fʁɑ̃klɛ̃]; 1798 – 1839), was instructed by Regnault, and became known through his works, representing scenes in public life, conversation-pieces, &c., which have often been copied. The painting of The Occupation of Brissac, by this artist, is at Versailles.
