= Salon of 1842 =

1842 art exhibition in Paris

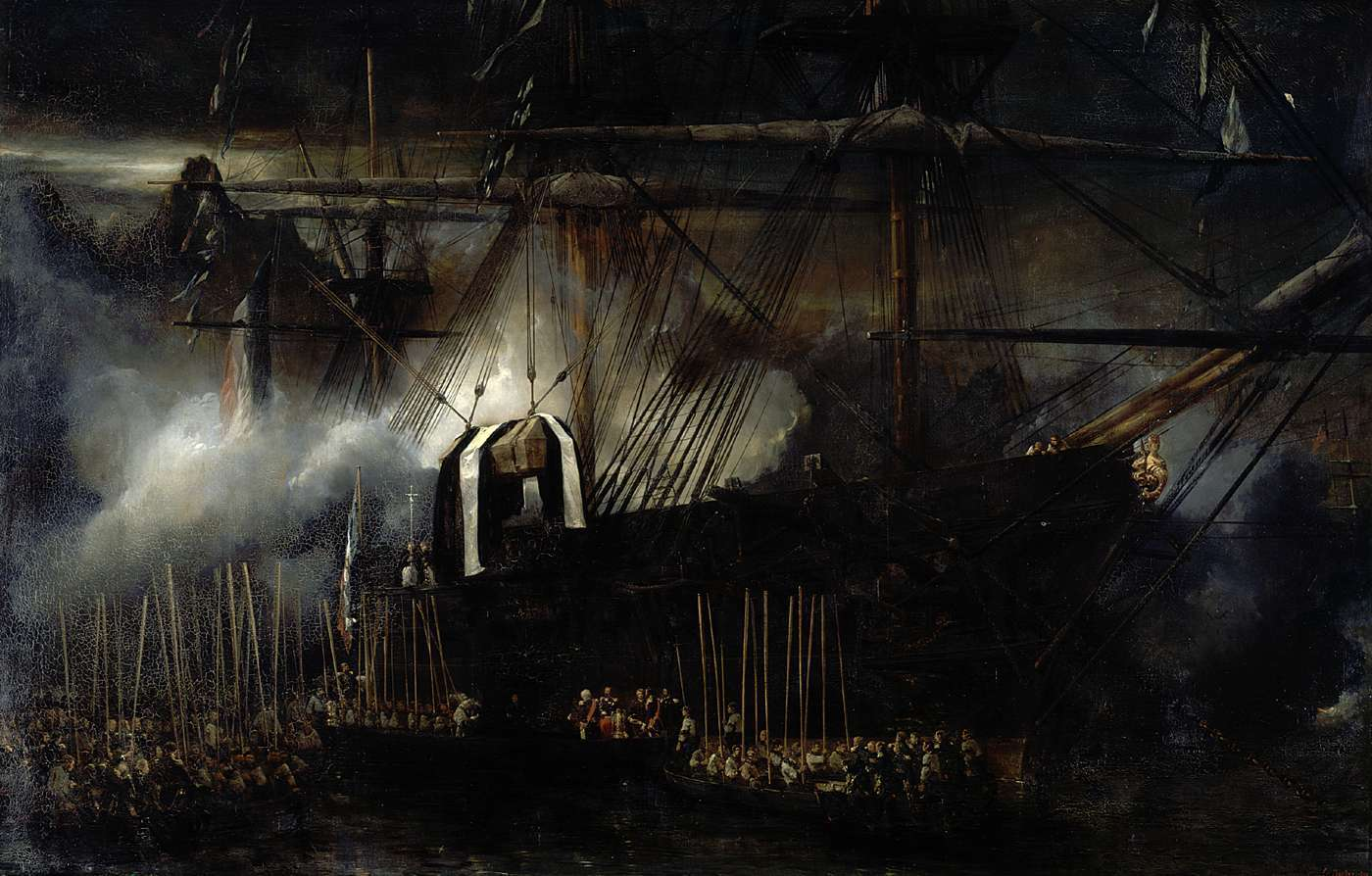
The Return of Napoleon by Eugène Isabey

The Salon of 1842 was an art exhibition staged at the Louvre in Paris as it was the annual edition of the Salon, the country's premier art exhibition overseen by the Academy of Fine Arts. It took place during the era of the July Monarchy of Louis Philippe I and included submissions from leading painters and sculptors. Amongst the works on display were those which reflected the ongoing influence of Romanticism.

Eugène Isabey's submissions included The Return of Napoleon featuring a night time view of the return of the former Emperor Napoleon during Retour des cendres, nearly twenty years after he had died in exile on Saint Helena. He also displayed a landscape, The Town and Port of Dieppe. In portraiture the German artist Franz Xaver Winterhalter displayed a picture of Maria Amalia of Naples and Sicily, the queen of France. Adrien Dauzats produced The Battle of Almanza for a commission by the king, although it was not added to the Galerie des Batailles at the Palace of Versailles. Théodore Chassériau presented the nude biblical scene The Toilette of Esther. The British painter Thomas Jones Barker exhibited three works including Parisina.

== Gallery ==
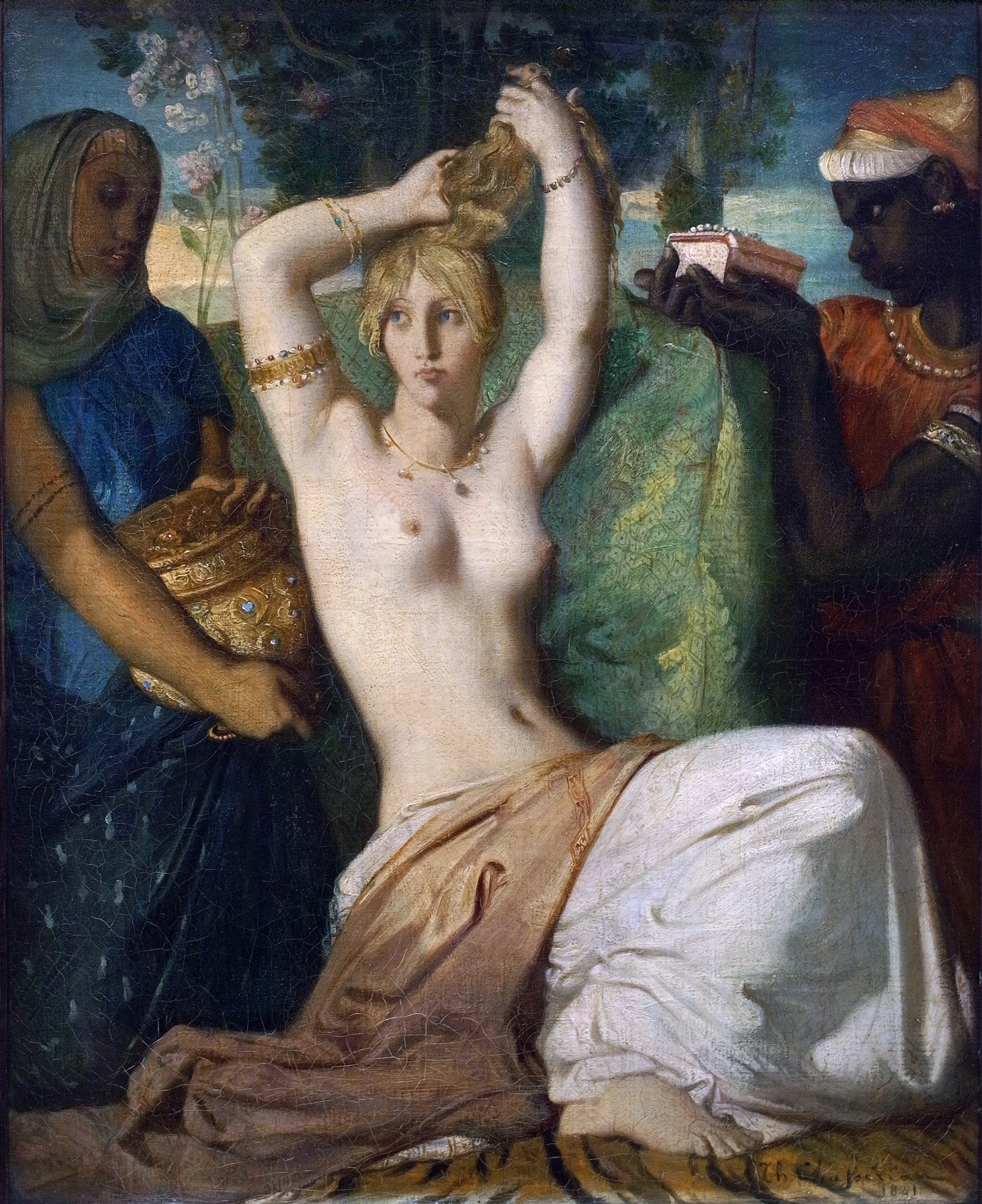
The Toilette of Esther by Théodore Chassériau

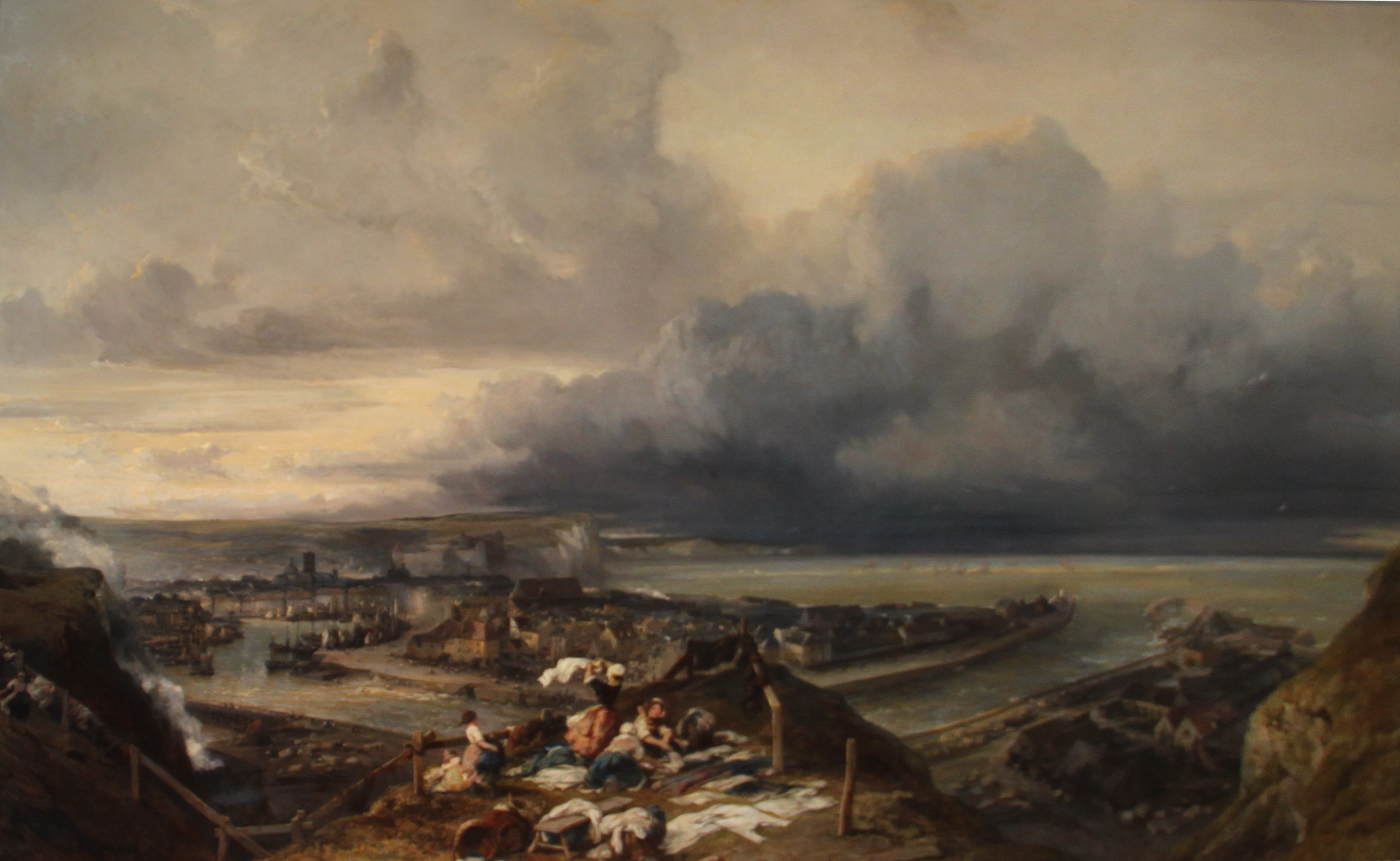
The Town and Port of Dieppe by Eugène Isabey

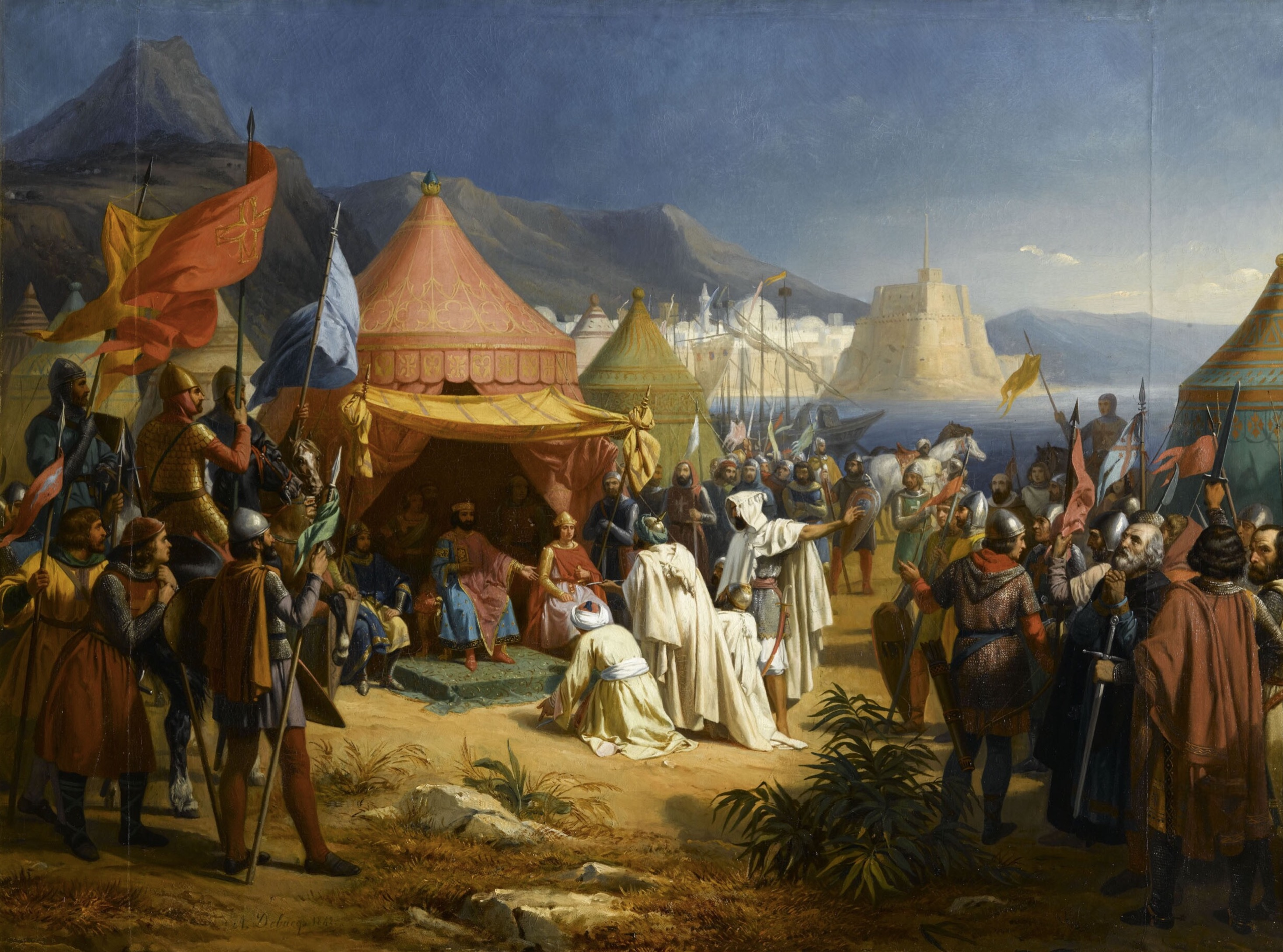
The Capture of Tripoli by Charles-Alexandre Debacq

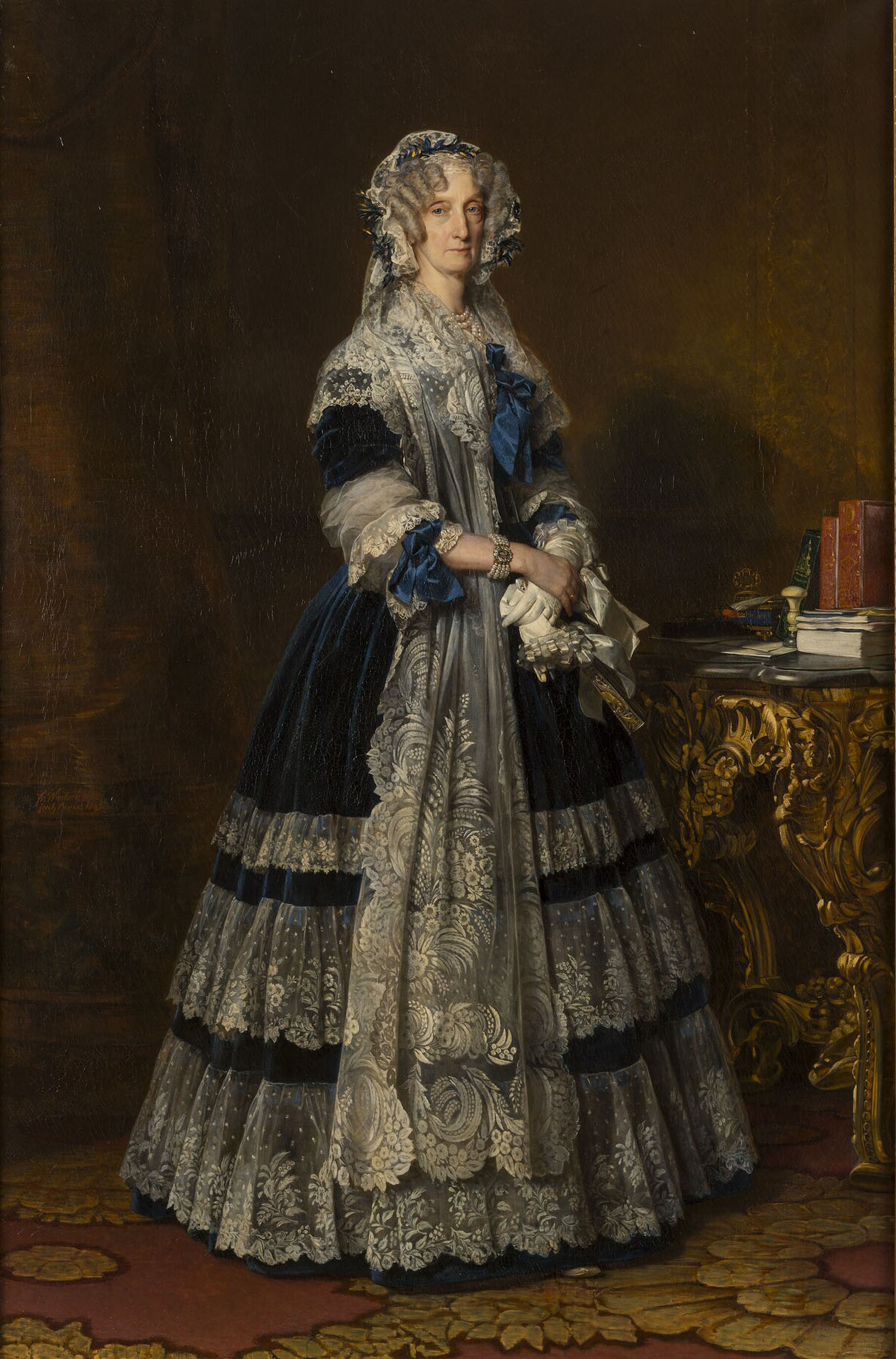
Portrait of Maria Amalia by Franz Xaver Winterhalter

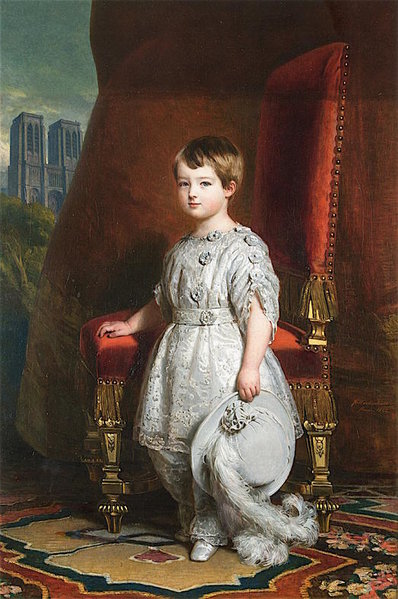
Portrait of Philippe of Orléans by Franz Xaver Winterhalter

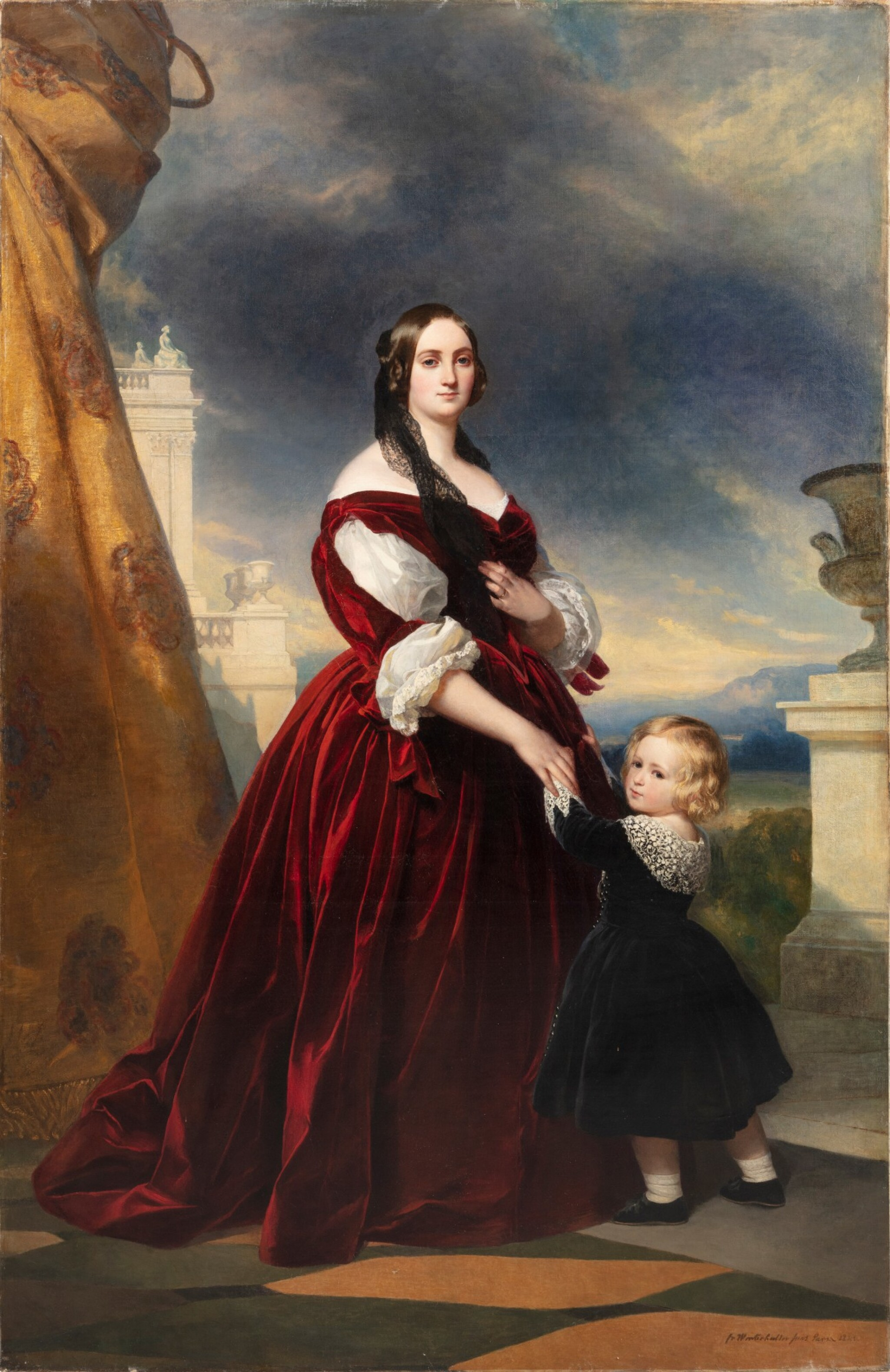
Countess Duchâtel with Her son by Franz Xaver Winterhalter

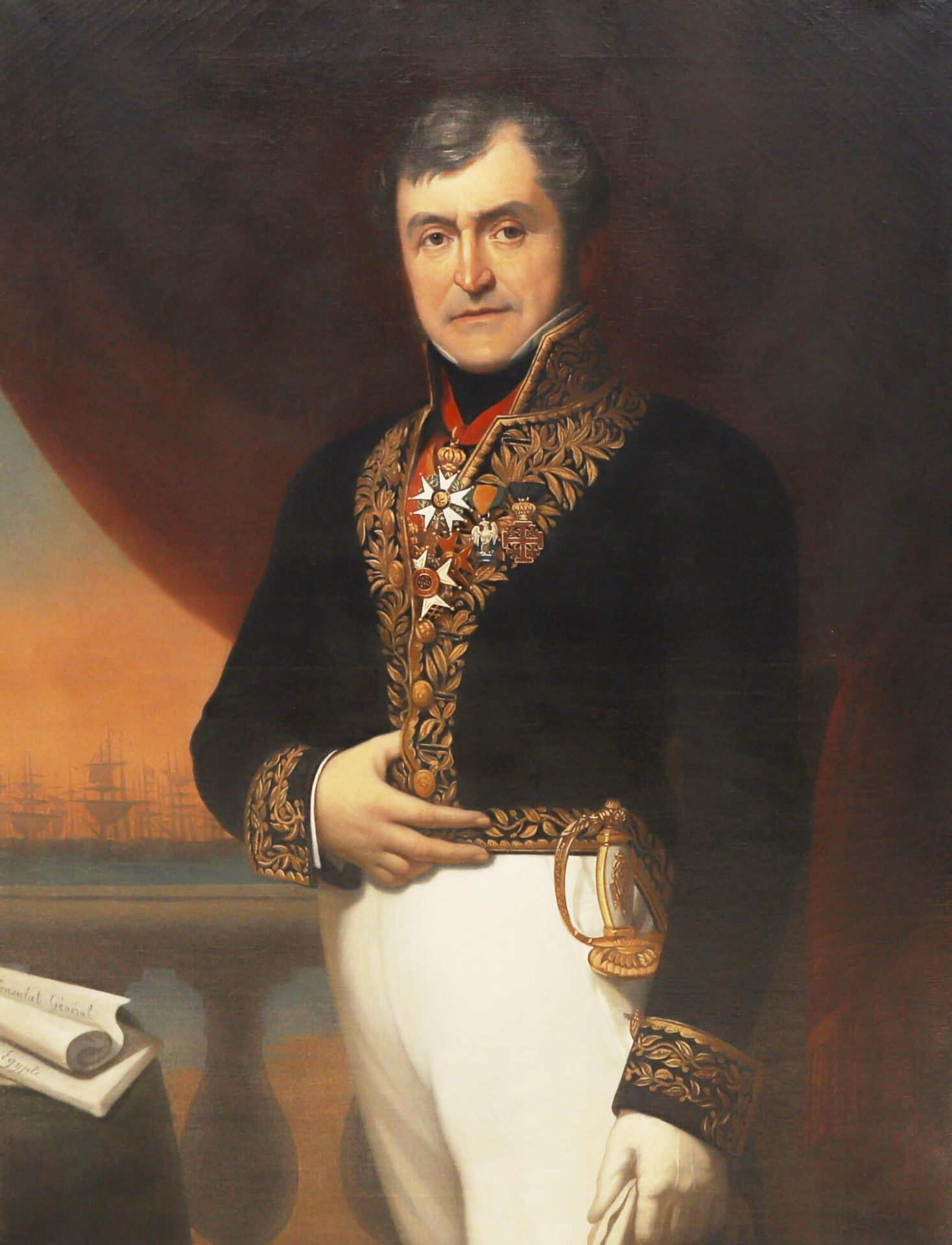
Portrait of Adrien-Louis Cochelet by Louis-Jean-Baptiste Bourdon

The Sword of Damocles by Léon Viardot

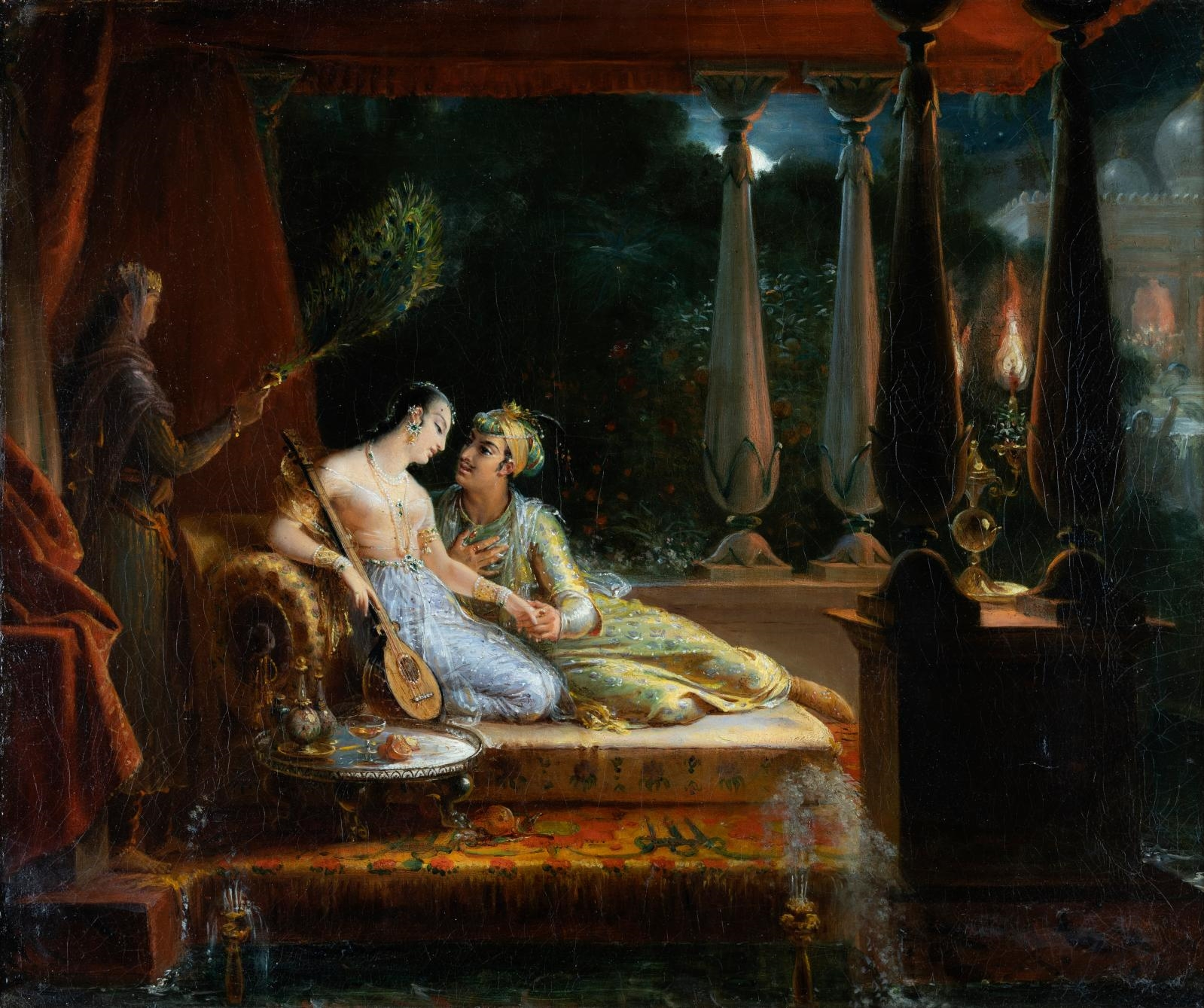
Scheherazade and Shahryar by Marie-Éléonore Godefroid

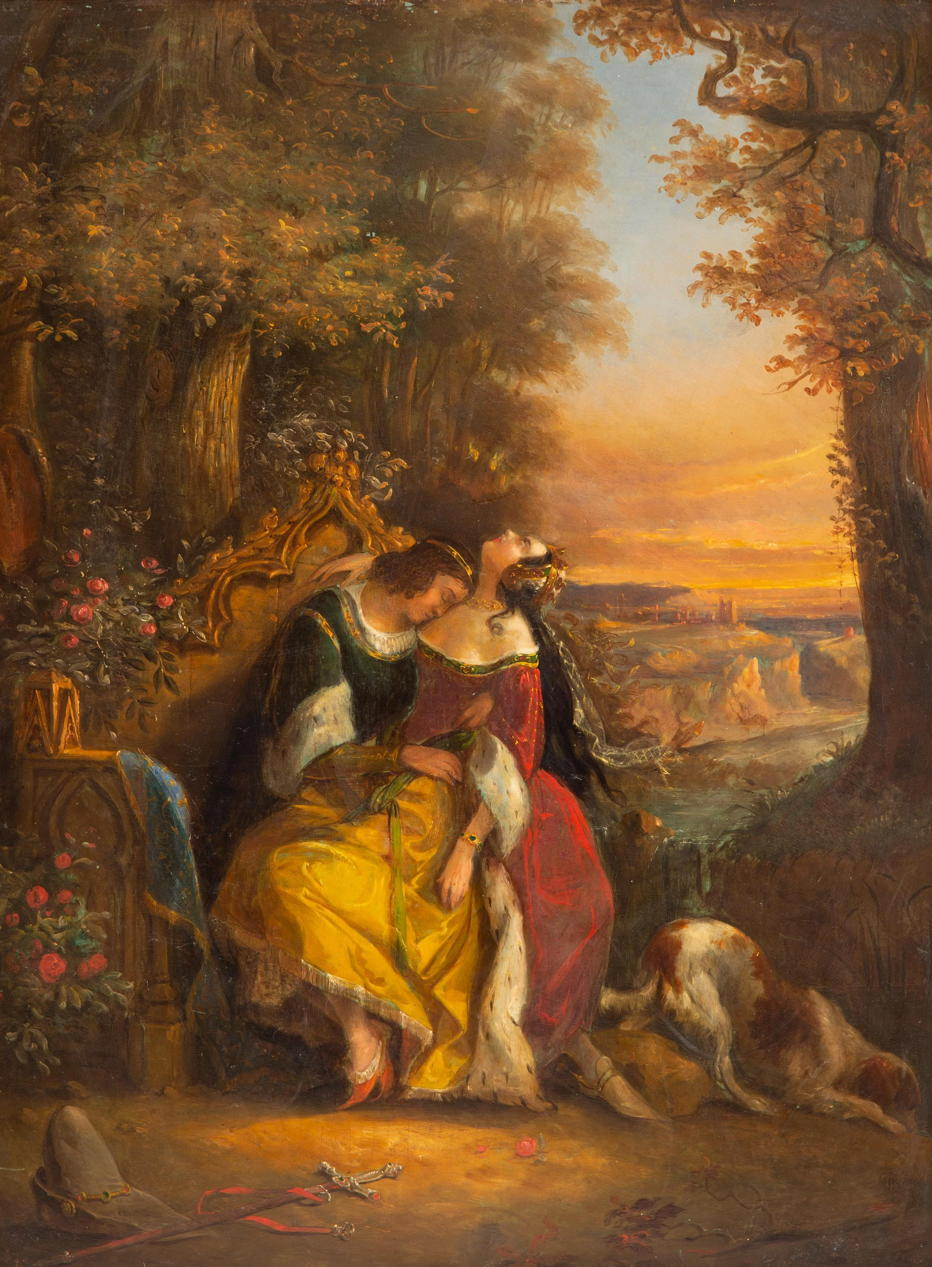
Parisina by Thomas Jones Barker

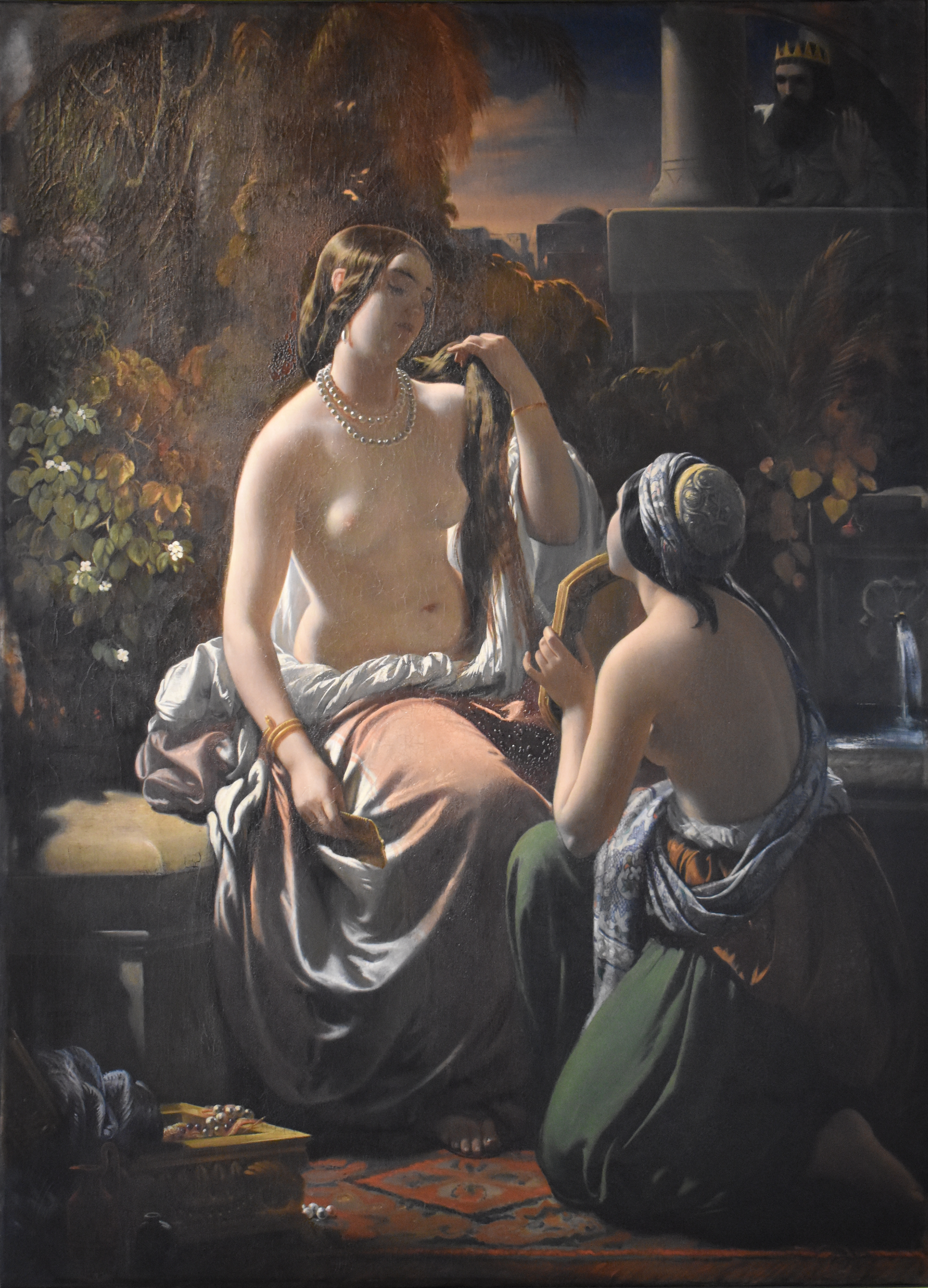
Bathsheba at Her Bath by Joseph Léon Roland de Lestang-Parade

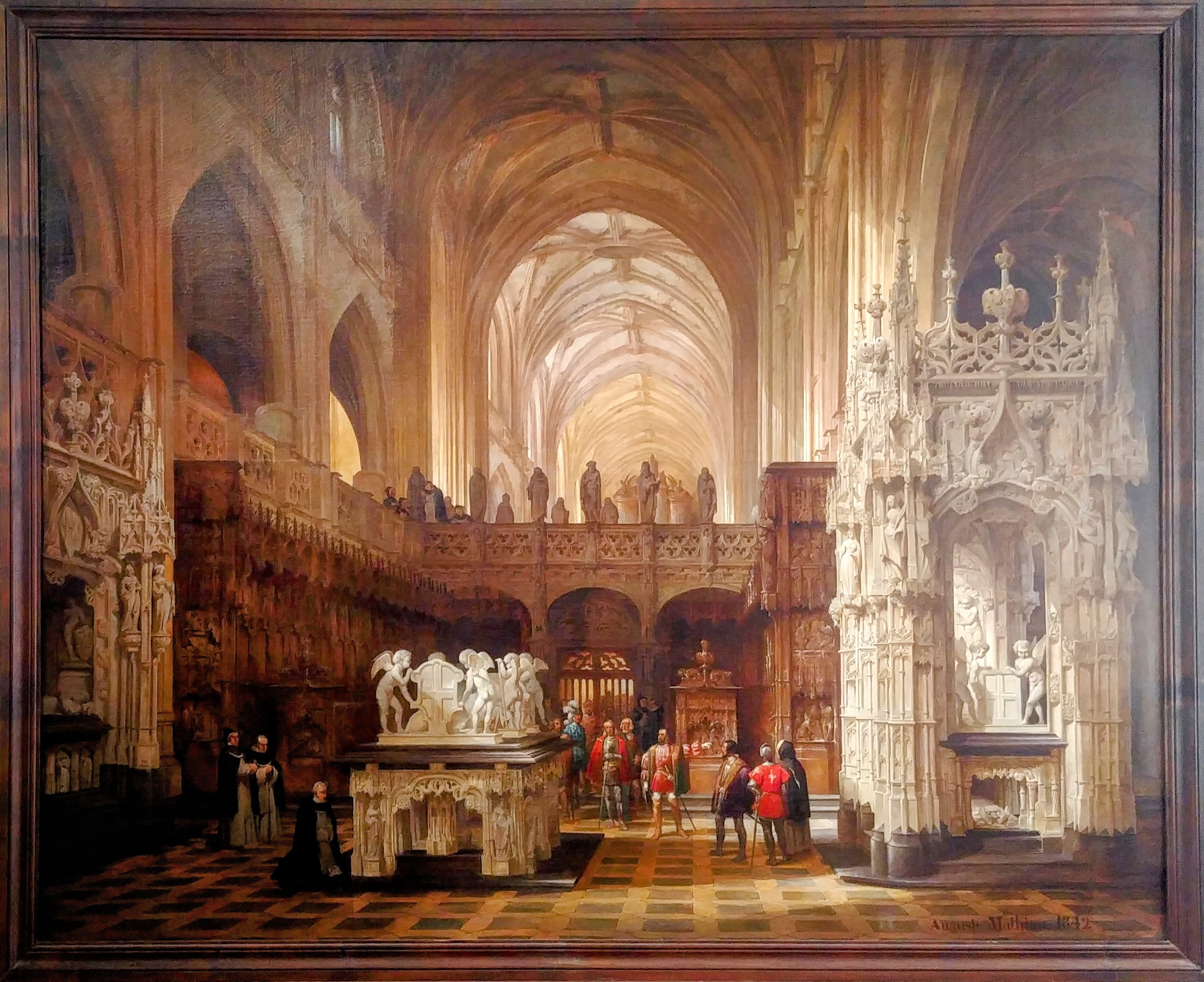
Francis I Visiting the Monastery of Brou by Auguste Mathieu

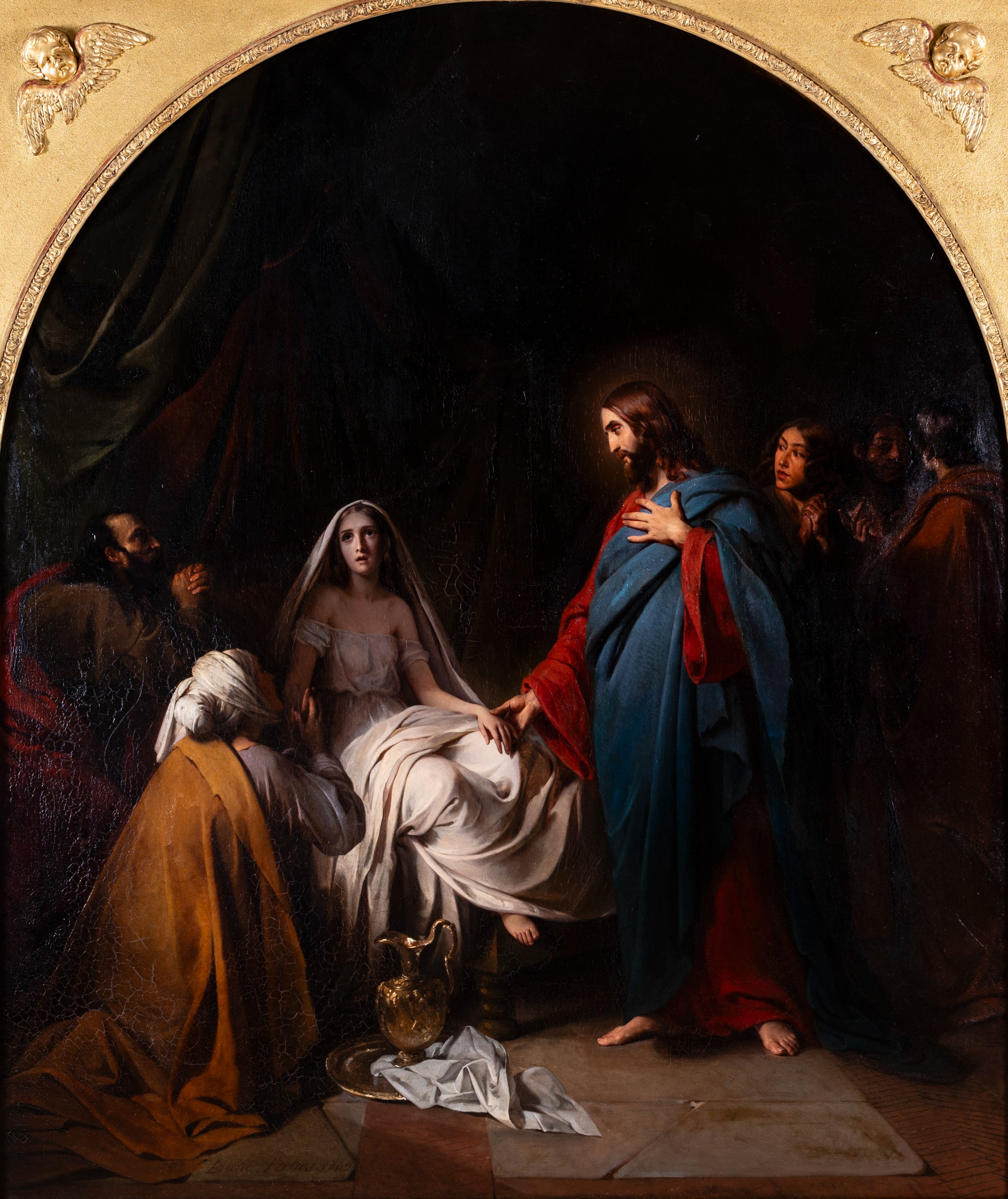
The Raising of the Daughter of Jairus by Aimée Brune-Pagès

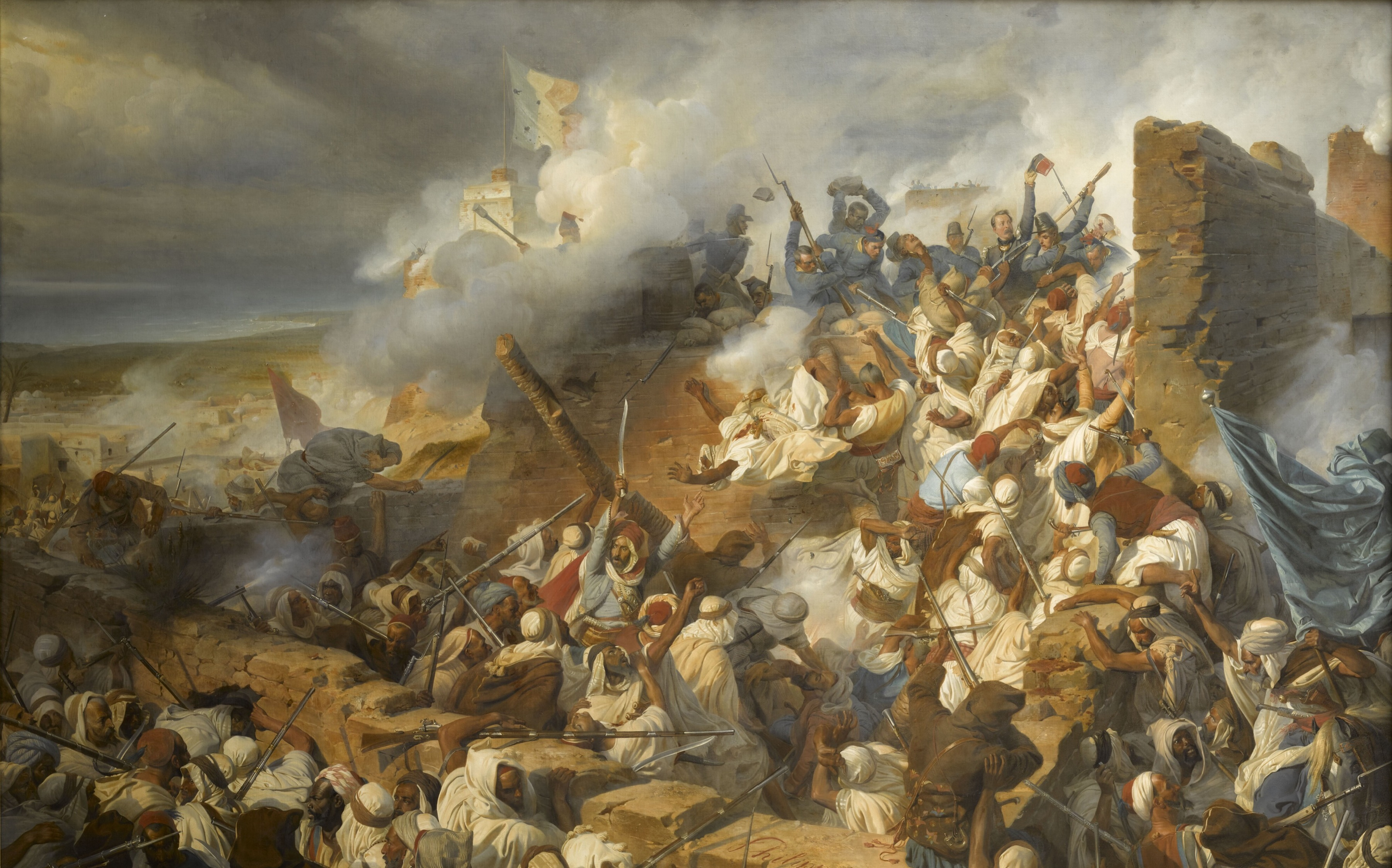
The Defence of Mazagran by Henri Félix Emmanuel Philippoteaux

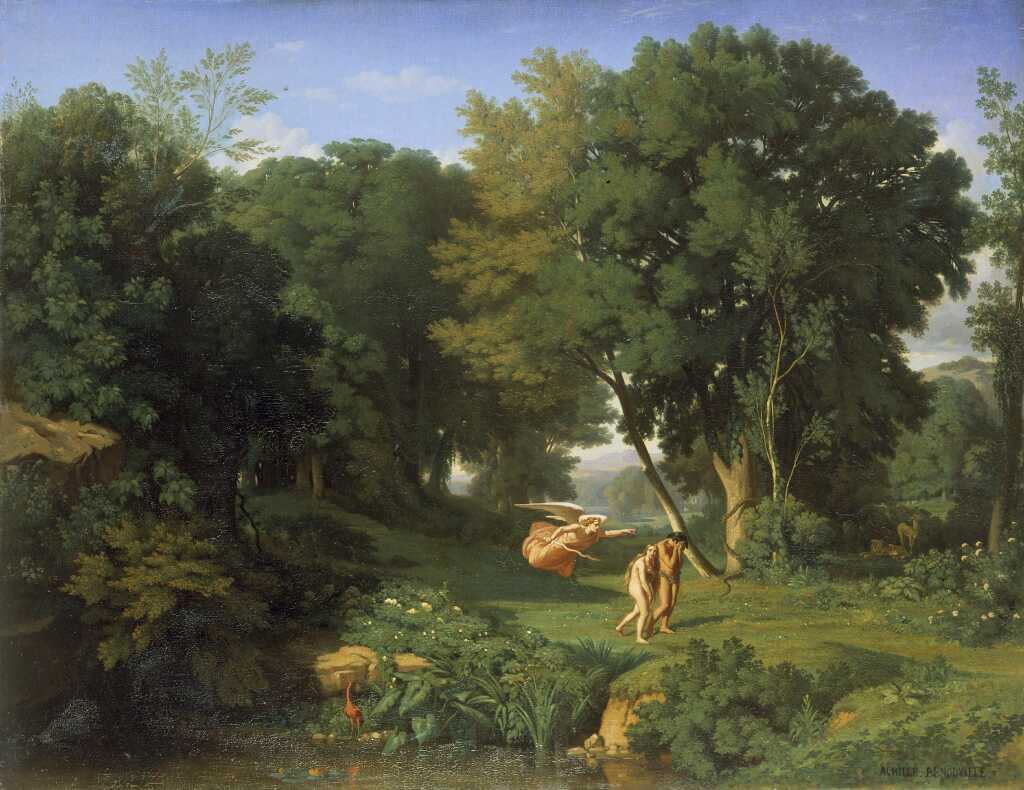
Adam and Eve Chased out of Paradise by Jean-Achille Benouville

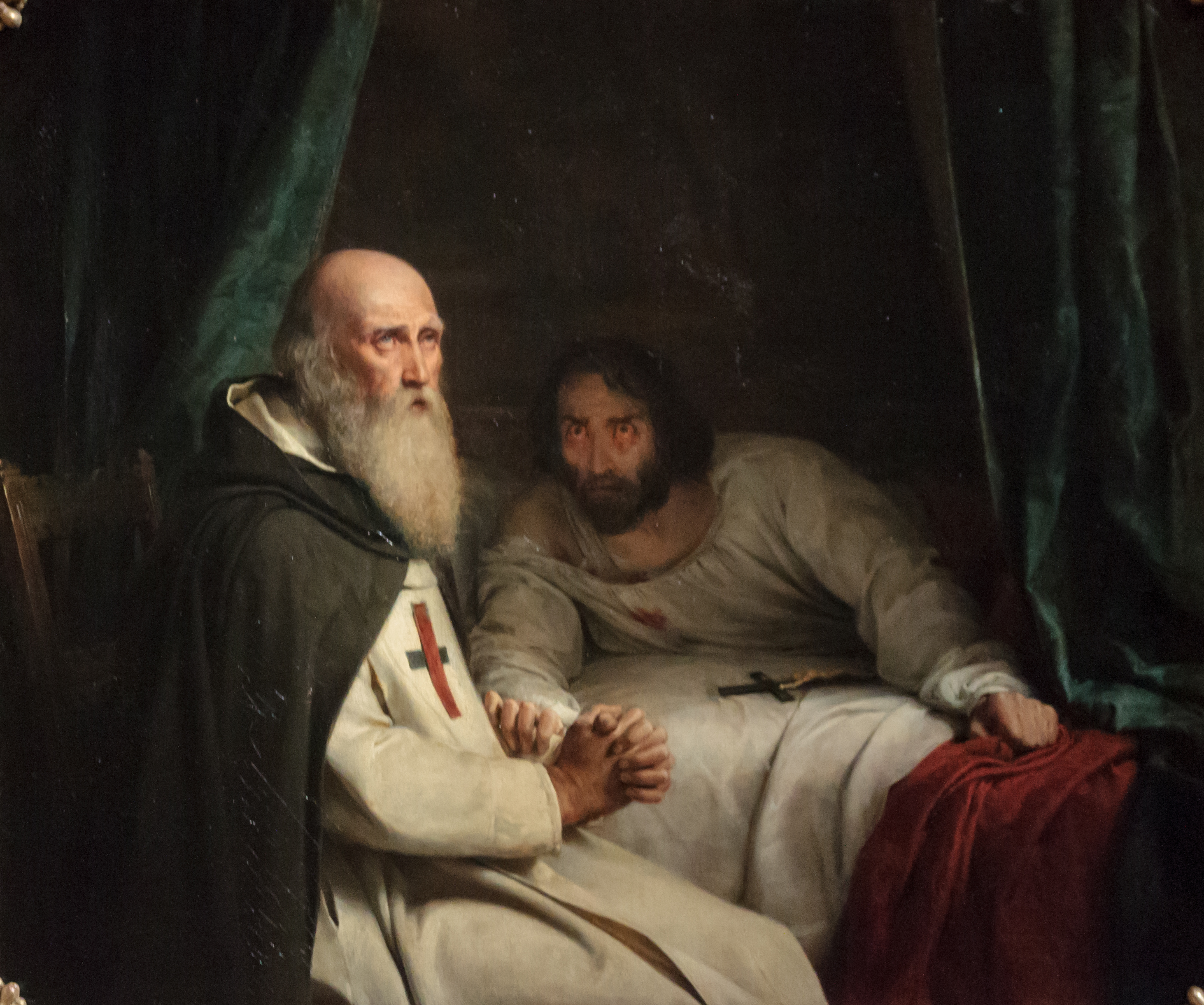
The Confession by Marie Amelie Cogniet

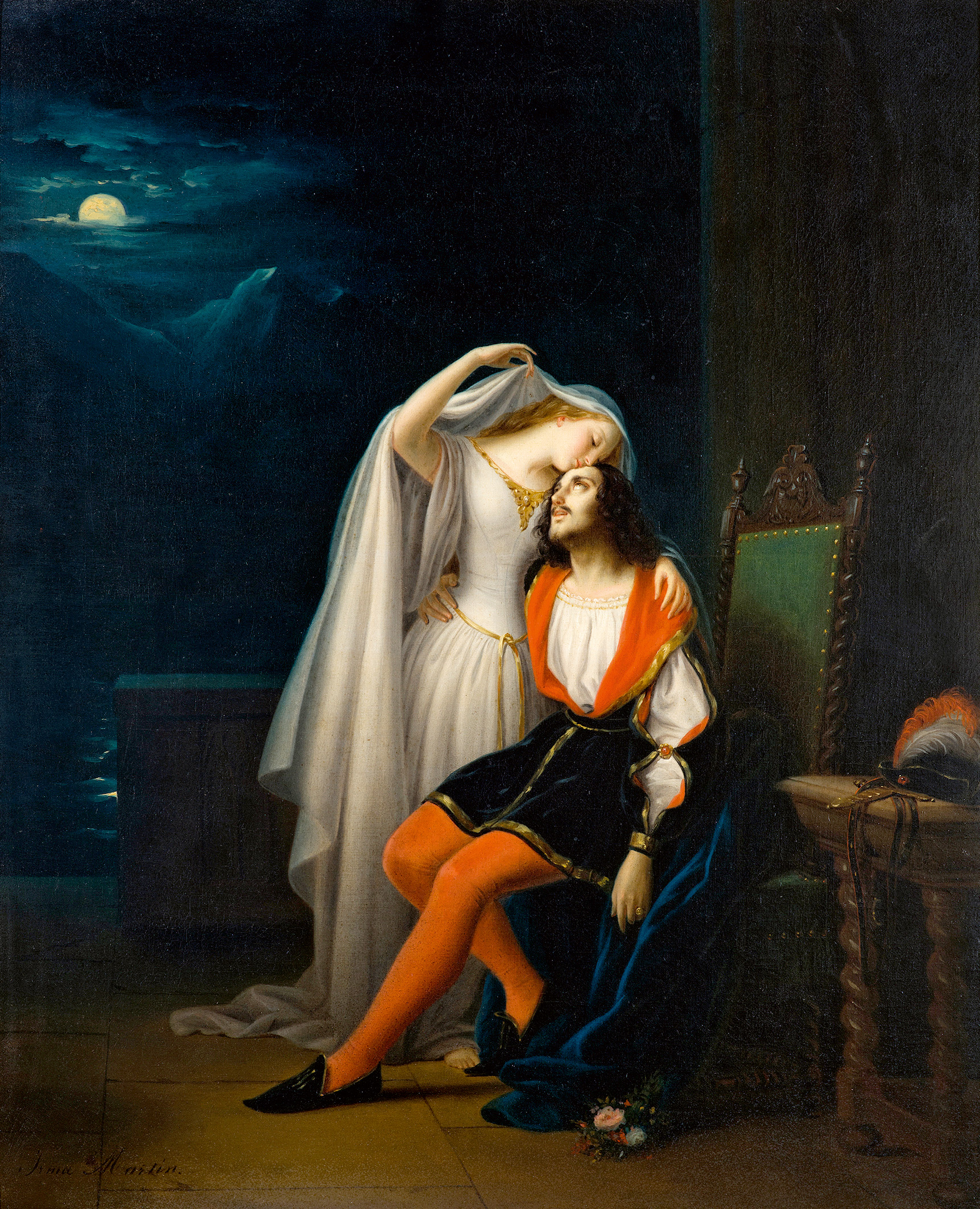
Ondine donne à son mari le baiser qui doit le faire mourir by Irma Martin

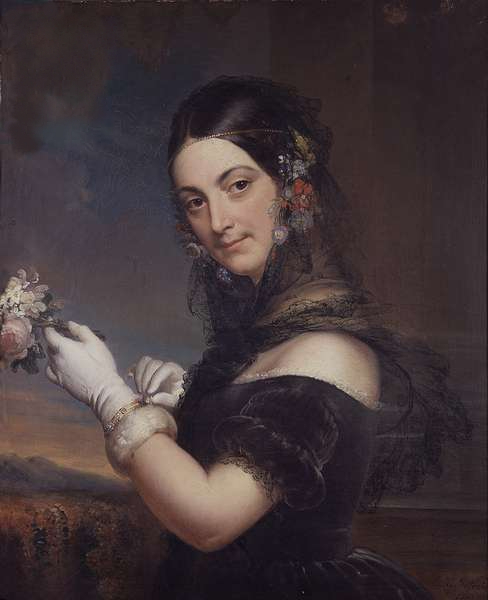
Portrait of Elena Vigano by Marie-Eleonore Godefroid

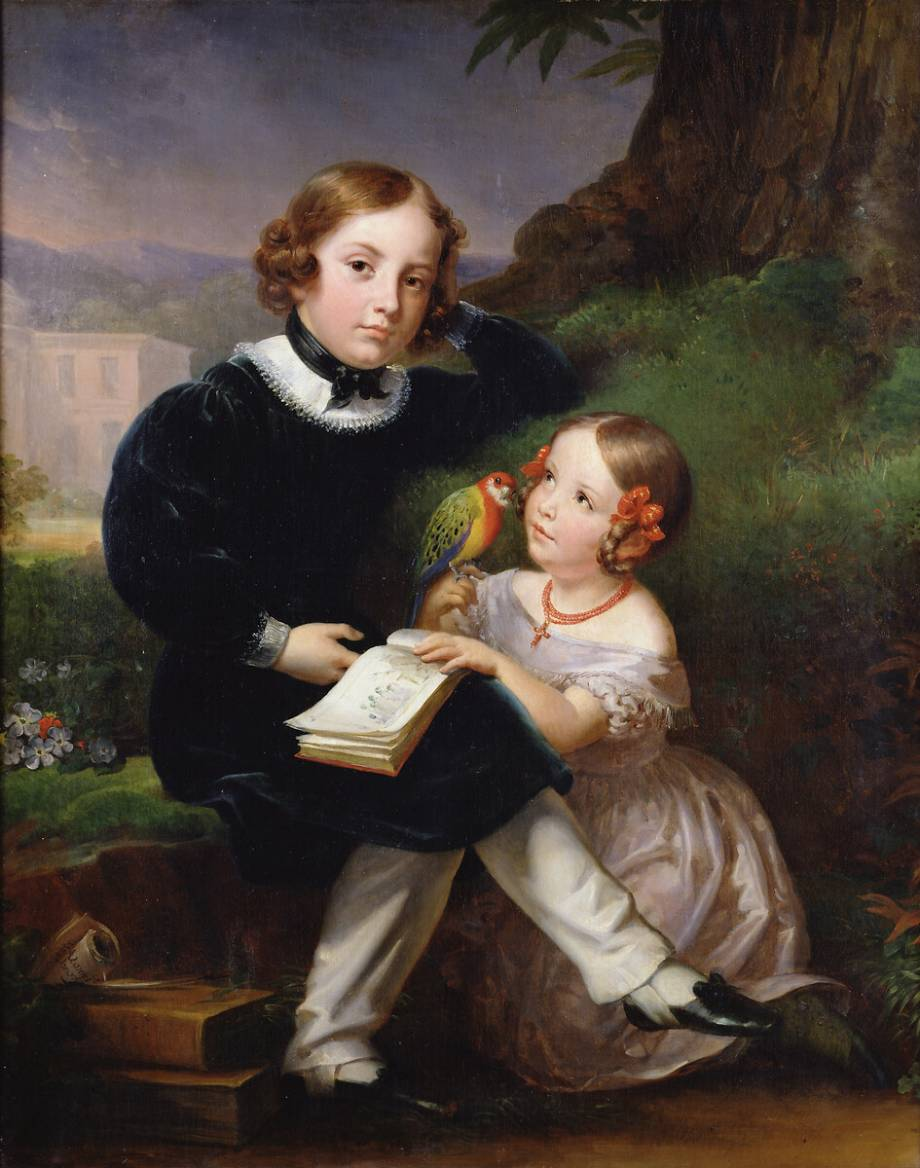
The children of Pierre-Jean David d'Angers by Marie-Eleonore Godefroid

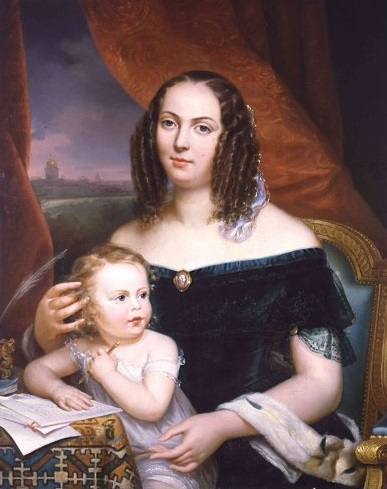
Louise Colet and Henriette by Adèle Grasset

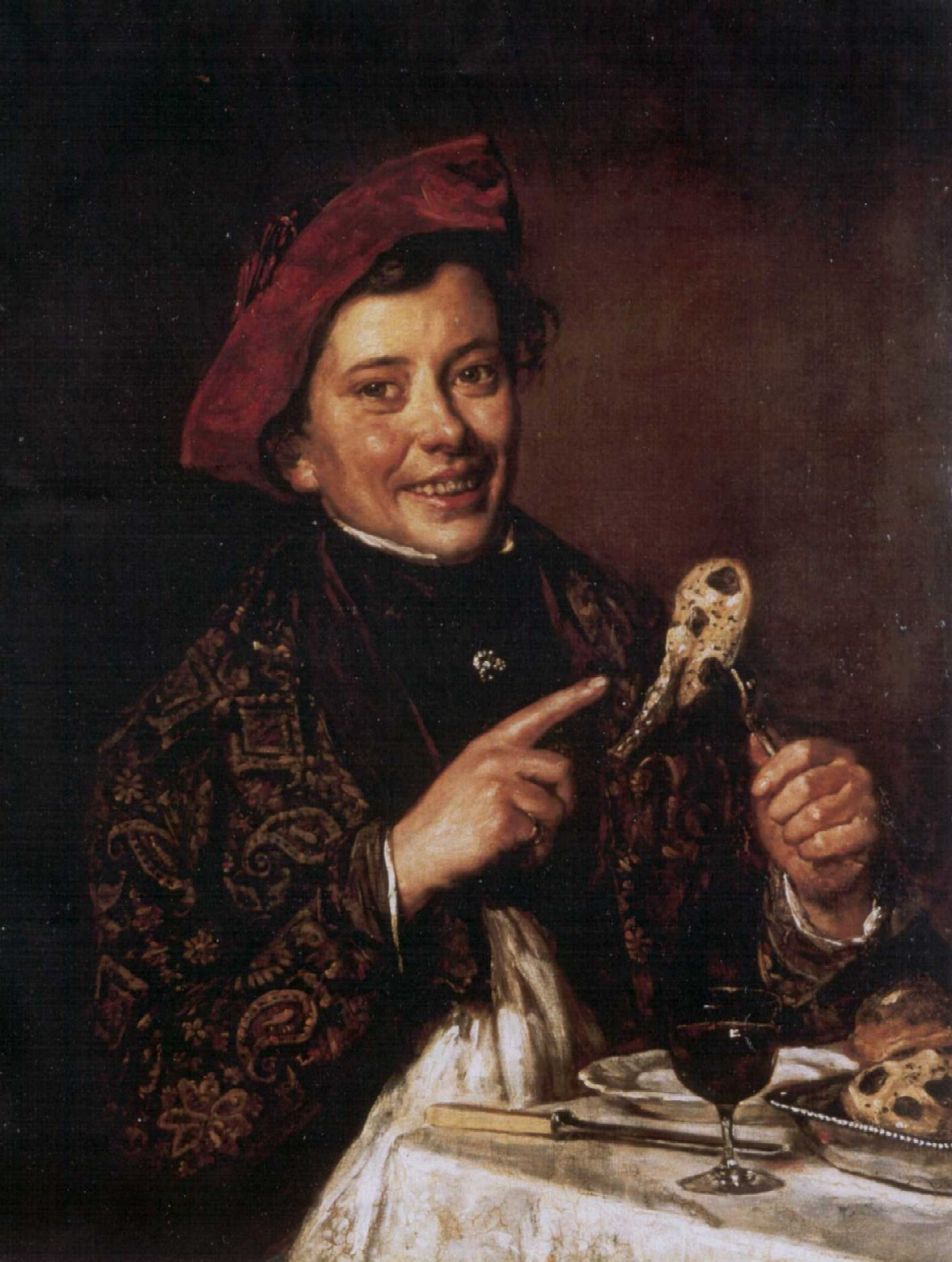
Portrait of Alexis Soyer by Emma Soyer

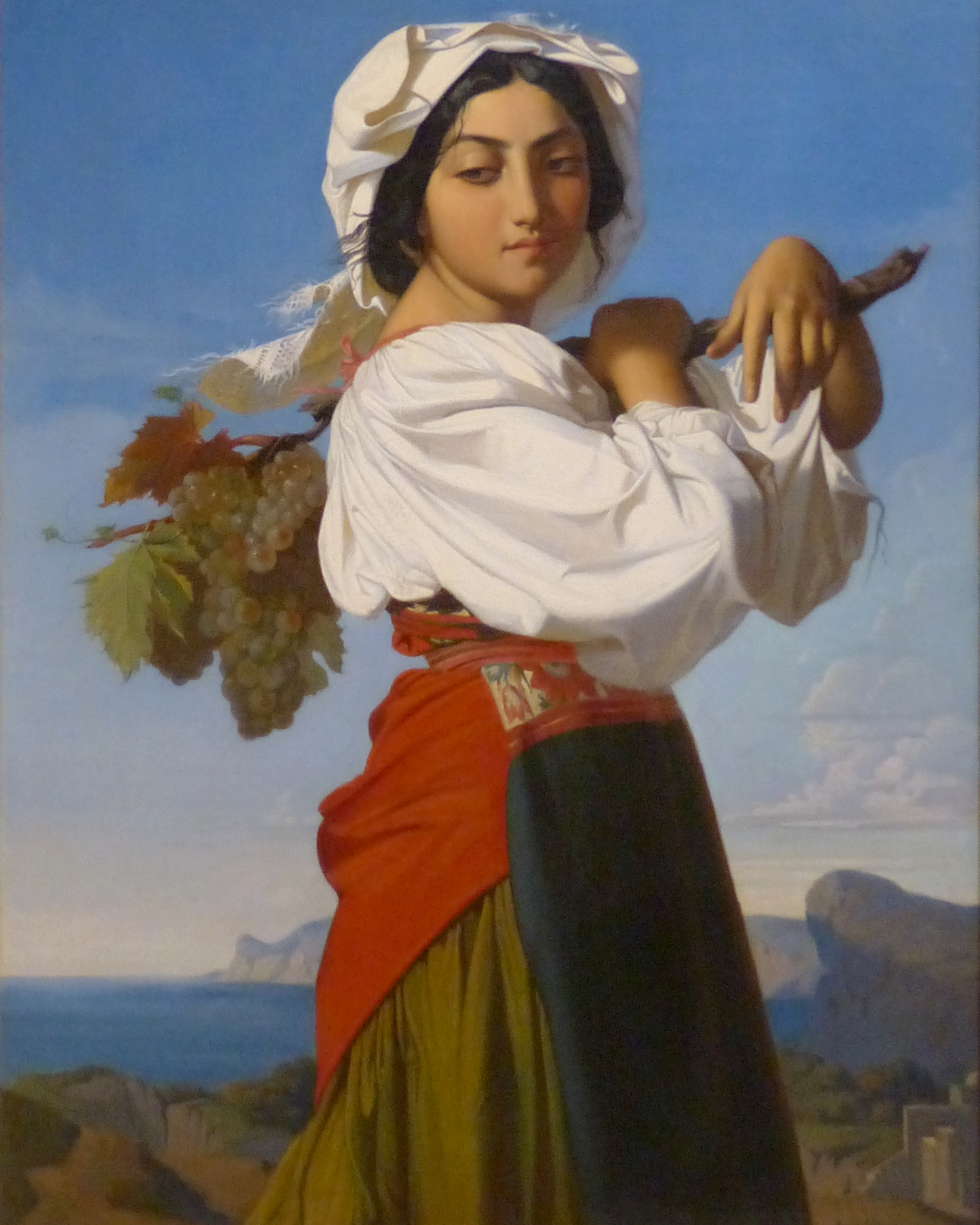
Mariuccia by Henri Lehmann

== See also ==
- Royal Academy Exhibition of 1842, held at the National Gallery in London

== Bibliography ==
- Allard, Sébastien, Loyrette, Henri & Des Cars, Laurence. Nineteenth Century French Art: From Romanticism to Impressionism, Post-Impressionism and Art Nouveau. Rizzoli International Publications, 2007.
- Allard, Sébastien & Fabre, Côme. Delacroix. Metropolitan Museum of Art, 2018.
- Norman, Geraldine. Nineteenth-century Painters and Painting: A Dictionary. University of California Press, 1977.
- Pomerède, Vincent & Trébosc, Delphine. 1001 Paintings at the Louvre: From Antiquity to the Nineteenth Century. Musée du Louvre Editions, 2005.
- Thuillier, Jacques. History of Art. Flammarion, 2003.
- Zarobell, John. Empire of Landscape: Space and Ideology in French Colonial Algeria. Penn State Press, 2010.
