= Noel Paton =

Noel Paton may refer to:

- Joseph Noel Paton (1821–1901), Scottish artist, illustrator and sculptor
- Diarmid Noel Paton (1859–1928), his son, Scottish physician and academic
