= George Harvey (painter) =

Scottish painter

Sir George Harvey FRSE RSA
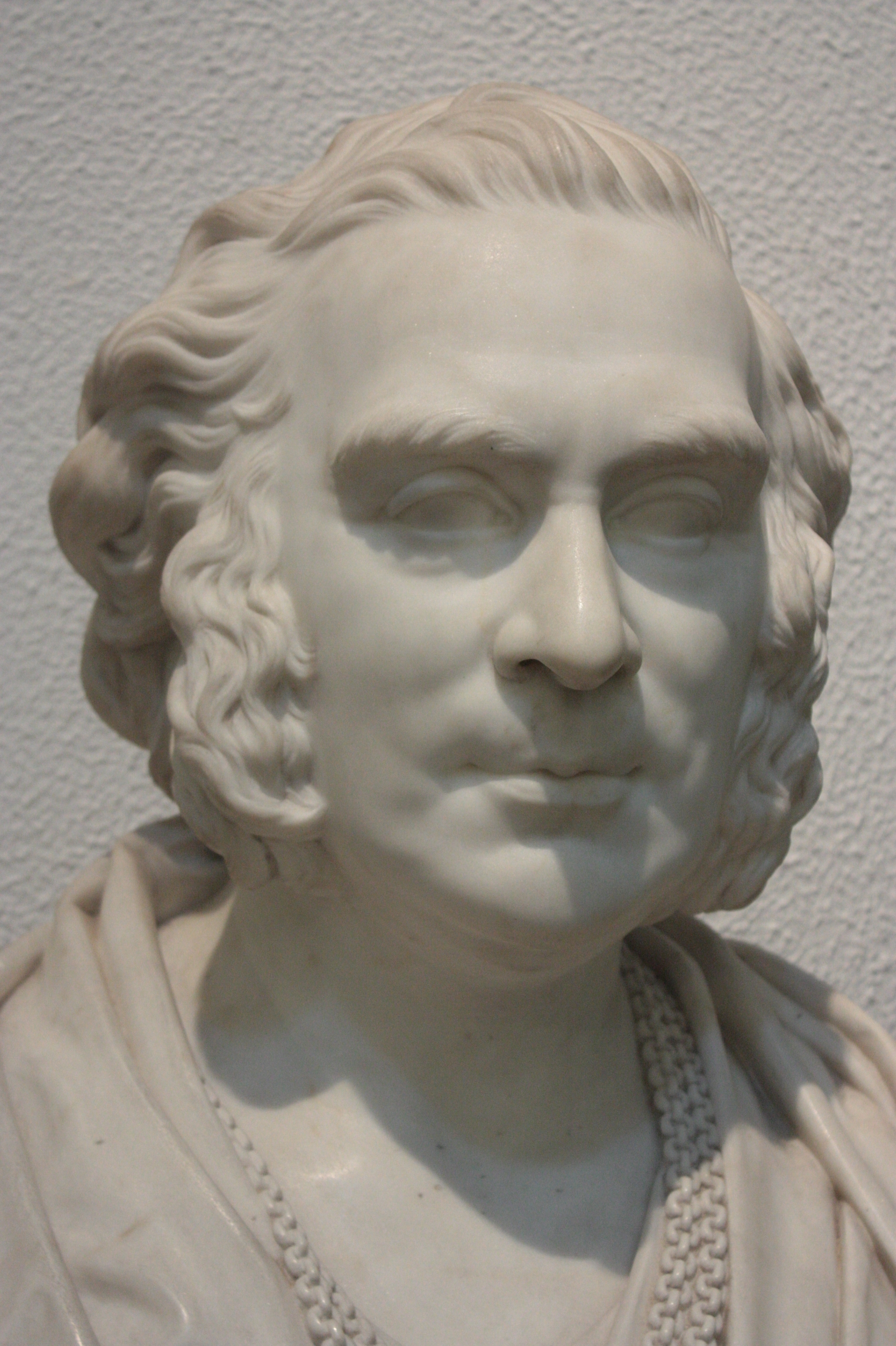
- Sir George Harvey by Amelia Robertson Hill
- Born: George Frederick Harvey; 1 February 1806; St Ninians, Scotland
- Died: 22 January 1876 (aged 69); Edinburgh, Scotland
- Resting place: Warriston Cemetery
- Education: Trustees' Academy; Edinburgh College of Art
- Occupation: Painter
- Spouses: Eliza Margaret Carstairs (m. 1837; died 1844) Margaret Muir (m. 1847; died 1854)

Sir George Frederick Harvey FRSE RSA (1 February 1806 – 22 January 1876) was a Scottish painter and President of the Royal Scottish Academy.

== Early life ==
He was the son of George Harvey, a watchmaker, and Elizabeth (née Jeffrey) Harvey, and was born at 59 Main Street, St Ninians, a small village near Stirling. His brother was Bailie Harvey was long active in Glasgow municipal affairs.

Soon after his birth his parents removed to Stirling, where George was apprenticed to Mr McLaren, a bookseller on Bow Street. His love for art having, however, become very decided, in his eighteenth year he entered the Trustees' Academy on Picardy Place in Edinburgh. Here he so distinguished himself that in 1826 he was invited by the Scottish artists, who had resolved to found what would become the Royal Scottish Academy, to join it as an associate.

== Career ==
Harvey's first picture, "A Village School," was exhibited in 1826 at the Edinburgh Institution; and from the time of the opening of the Academy in the following year he continued annually to exhibit. His best-known pictures are those depicting historical episodes in religious history from a puritan or evangelical point of view, such as "Covenanters' Preaching," "Covenanters' Communion," "John Bunyan and his Blind Daughter," "Sabbath Evening," and the "Quitting of the Manse."

He was, however, equally popular in Scotland for subjects not directly religious; and "The Bowlers," "A Highland Funeral," "The Curlers," "A Schule Skailin'," and "Children Blowing Bubbles in the Church-yard of Greyfriars', Edinburgh," manifest the same close observation of character, artistic conception and conscientious elaboration of details. In "The Night Mail" and "Dawn Revealing the New World to Columbus" the aspects of nature are, made use of in different ways, but with equal happiness, to lend impressiveness and solemnity to human concerns. He also painted landscapes and portraits.

In 1829 he was elected a fellow of the Royal Scottish Academy; in 1864 he succeeded Sir John Watson Gordon as president, a role which he held until 1876. He was knighted in 1867.

=== Published works ===
Sir George Harvey was the author of a paper on the "Colour of the Atmosphere," read before the Edinburgh Royal Society, and afterwards published with illustrations in Good Words; and in 1870 he published a small volume entitled Notes of the Early History of the Royal Scottish Academy. Selections from the Works of Sir George Harvey, PRSA, described by the Rev. AL Simpson, FSA Scot., and photographed by Thomas Annan, appeared at Edinburgh in 1869.

== Personal life ==
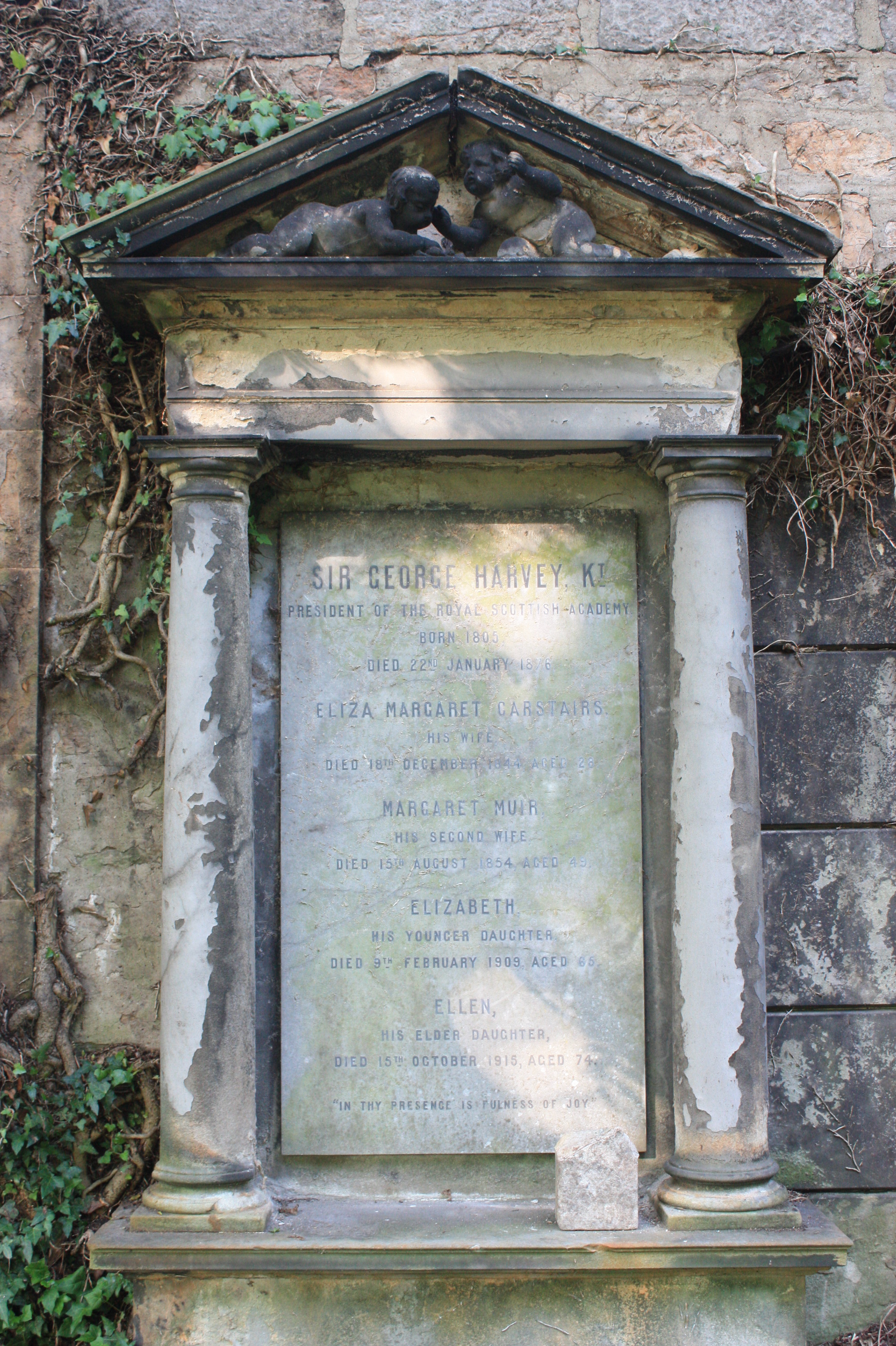
The grave of Sir George Harvey, Warriston Cemetery

He was married firstly to Eliza Margaret Carstairs (1818-1844) in 1839. Before her death, they were the parents of two daughters: Ellen Harvey and Elizabeth Harvey, neither of whom married.

After her death in 1844, he married, secondly, to Margaret Muir (1805–1854), a daughter of Helen (née Macfie) Muir, in 1847. She died in August 1854. His niece Nellie (or Nelly) Harvey (1865–1949) was also a painter.

He died at 21 Regent Terrace in Edinburgh on 22 January 1876. He is buried in Warriston Cemetery against the east wall, in the overgrown area just south of the former east gate.

== Gallery ==
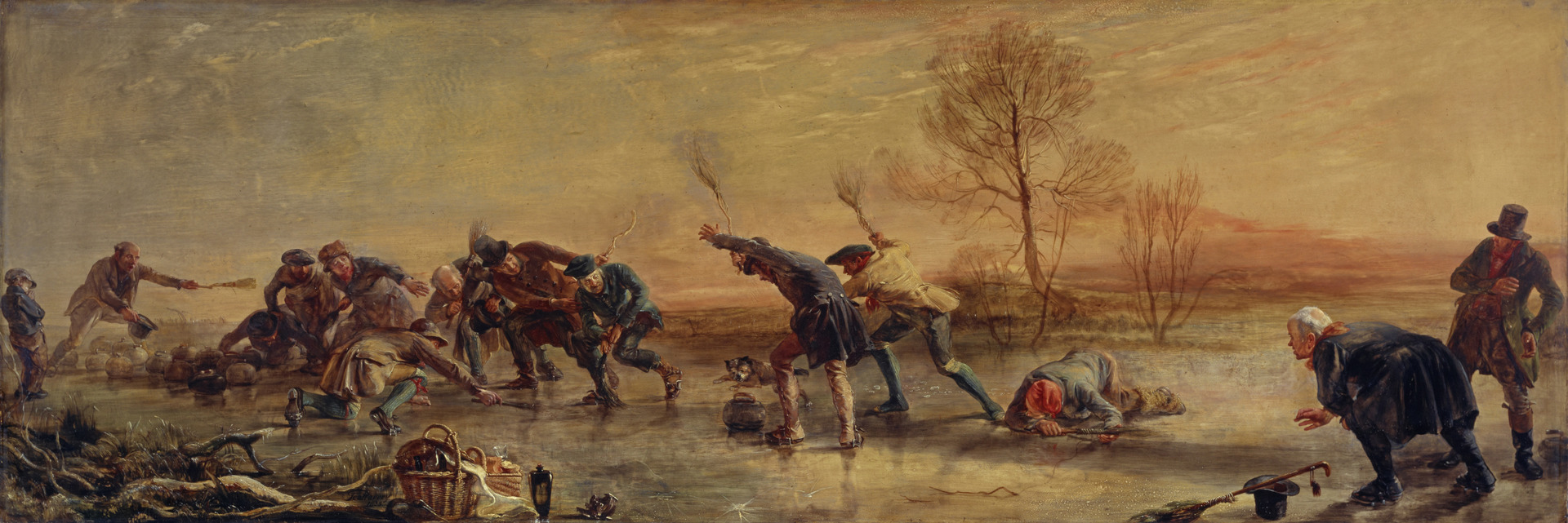
The Curlers (1835)

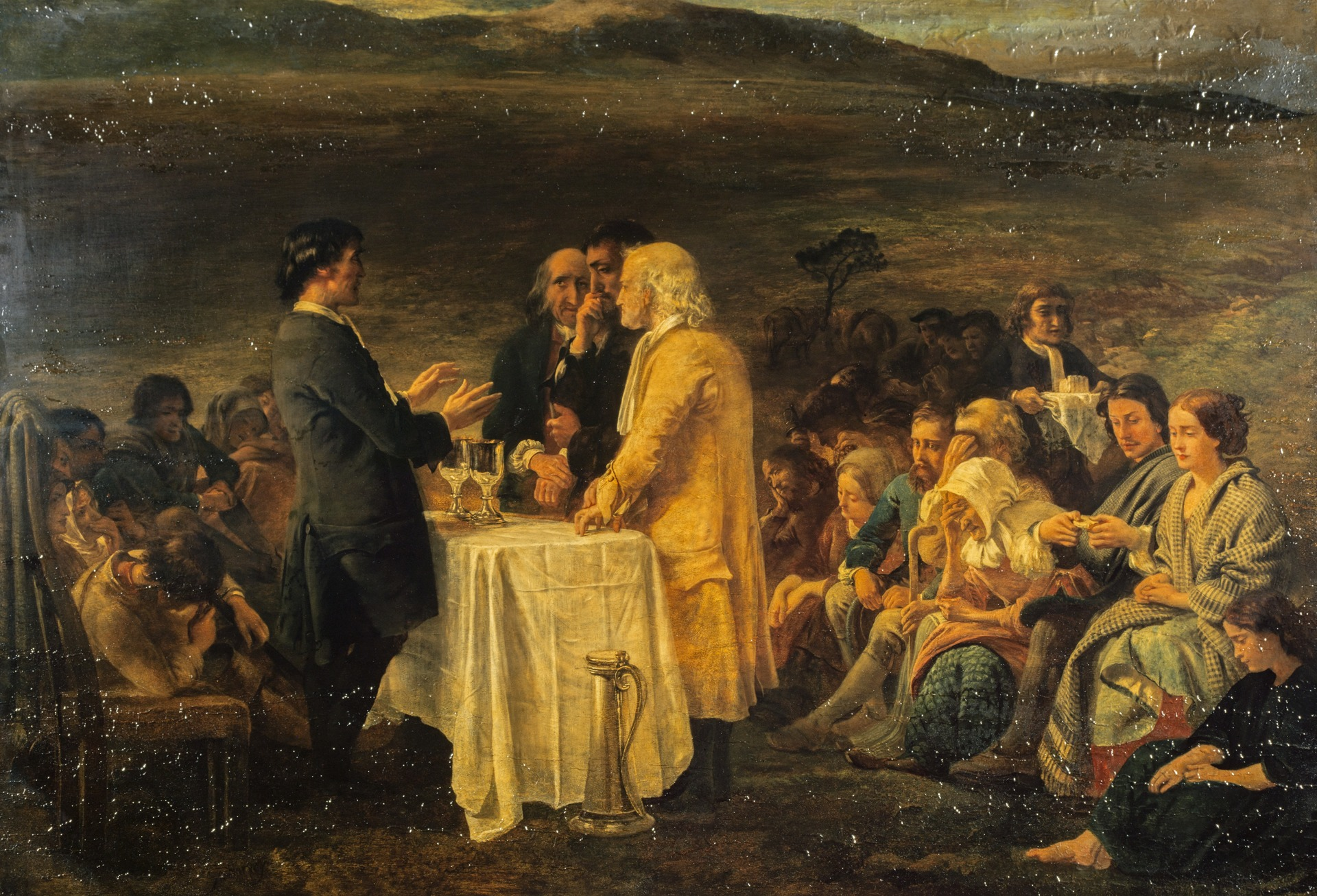
The Covenanters' Communion, National Galleries of Scotland

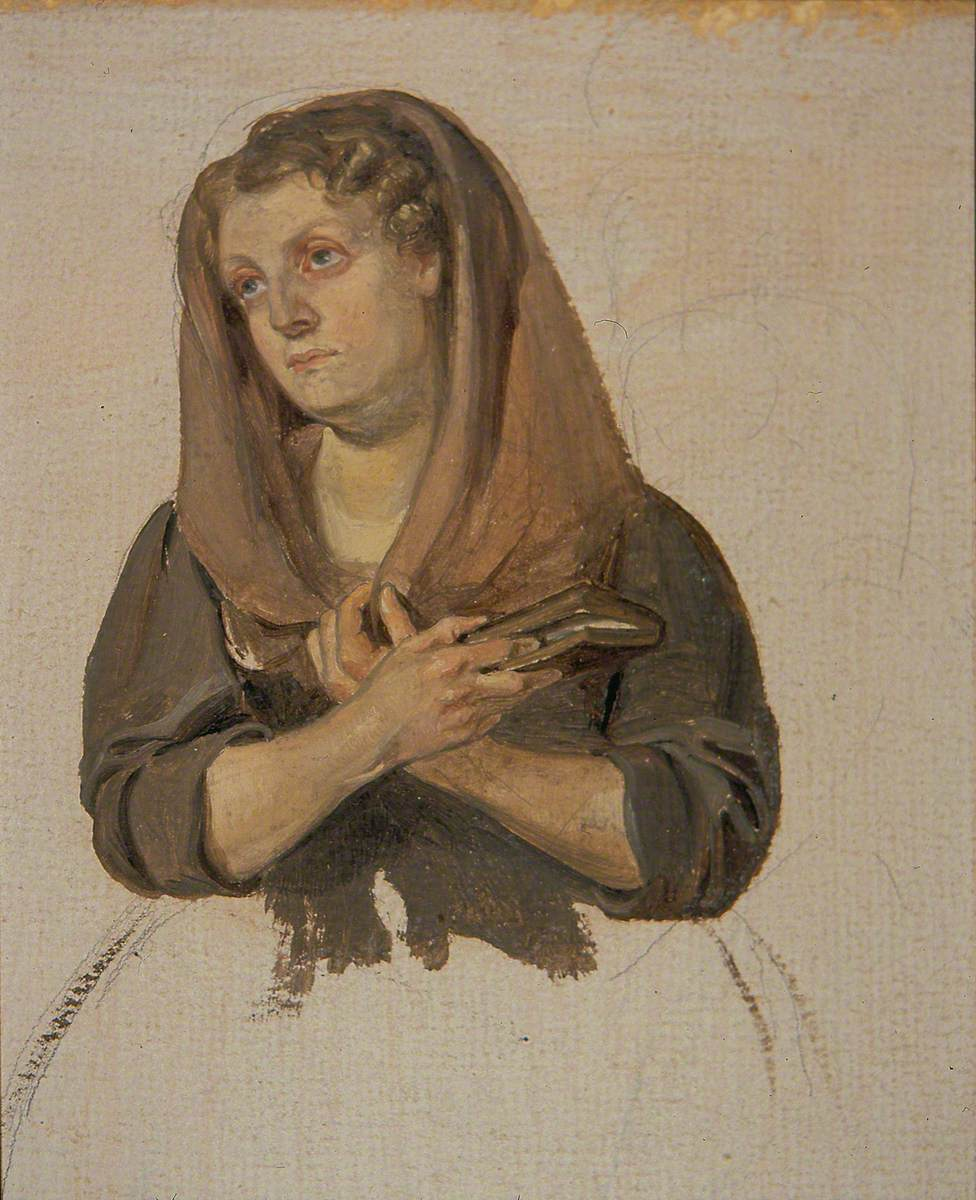
Woman Clasping the Bible, The Stirling Smith Art Gallery & Museum

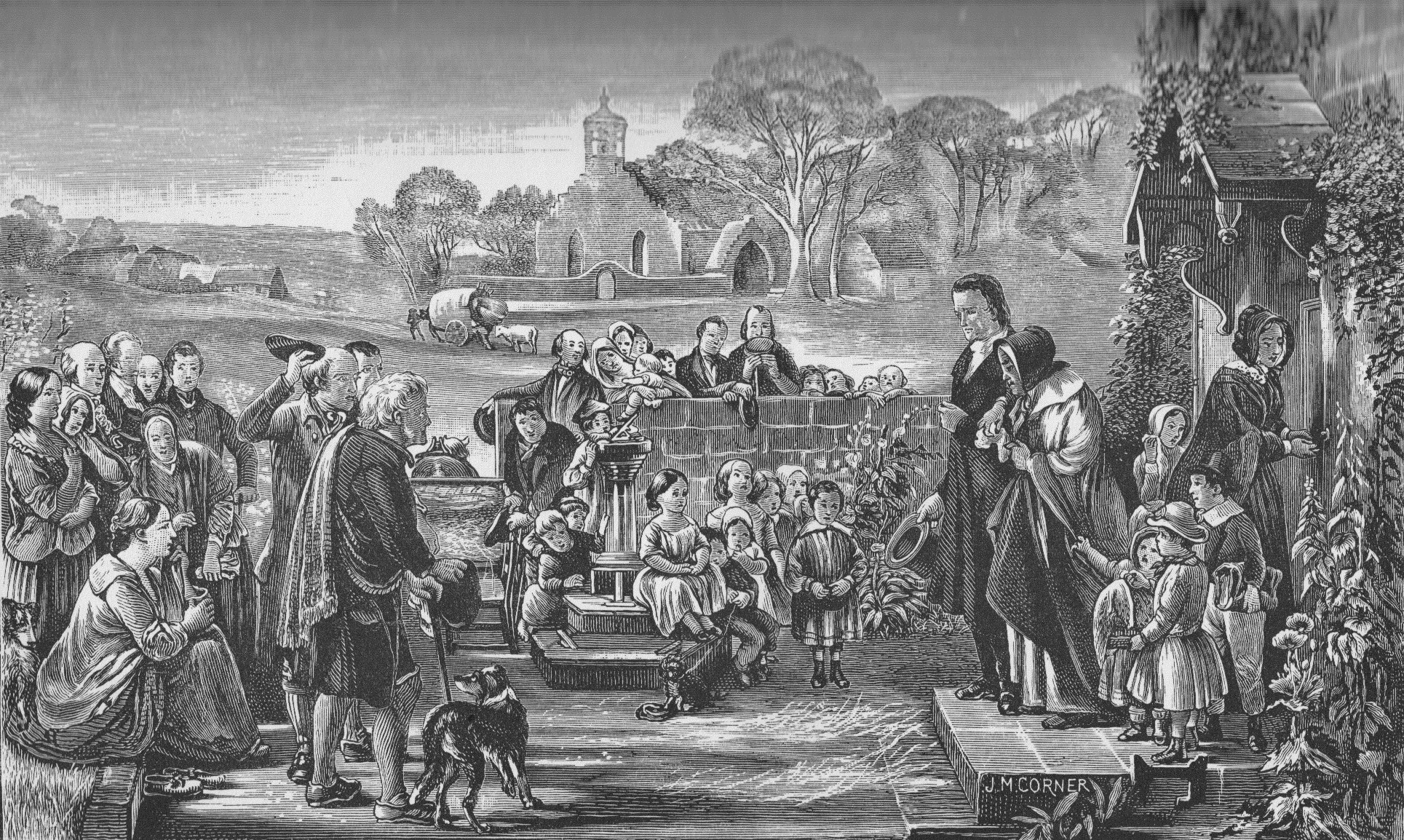
Leaving the Manse (engraving J. M. Corner) based on Harvey's oil painting, Quitting The Manse (Note: The original oil painting is rarely on display due to bad bitumen damage caused by Harvey's experiments with varnish.)

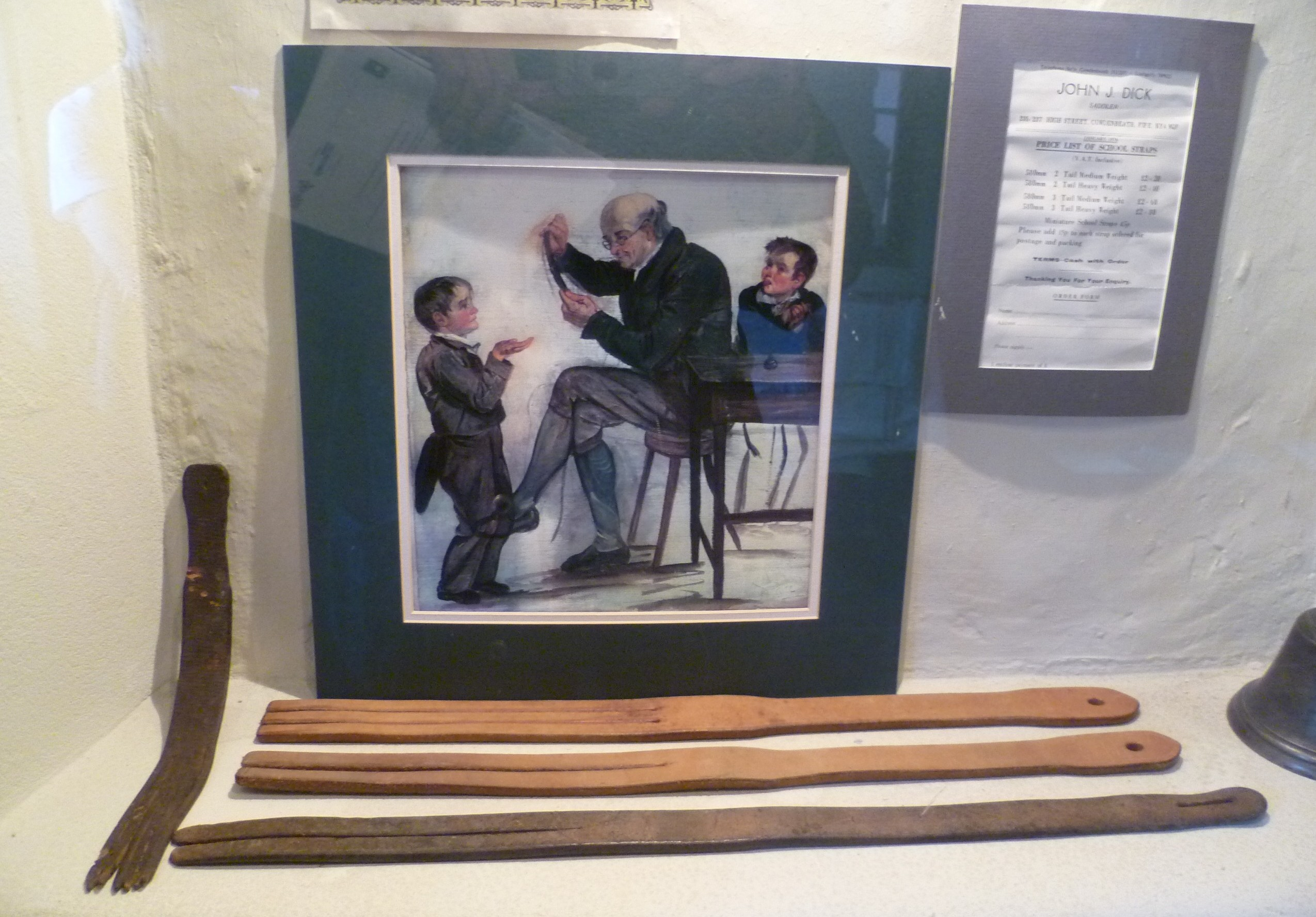
'The Dominie Functions' (1826) in an exhibit at Abbot House. (Note: The objects in front of the painting are tawses.)
