= Amelia Robertson Hill =

Scottish artist and sculptor

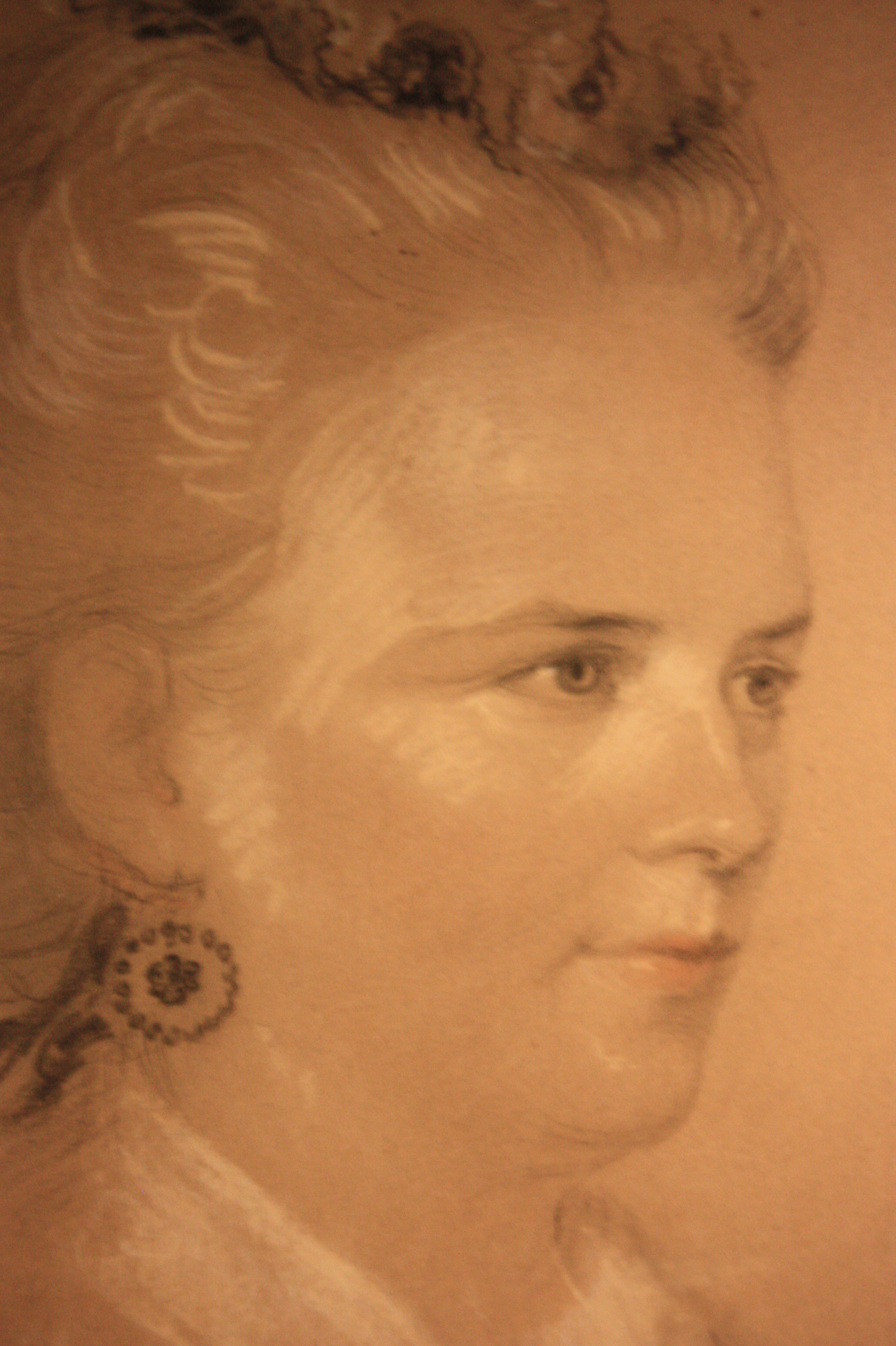
- Sketch by Alexander Blaikley 1853, SNPG
- Born: Emmilla McDermaid Paton; 15 January 1821; Dunfermline, Scotland
- Died: 5 July 1904 (aged 83); Edinburgh, Scotland
- Resting place: Dean Cemetery
- Occupations: Artist and sculptor
- Spouse: David Octavius Hill
- Relatives: Joseph Noel Paton (brother), Waller Hugh Paton (brother), Diarmid Noel Paton (nephew)

Amelia Robertson Hill (15 January 1821 – 5 July 1904), birth record Emmilia McDermaid Paton, was a prominent Scottish artist and sculptor throughout the 19th century and one of the few with public commissions. Her most noteworthy works are the statue of David Livingstone in Princes Street Gardens, Edinburgh and statue of Robert Burns in Dumfries. She was the main female contributor to the statues on the Scott Monument, contributing three figures.

== Life ==
Hill was born in Wooer's Alley, Dunfermline, the daughter of Catherine McDiarmid (d. 1853) and Joseph Neil Paton (1797–1874), a damask designer. Her sister Jemima, born on 11 November 1823. Her brothers were artists Joseph Noel Paton (1821–1901) and Waller Hugh Paton (1828–1895). She appears to have trained as a sculptor under William Brodie in Edinburgh.

In 1862 she married the pioneer photographer David Octavius Hill. She was his second wife. They lived in Edinburgh. His role as secretary of the Royal Scottish Academy played a part in this. In 1861 they moved to George Square, and in 1863 to Calton Stairs. In 1868 they set up home at Rock House, on the south-west corner of Calton Hill near the southern entrance steps to the hill. Although they are famously connected with this address they lived here only two years. He died in 1870 and Amelia moved out of the house, to Newington Lodge. She placed a bronze bust of his likeness, sculpted by her own hands, on his grave.

The 1891 census describes Hill as "sculptor, retired" but she exhibited at the Royal Scottish Academy until 1902, aged 82. She died at her house, Newington Lodge, 38 Mayfield Terrace on 5 July 1904 aged 83. She was buried next to her husband in Dean Cemetery, beneath her own sculpture of 34 years earlier.

== Bicentenary ==
A walking tour of her Edinburgh works was instigated as 'The Amelia Tour' in her bicentenary year, 2021.

== Principal works ==
Selected works

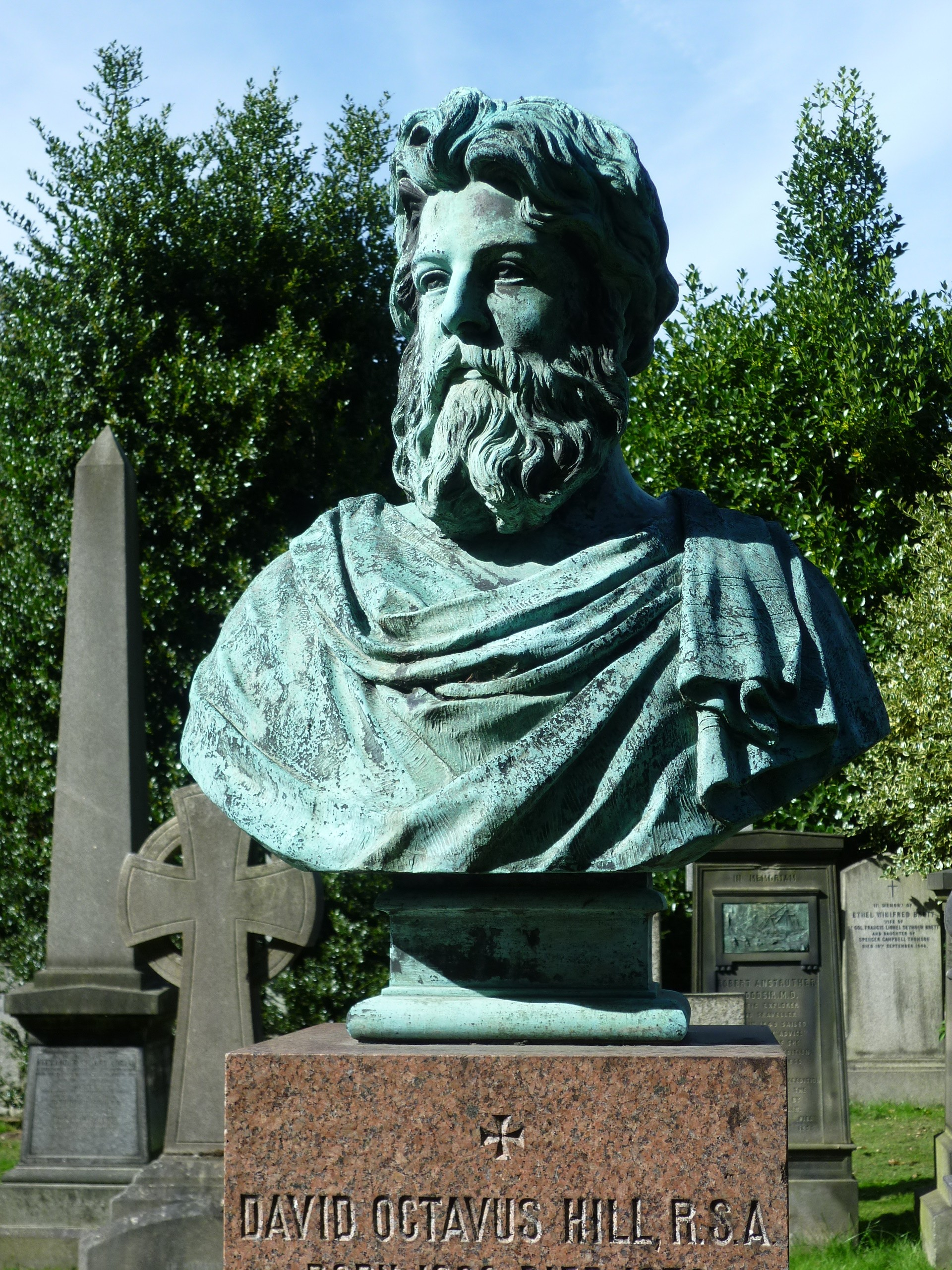
David Octavius Hill on the couple's grave in Dean Cemetery

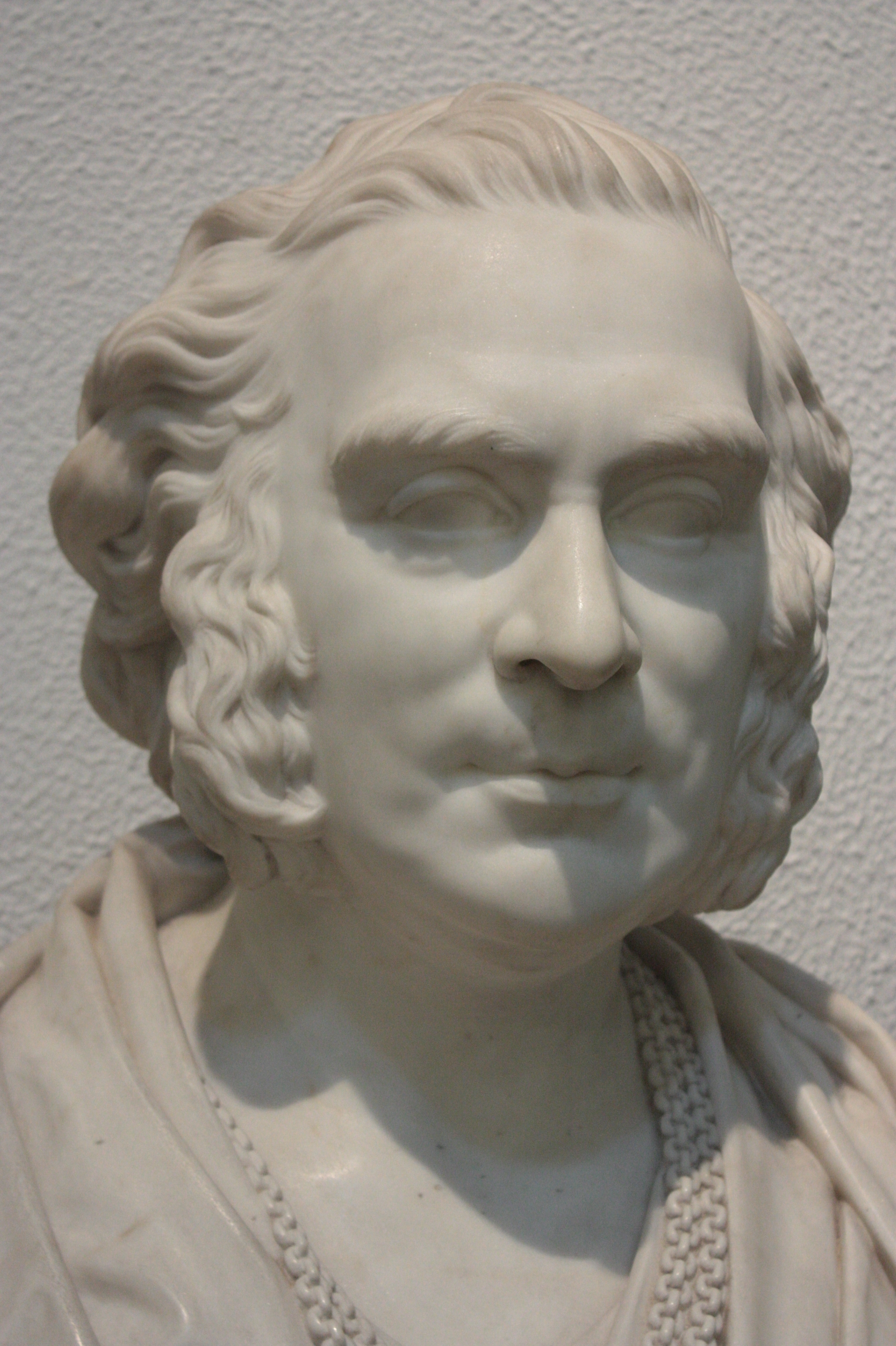
Sir George Harvey

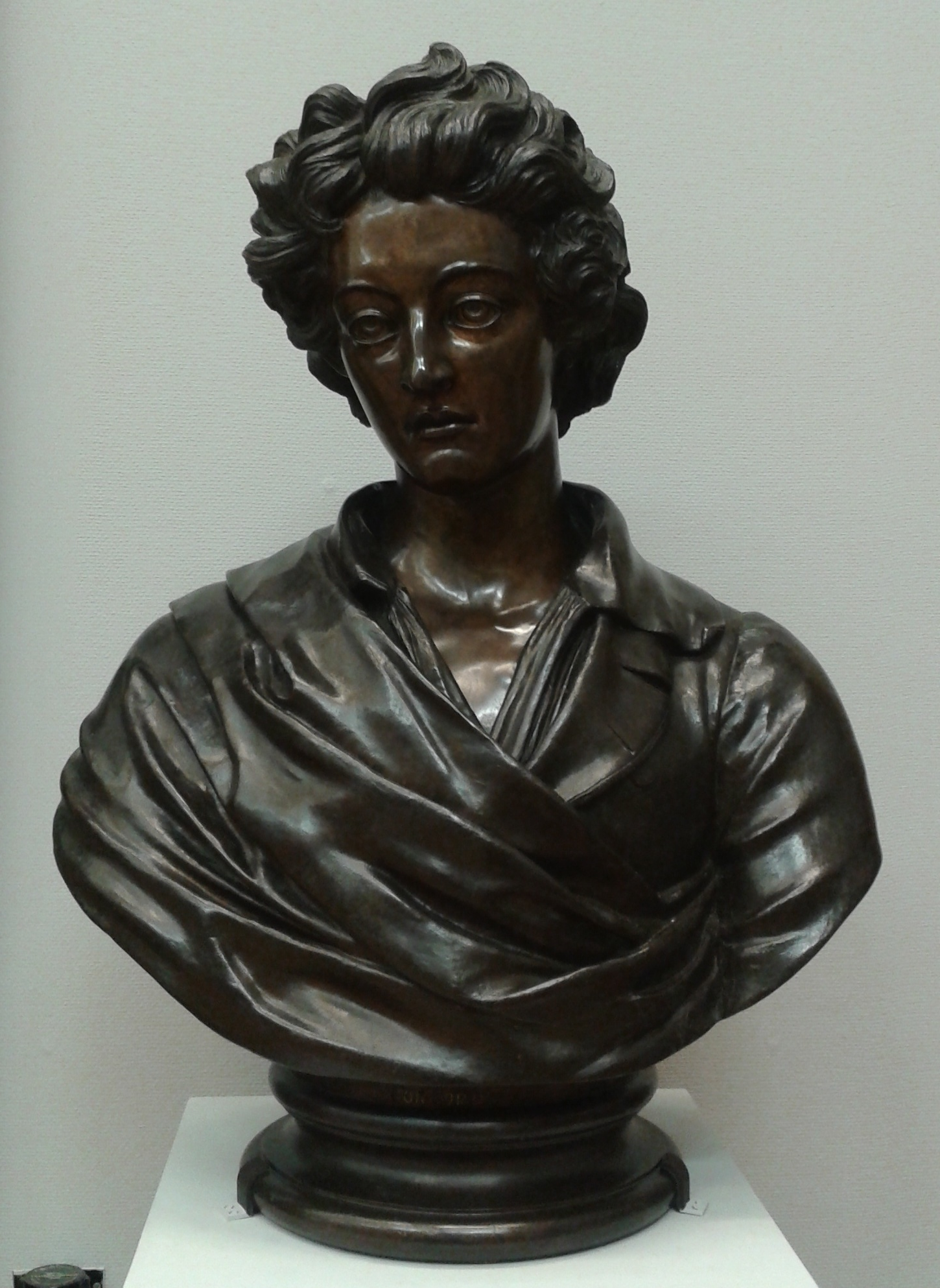
Percy Shelley (Tate Britain)

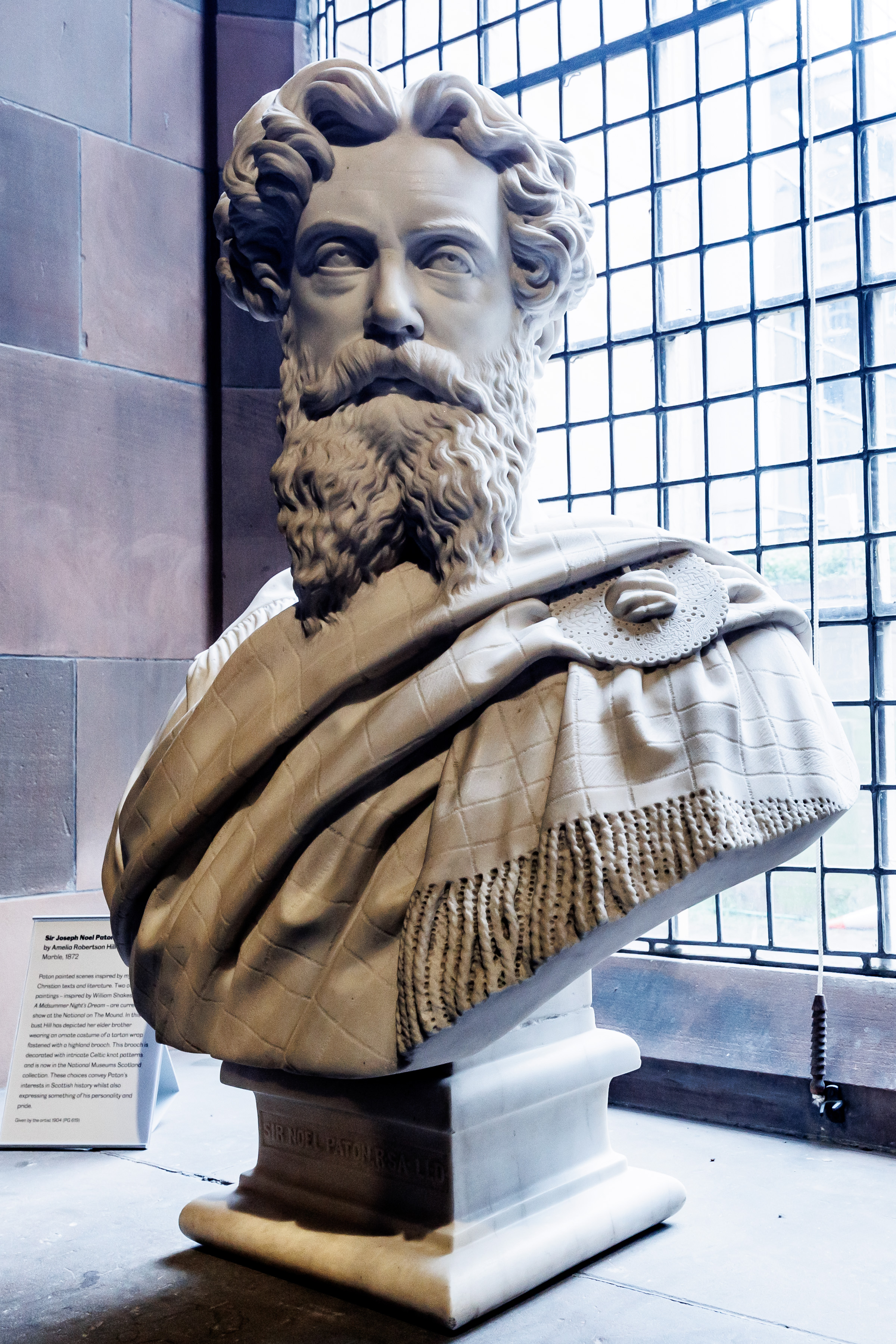
Bust of her brother, Scottish artist Joseph Noel Paton (SNPG)

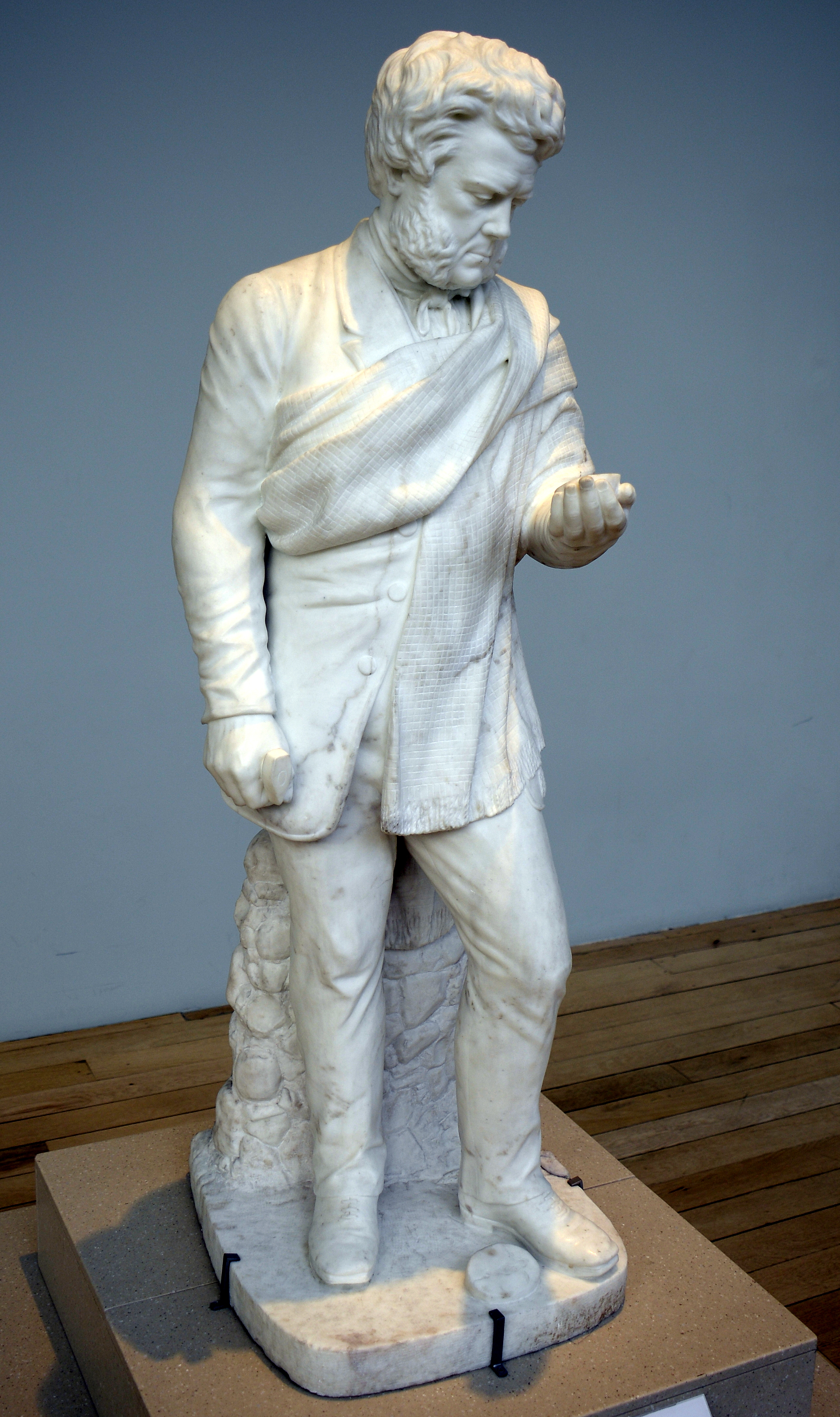
Hugh Miller (SNPG)

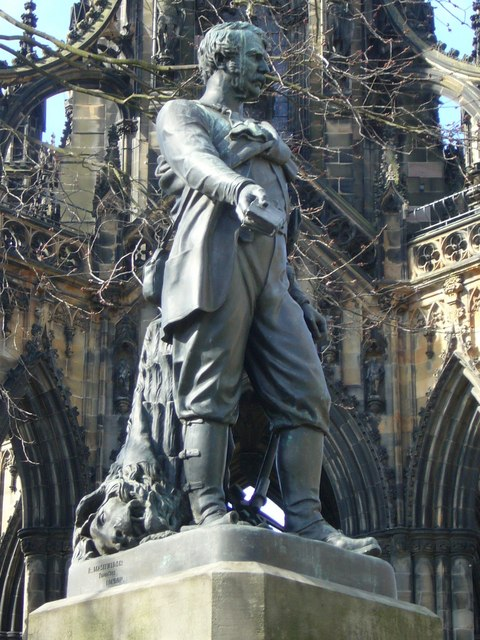
David Livingstone, Princes Street Gardens, Edinburgh

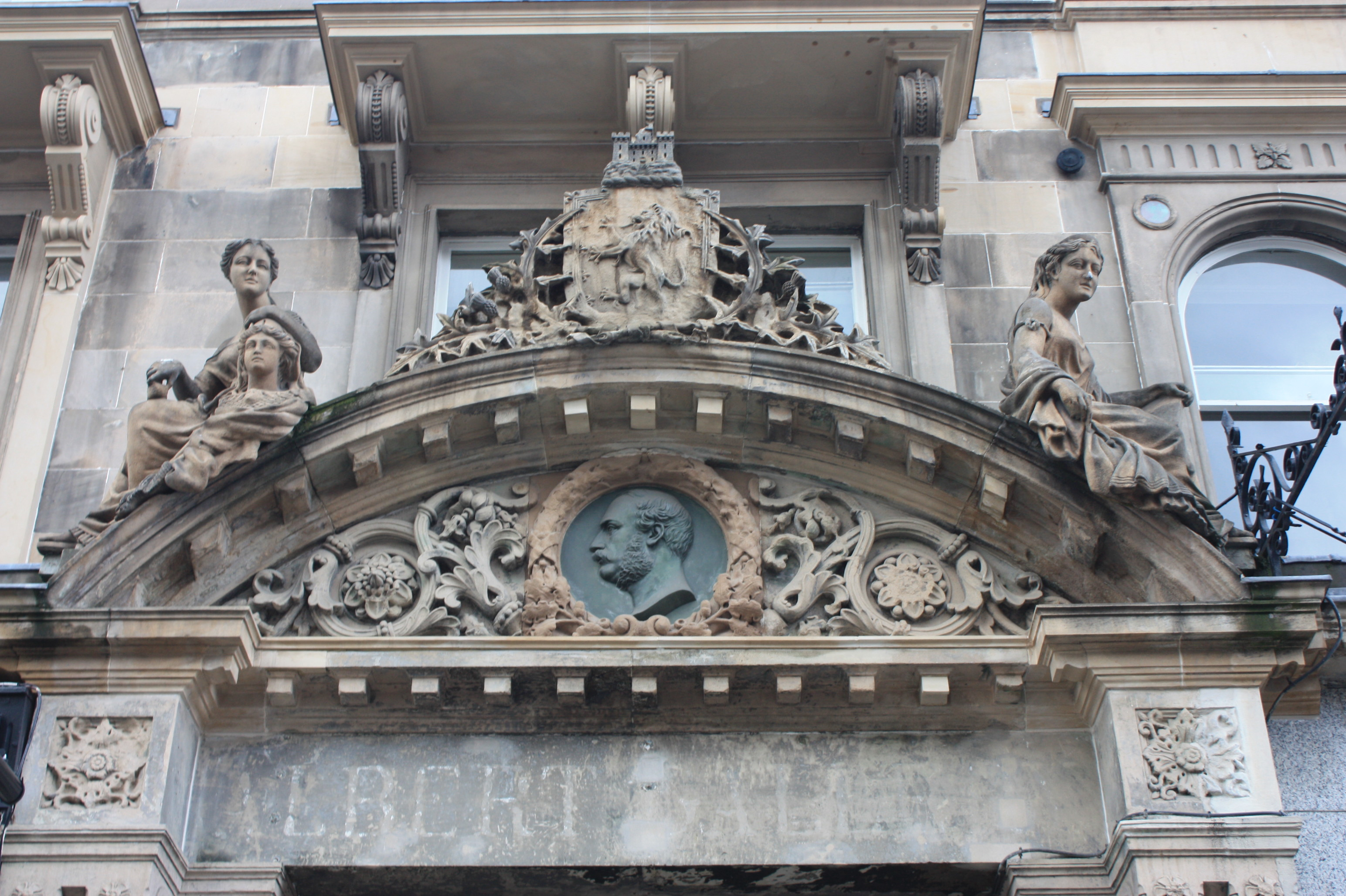
Carving on the Albert Buildings, Shadwick Place, Edinburgh

- Bust of John Fergus MP, Kirkcaldy Town Hall (1861)
- Marble bust of Mary Louise, Countess of Elgin, Lord Elgin Hotel, Ottawa (1863)
- Marble busts of Rev. Robert Smith Candlish in his role as principal of New College, one of the leaders of the Scottish Disruption, held by the University of Edinburgh (1864 and 1865)
- Marble bust of Rev. Horatius Bonar, hymn-writer (1865)
- James Wemyss of Wemyss MP, Fife County Hall (1866)
- Marble bust of Thomas Carlyle, National Trust of Scotland collection (1866)
- Marble bust of David Livingstone (1866)
- Bust of Edward Cazalet (1866)
- Bust of her husband, David Octavius Hill (1867)
- Marble bust of Sir George Harvey (1867)
- Marble bust of David Brewster, scientist (1867)
- Three stone figures for the Scott Monument on Princes Street, Edinburgh (1870) (Magnus Troil and Minna Troil of The Pirate (novel) and Richard the Lionheart)
- Pet Marjorie, the child author (1870)
- Marble bust of her brother, Joseph Noel Paton, Scottish National Portrait Gallery (1872)
- Bust of Sir James Young Simpson (1872)
- Painting, "Ludlow Castle, evening" (1873)
- Very prominent statue to David Livingstone on Princes Street in Edinburgh (1875) erected by public subscription.
- Memorial to Regent Murray in Linlithgow, marking the place of his assassination (1876)
- Figures of "Painting" and "Poetry" flanking the shoulders of the ornate entrance to the Albert Buildings, 22–30 Shandwick Place, Edinburgh (1877)
- Statue of Robert Burns, Church Place, Dumfries (1881)
- Bust of Percy Bysshe Shelley, exhibited RSA (1882)

== Bibliography ==
- Oxford Dictionary of National Biography: Hill, Oxford University Press
- Dictionary of Scottish Art and Architecture, 2004
