= Diarmid Noel Paton =

Scottish physician and academic (1859-1928)

Diarmid Noël Paton FRCPE, FRS, FRSE
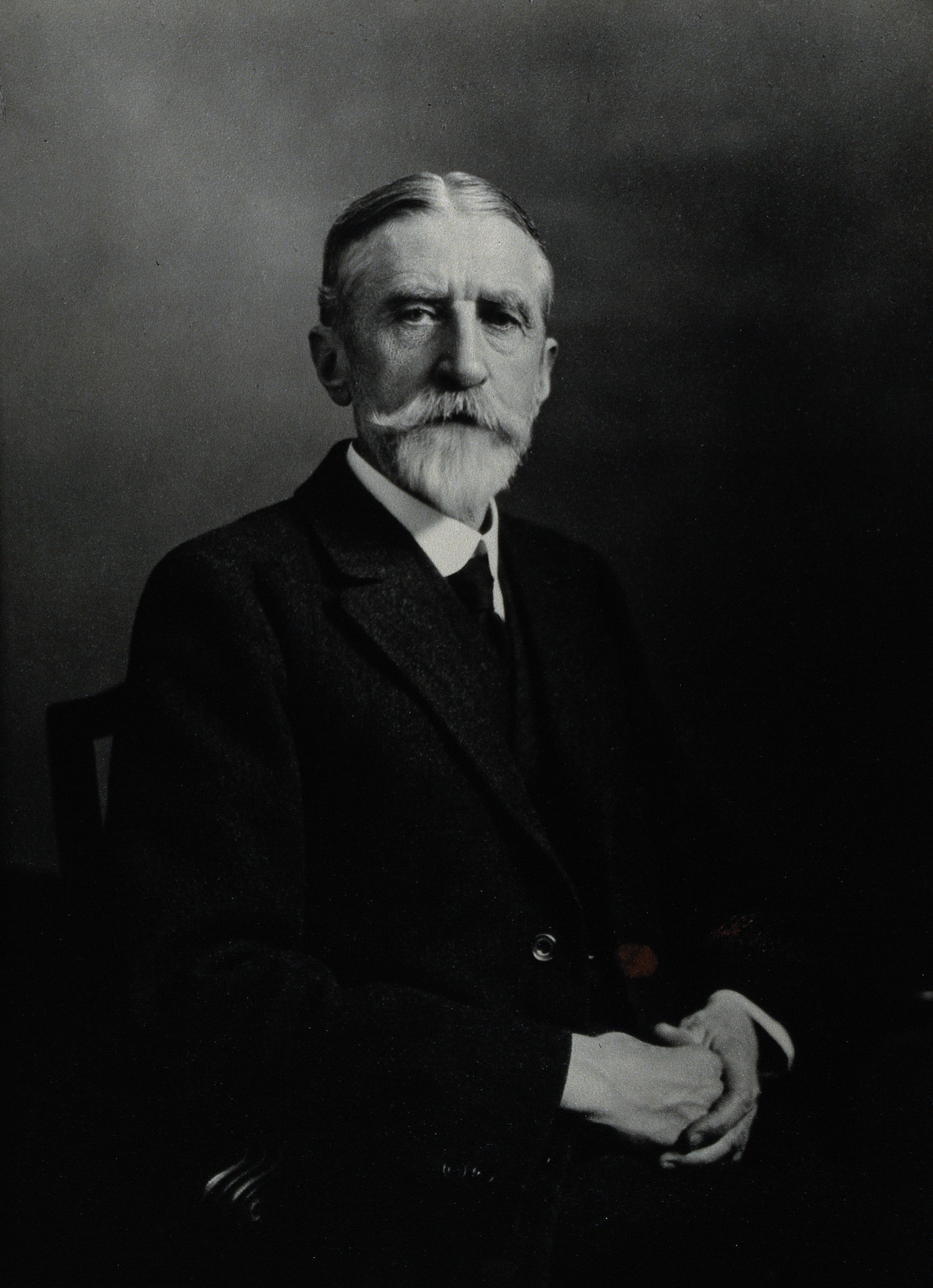
- Born: 19 March 1859; Edinburgh, Scotland
- Died: 30 September 1928 (aged 69); Stobo, Scotland
- Occupations: Physician, Regius Professor of Physiology
- Employer: University of Glasgow
- Relatives: Joseph Noel Paton (father), Amelia Robertson Hill (aunt), Waller Hugh Paton (uncle)

Diarmid Noël Paton (19 March 1859 – 30 September 1928), known as Noël Paton, was a Scottish physician and academic. From 1906 to 1928, he was the Regius Professor of Physiology at the University of Glasgow.

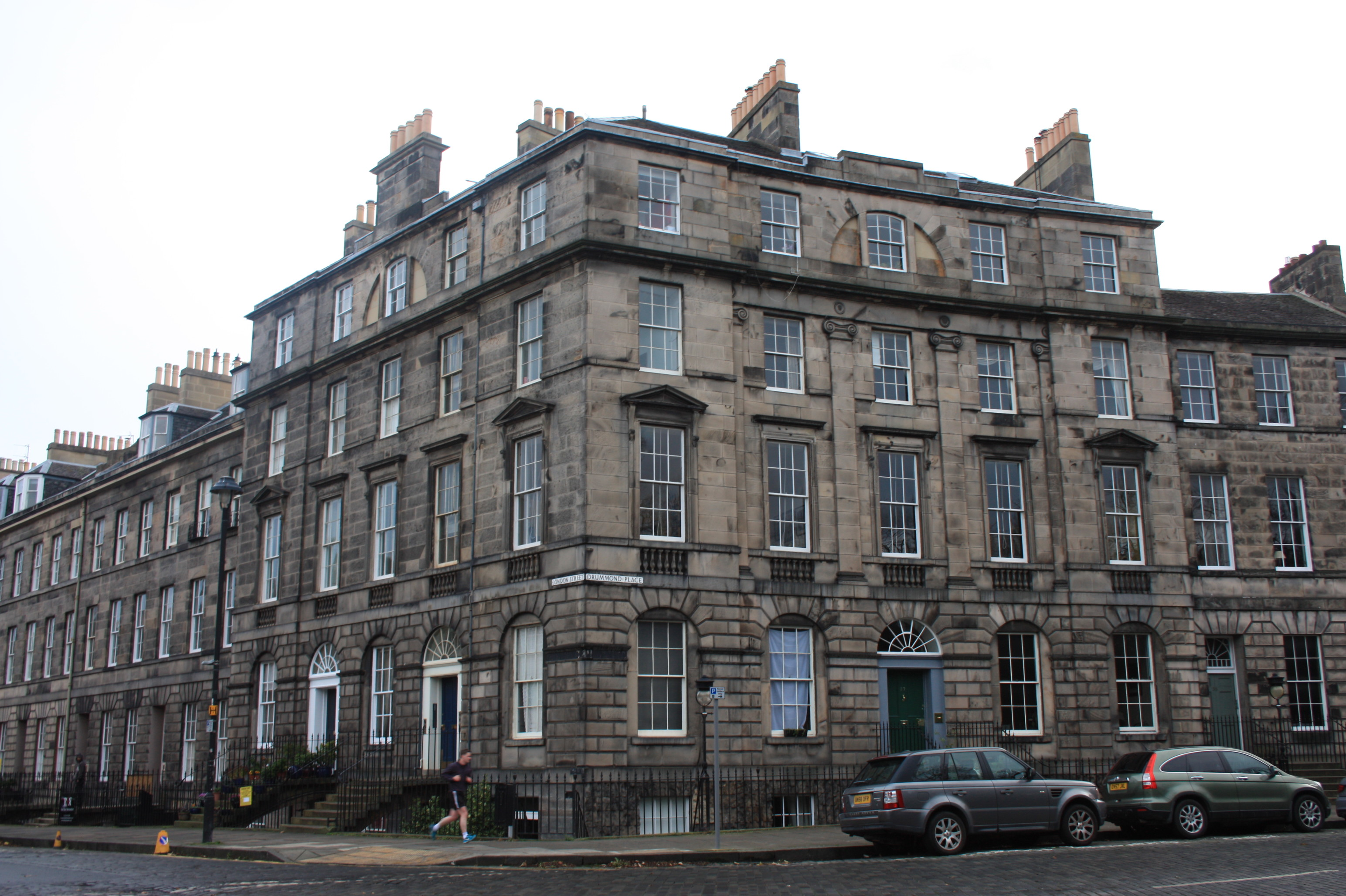
37 Drummond Place, Edinburgh

== Personal life and education ==
Paton was born at 37 Drummond Place in Edinburgh's New Town, the son of Sir Joseph Noel Paton and his wife, Margaret Gourlay Ferrier. His father worked as an artist. He was educated at Edinburgh Academy, and the University of Edinburgh where he graduated with a BSc in 1880, and MB, CM with first-class honours in 1882.

In 1898 he married Agatha (Agate) Henrietta Balfour. They were parents to Donald Noel Paton and Olivia Campbell Paton.

He died while walking along the banks of the River Tweed near his home at Stobo in the Scottish Borders on 30 September 1928.

== Career ==
After a short period of study in Europe, Paton took up positions at Edinburgh Royal Infirmary and later the Royal Hospital for Sick Children. He received a fellowship in 1883 to work in the University of Edinburgh's physiological department with Professor William Rutherford. In 1886 he became a lecturer in physiology at Surgeons' Hall, and in the same year was elected a Fellow of the Royal Society of Edinburgh in 1886. His proposers were William Rutherford, Andrew Douglas Maclagan, Sir William Turner and Peter Guthrie Tait. In 1889, he was appointed Director of the research laboratory of the Royal College of Physicians of Edinburgh and devoted his time increasingly to research and teaching. During this time he taught at the Edinburgh Extramural School of Medicine, giving lectures in physiology at Surgeons' Hall.

He was appointed to the Regius Chair of Physiology at the University of Glasgow in 1906, a position he held until his retirement in 1928.

He was elected a Fellow of the Royal Society in 1914, and served as its Vice President from 1918 to 1921. In 1921 he was elected a member of the Aesculapian Club.

His early research in Edinburgh had centred on diabetes, rickets and the physiology of nutrition. In Glasgow he expanded on these, researching the physiology and pathology of the Parathyroid glands. His interest in nutrition continued. In Glasgow at that time deprivation was common and Paton investigated the relationship between poverty, nutrition, and growth.
