= The Quarrel of Oberon and Titania =

1849 painting by Sir Joseph Noel Paton

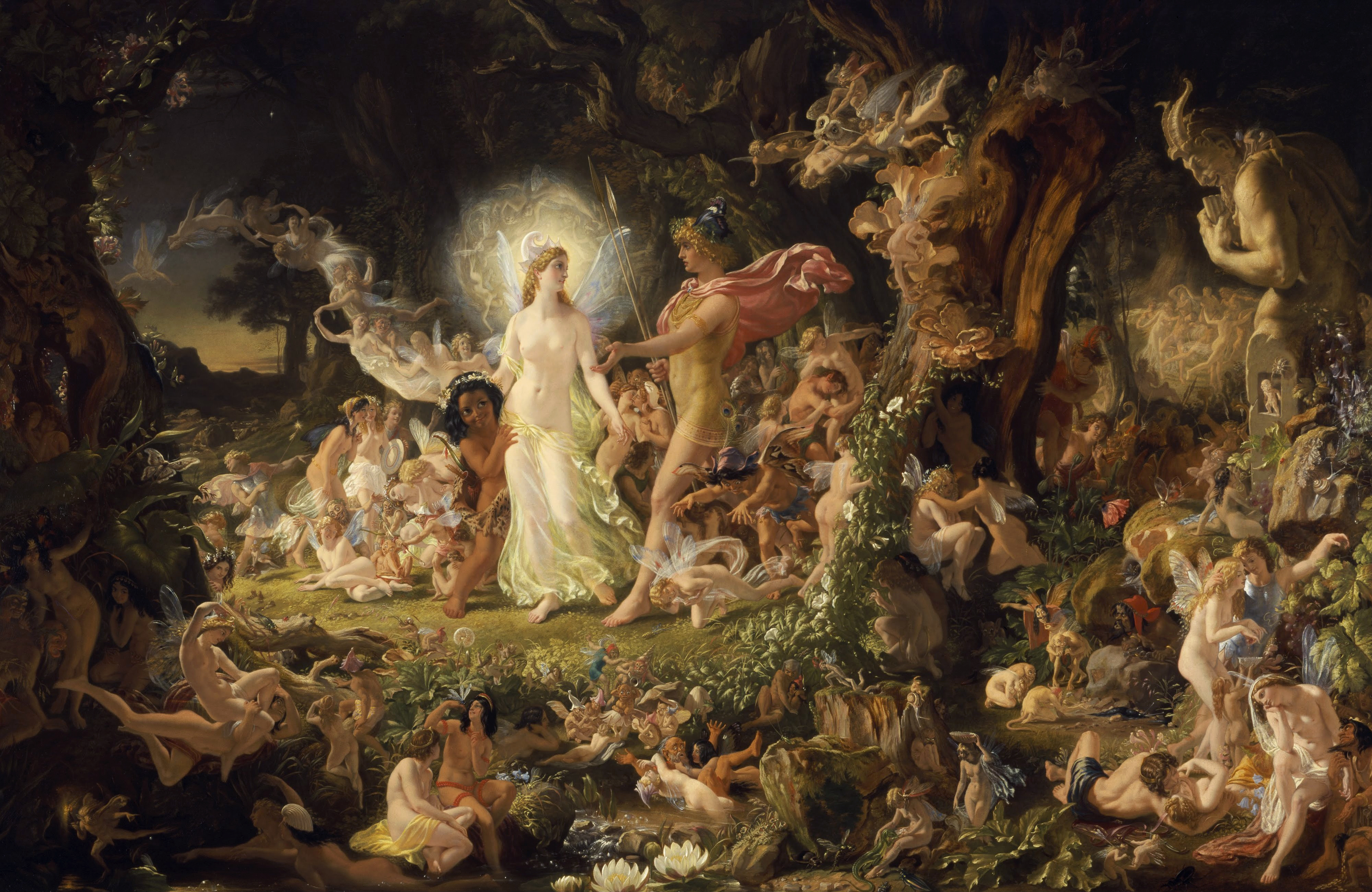
- Artist: Sir Joseph Noel Paton
- Year: 1849
- Medium: Oil on canvas
- Dimensions: 99 cm × 152 cm (39 in × 60 in)
- Location: Scottish National Gallery, Edinburgh

The Quarrel of Oberon and Titania is an oil on canvas painting by the Scottish artist Sir Joseph Noel Paton. Painted in 1849, it depicts the scene from William Shakespeare's comedy play A Midsummer Night's Dream, when the fairy queen Titania and fairy king Oberon quarrel; Oberon was considered the King of the fairies in medieval and Renaissance literature. When exhibited in Edinburgh during 1850, it was declared as the "painting of the season". It was acquired by the National Gallery of Scotland in 1897, having initially been bought by the Royal Association for Promoting the Fine Arts in Scotland during 1850. An earlier version of this painting was Paton's diploma picture, which was submitted to the Royal Scottish Academy in 1846; they paid £700 for it.

== Description ==
The overall dimensions of the oil on canvas painting are 99 by 152 centimetres (39 by 60 in). Based on William Shakespeare's comedy play A Midsummer Night's Dream, it depicts a scene in which the fairy queen Titania and fairy king Oberon quarrel with each other. Oberon was considered the King of the fairies in medieval and Renaissance literature. The scene depicts Act II, scene i, put into an enchanting imaginary landscape when Oberon is arguing with Titania, just as nightfall descends. The setting is the couple's woodland home outside Athens and they are surrounded by a group of fairies. According to Lewis Carroll, the author of the 1865 novel Alice's Adventures in Wonderland, 165 fairies are in the painting.

The subject of the couple's argument is the changeling boy, who is hiding behind Titania. A lily pond is at the front of the painting and the woodland setting is made up from leaves, flowers and aged twisted trees. Titania's head is encircled by a group of fairies forming a bright crown of light. A statue of Pan with a set of pipes is placed to the right of the picture with several couples in a state of undress positioned beneath it. Goblins mingle with elves and imps that all cavort among the nude fairies; some other little, ugly figures are scattered throughout together with moths, beetles, spiders and snails.

Paton's earlier work in 1847, The Reconciliation of Oberon and Titania, was considered by Paton to be "related yet self-contained".

== Exhibitions and provenance ==
First exhibited at the Royal Scottish Academy in 1850, where it was declared to be the "painting of the season", the picture was purchased by the Royal Association for Promoting the Fine Arts in Scotland during that year. The Quarrel was later displayed at the Paris Exhibition in 1855, being listed as "Representative of British Art". It passed to the ownership of the National Gallery of Scotland in 1897. An earlier study of this painting was completed in 1846 and featured as Paton's diploma picture at the Royal Scottish Academy that year. The Academy purchased the earlier work for £700.

According to Richard Schindler, Associate Professor of Art at Allegheny College, the piece bears influences from the works of Henry Fuseli, an opinion shared by Carole Silver, a professor with a particular interest in the 19th-century fascination with fairies. Christopher Wood, an expert in Victorian art, described Paton's work as being "some of the most remarkable fairy pictures".

== See also ==
- Hermia and Lysander
- Scene from A Midsummer Night's Dream
