= Waller Hugh Paton =

Scottish landscape artist

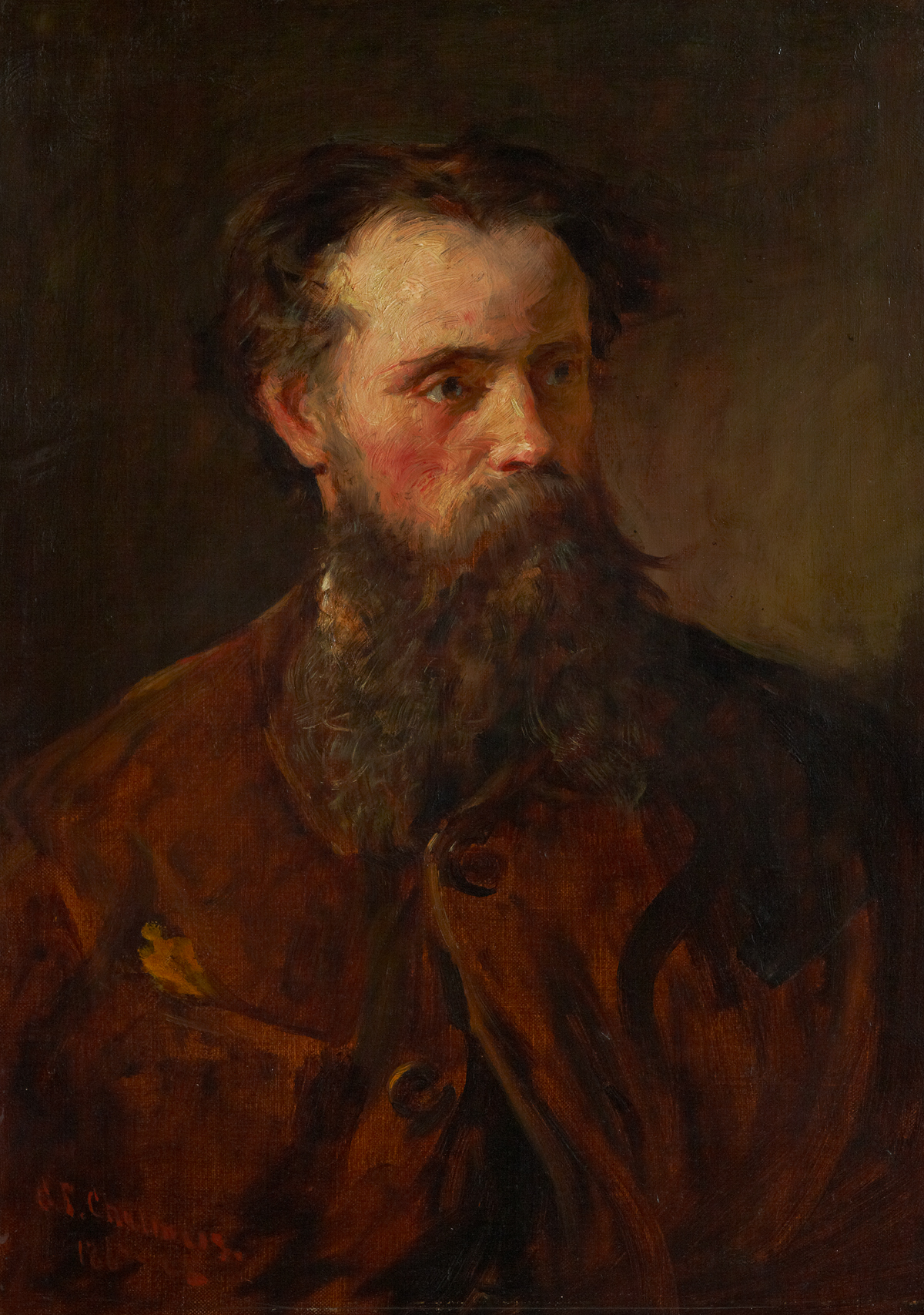
Waller Hugh Paton by George Paul Chalmers

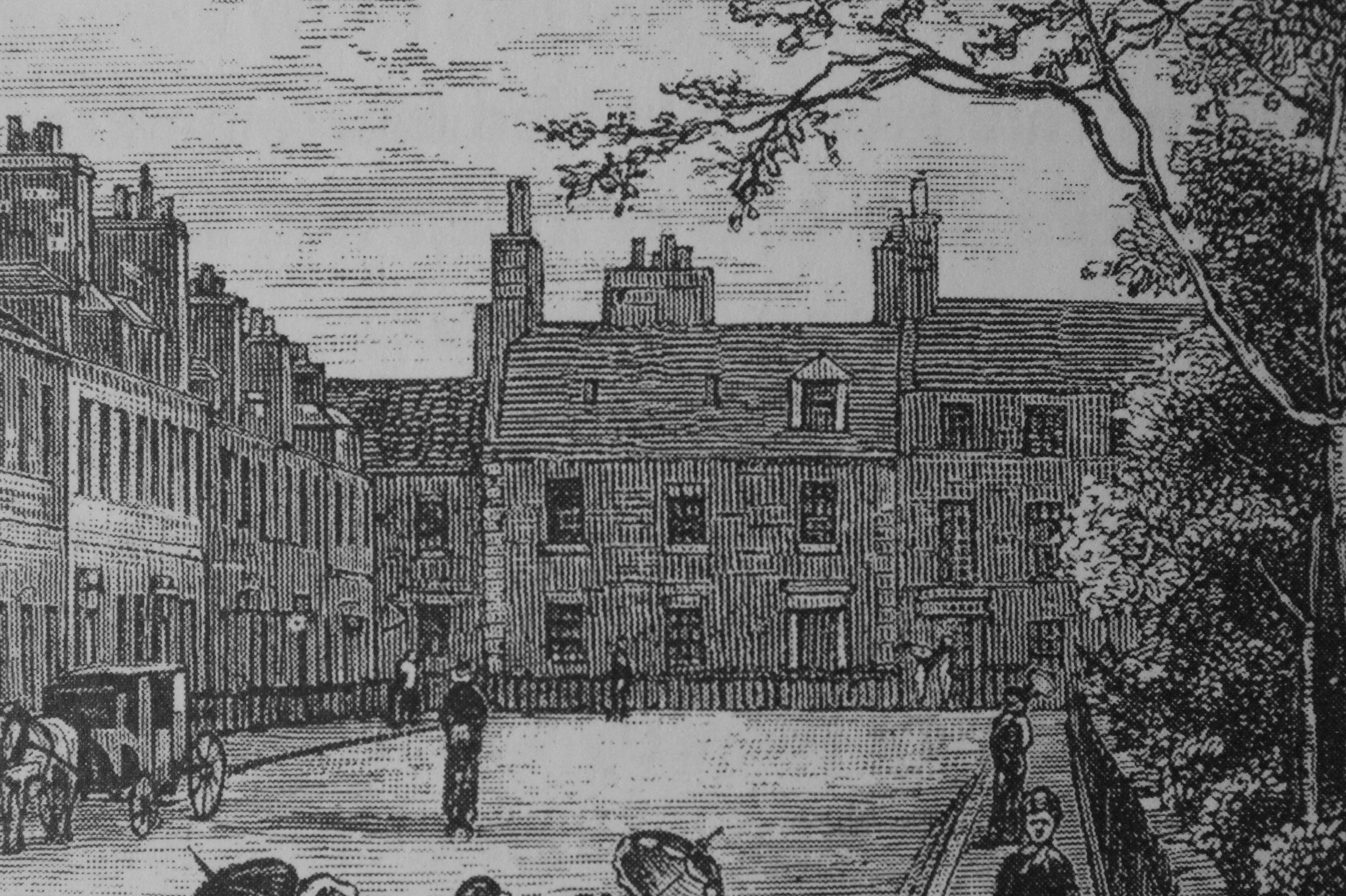
14 George Square in Edinburgh

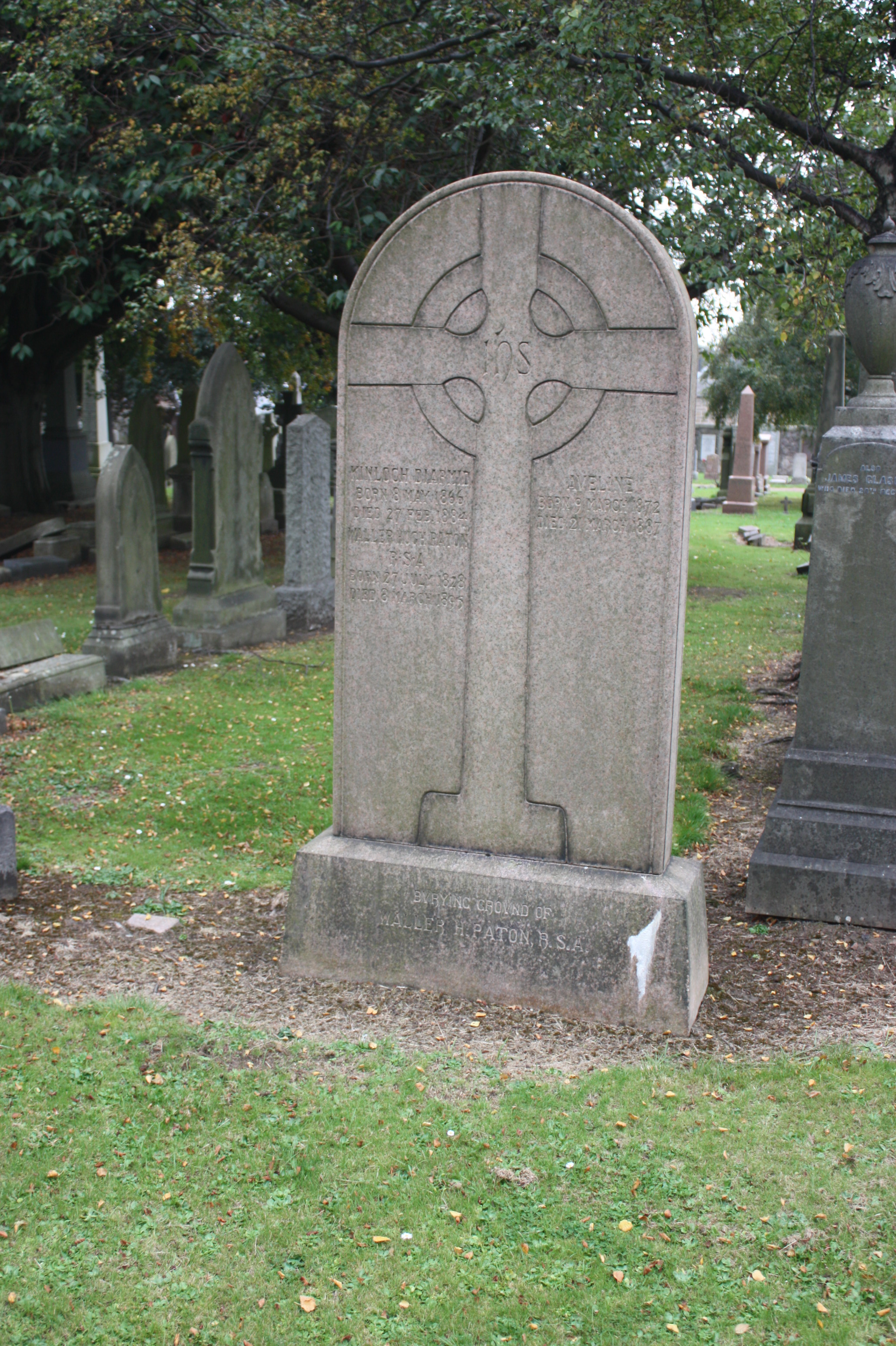
The grave of Waller Hugh Paton, Grange Cemetery, Edinburgh

Waller Hugh Paton RSA RSW (27 July 1828 – 8 March 1895) was a Scottish landscape artist in the second half of the 19th century.

== Early life ==
Paton was born in Wooer's Alley, Dunfermline, the son of Joseph Neil Paton (1797–1874), a damask designer, and Catherine McDiarmid. His brother and sister, Joseph Noel Paton and Amelia Robertson Hill (wife of David Octavius Hill), were also artists.

== Career ==
In his teens, Paton worked with his father as a damask designer. From age twenty he trained under the mid-19th century artist John Houston (1802–1884) RSA. He was elected an associate of the Royal Scottish Academy (ARSA) in 1857 and became a full member (RSA) in 1865. In 1878 he became a member of the Royal Society of Watercolourists (RSW).

In 1858 he and his brother illustrated William Edmondstoune Aytoun's book "Lays of the Scottish Cavaliers", published in 1863.

Paton was one of the few of his generation to work "en plain air", the fashion then being to complete landscapes in the comfort of a studio. He enjoyed depicting the countrysides of Perthshire, Aberdeenshire, and especially the Isle of Arran. His work is typified by rich purple sunsets.

== Personal life ==
From 1859, Paton lived in Edinburgh, initially staying with his brother Joseph in his large Georgian townhouse at 37 Drummond Place in the New Town.

In 1861 and 1868, he toured the Continent with his friend Donald MacKenzie Wallace and his brother Joseph.

In 1862 he married Margaret Kinloch of Maryculter near Aberdeen. They had four sons and three daughters.

In 1875, he moved to 14 George Square, Edinburgh. The house stood on the north side of the square, facing along the line of houses on the west side. It was demolished in the 20th century.

His son Waller Hubert Paton (1863–1940) was a sculptor.

== Death ==
Paton died at his home, 14 George Square, Edinburgh, on 8 March 1895 from pleurisy, which had plagued him for the last 10 years of his life. He is buried in Grange Cemetery in southern Edinburgh.

== Principal works ==
- "The Antique Room, Wooer's Alley, by Firelight" (1848)
- "Glen Massen", Royal Scottish Academy (1851)
- "Loch Lomond", Government Art Collection (1858)
- "Winter Daybreak", McLean Museum and Art Gallery, Inverclyde (1864)
- "Lamlash Bay, Isle of Arran", Royal Scottish Academy (1865)
- "Entrance to the Cuiraing, Skye", National Gallery of Scotland (1873)
- "The Border Keep", Welsh National Museum, Cardiff (1875)
- "Cobbles at Sundown, Arrochar", Folkestone Library
- "Craigmillar Castle", The Fleming Collection
- "Outlet at Loch Achray, Perthshire", Fyvie Castle (NTS)
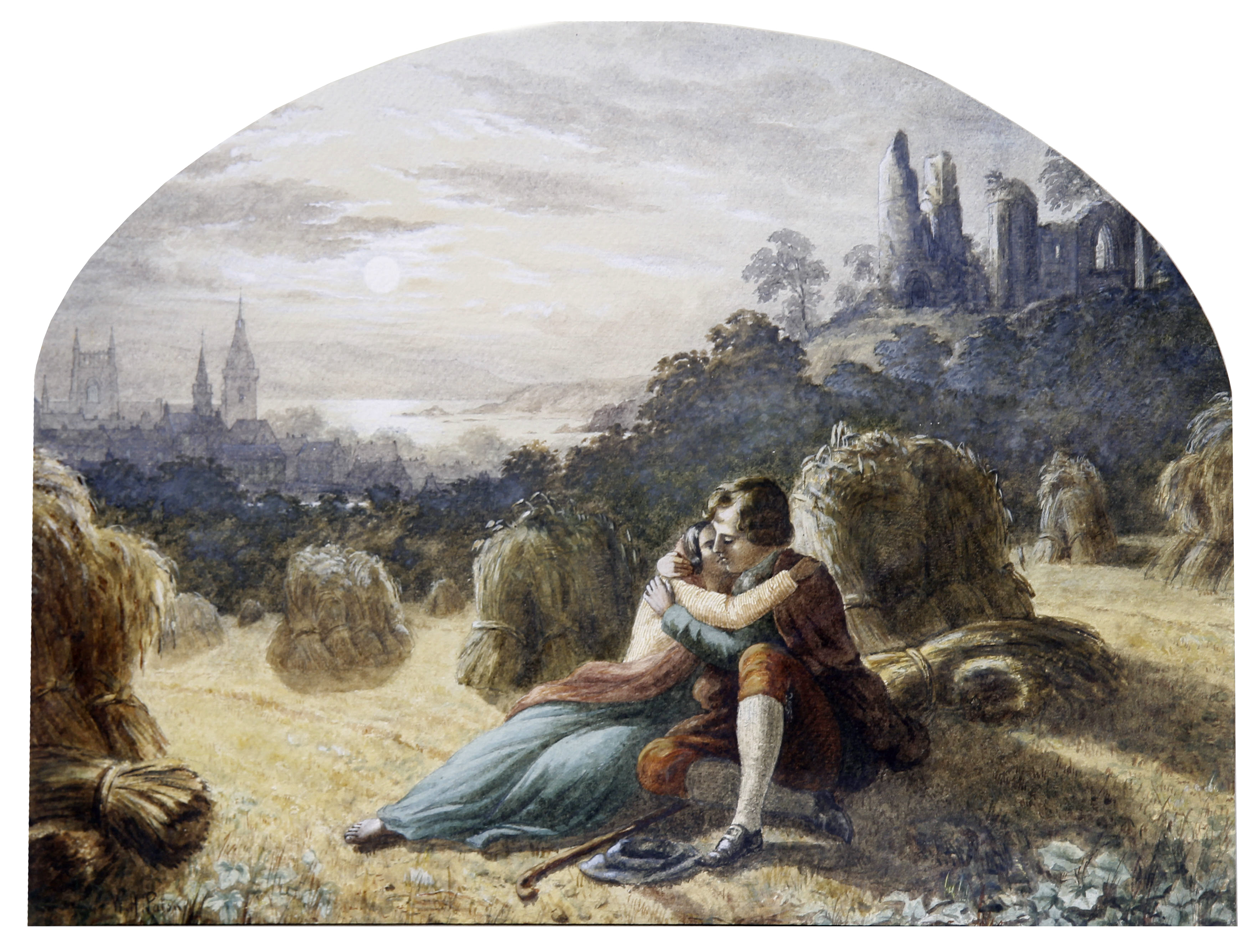
Lovers in a cornfield

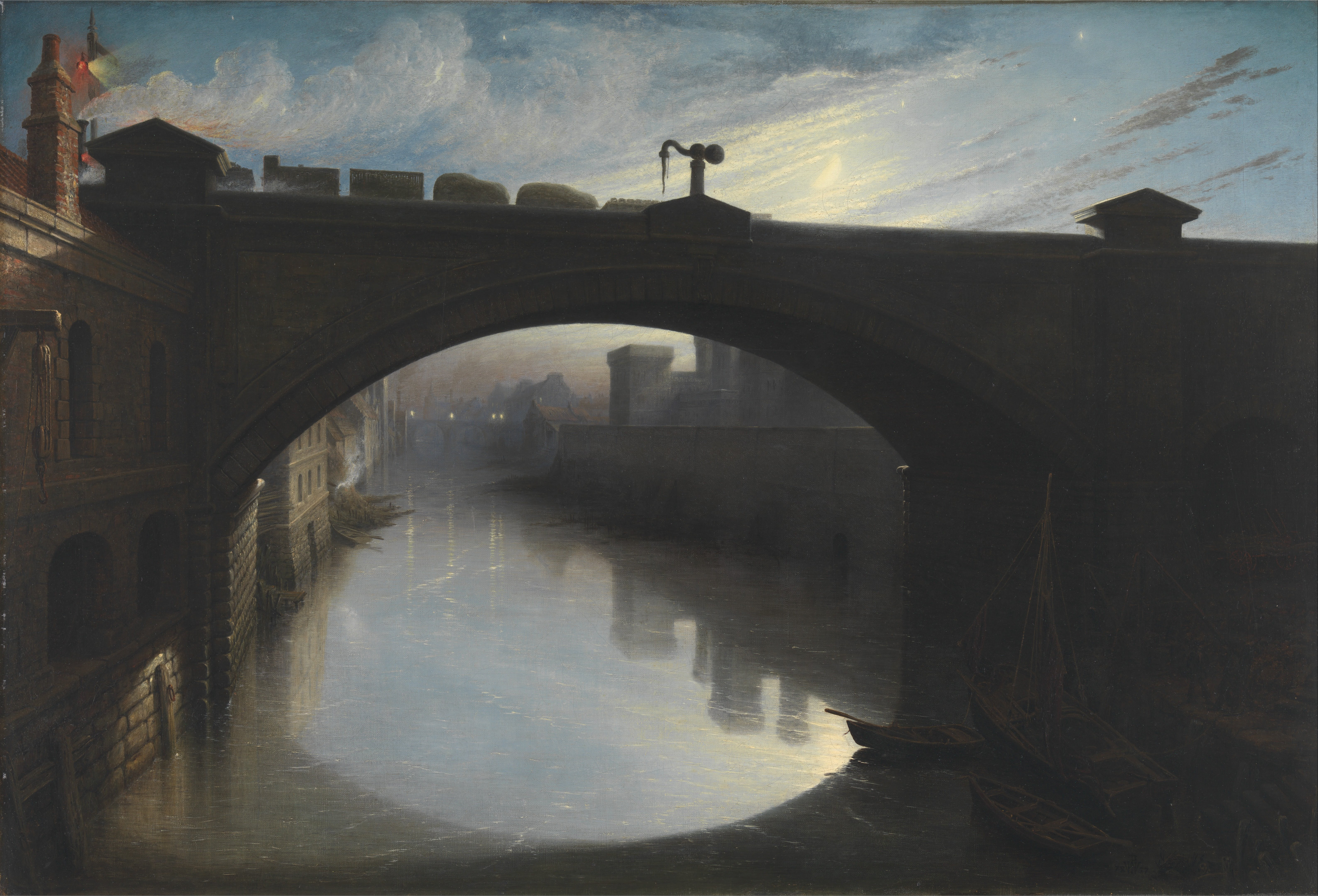
Railway Bridge over the River Cart, Paisley

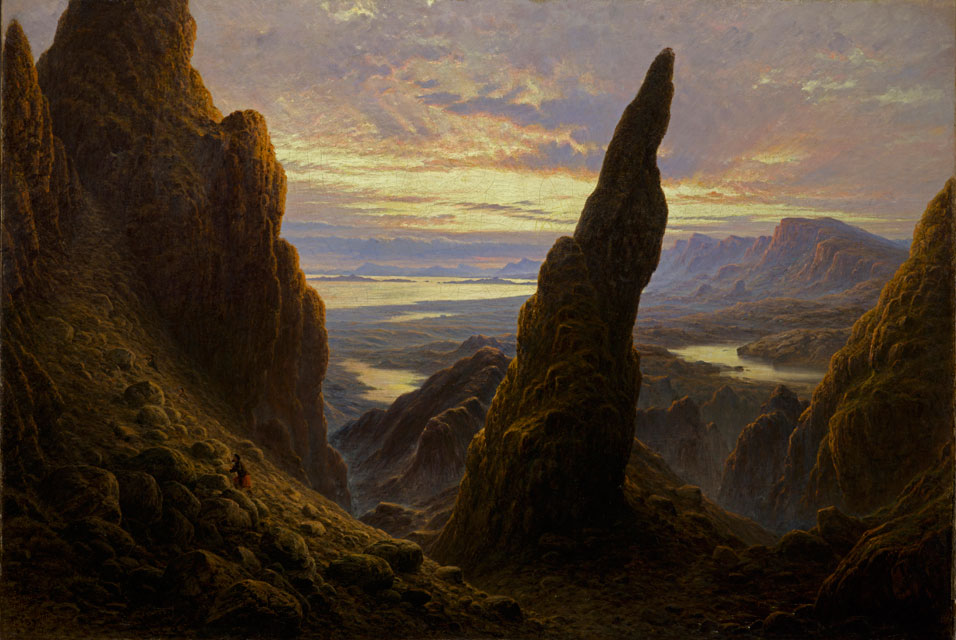
Entrance to the Cuiraing, Skye

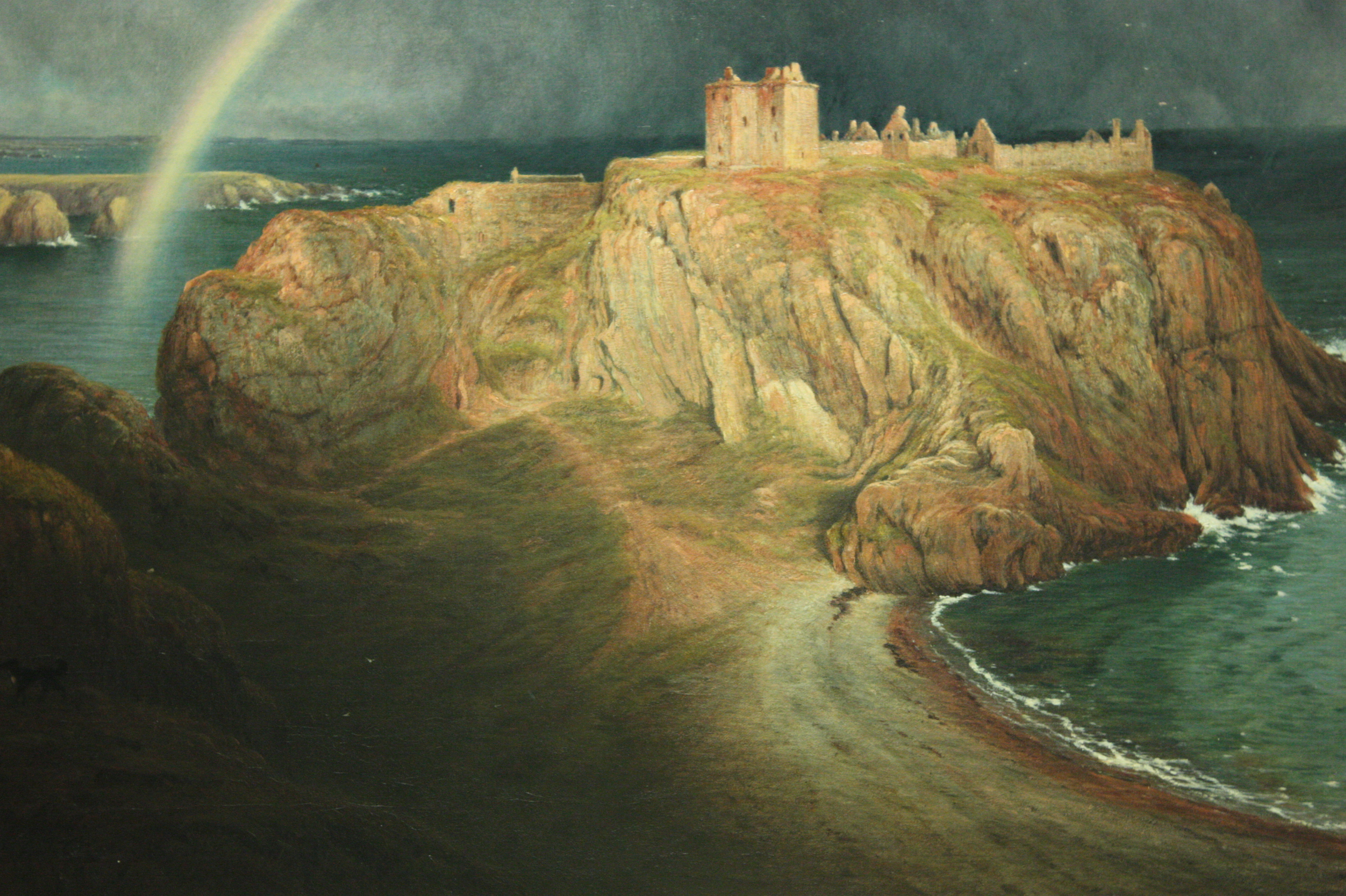
Dunnottar Castle by Waller Hugh Paton, 1867
