= Joseph Noel Paton =

Scottish artist (1821–1901)

Sir Joseph Noel Paton FRSA, LLD
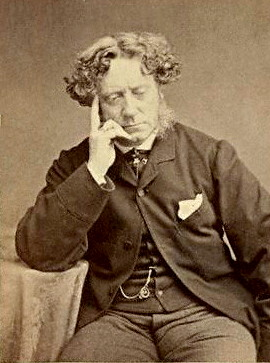
- Paton in 1866
- Born: 13 December 1821; Dunfermline, Scotland
- Died: 26 December 1901 (aged 80); Edinburgh, Scotland
- Education: Dunfermline Art Academy
- Known for: Artist, illustrator and sculptor
- Spouse: Margaret Gourlay Ferrier
- Relatives: Amelia Robertson Hill (sister), Waller Hugh Paton (brother), Diarmid Noel Paton (son)

Sir Joseph Noel Paton FRSA (13 December 1821 – 26 December 1901) was a Scottish artist, illustrator and sculptor. He was also a poet and had an interest in, and knowledge of, Scottish folklore and Celtic legends.

== Early life ==
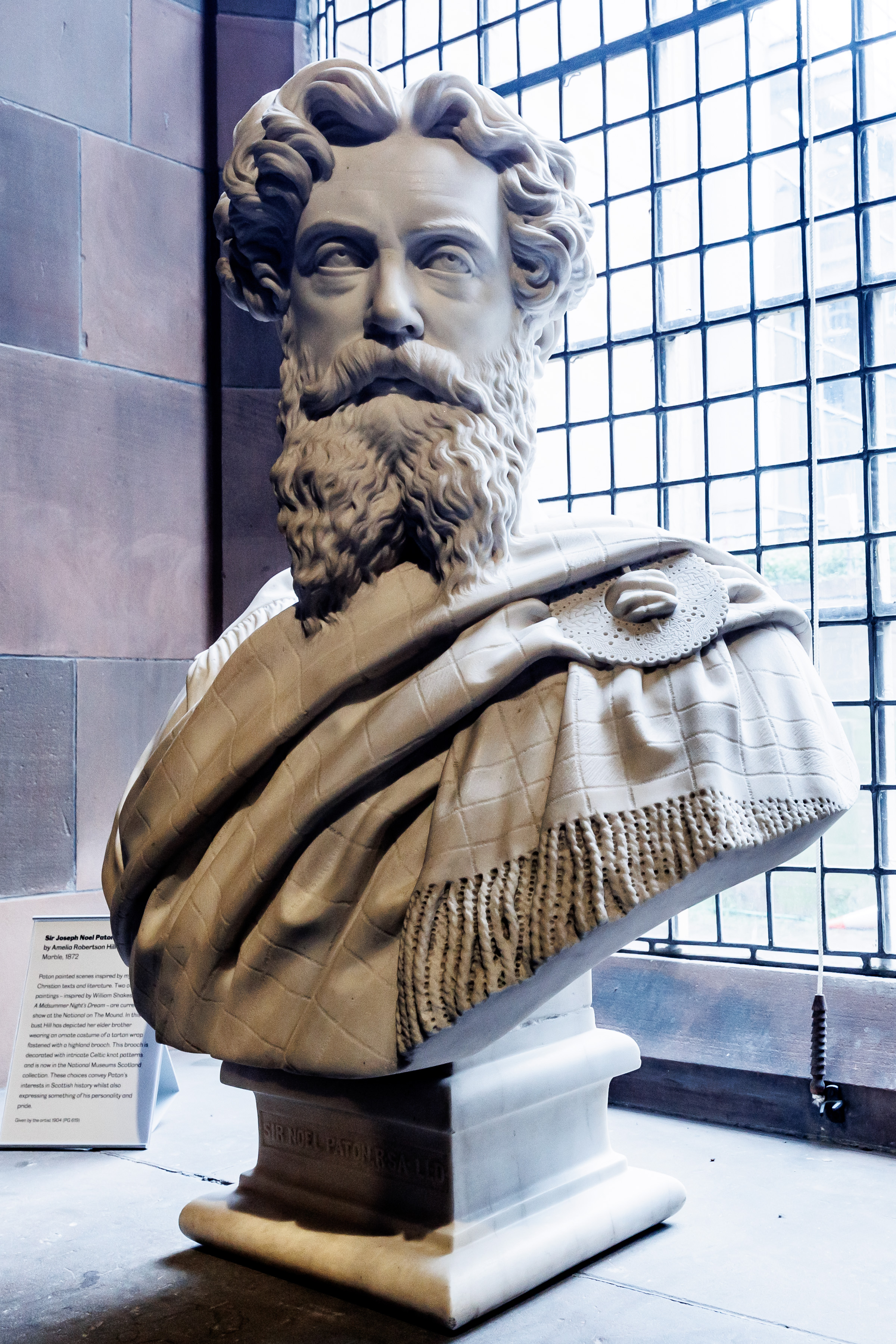
Joseph Noel Paton by his sister Amelia Robertson Hill 1872

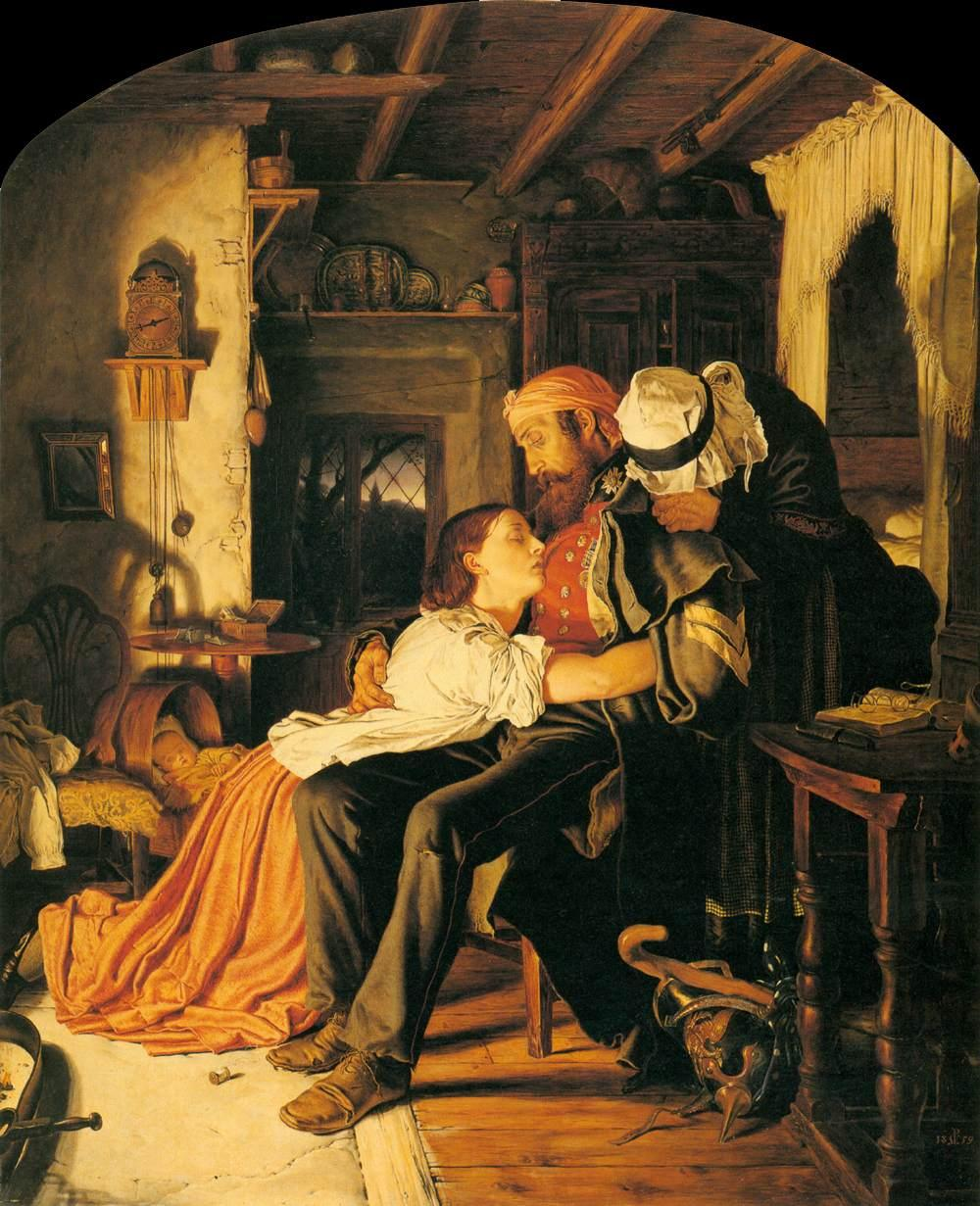
"Home" – The Return from the Crimea

Paton was born in Wooer's Alley, Dunfermline, Fife, on 13 December 1821 to Joseph Neil Paton and Catherine MacDiarmid, damask designers and weavers in the town. He was the brother of the sculptor Amelia Robertson Hill, and the landscape artist Waller Hugh Paton. He also had one brother, Archibald, and two sisters, Catherine and Alexia, who died in childhood. Later in his life, Paton erected a monument on the grave site of his parents and siblings. Their graves were probably originally unmarked; the monument lies on the north side of Dunfermline Abbey and—amongst nearby smaller, sandstone markers—is a distinctive red granite Celtic cross.

Paton attended Dunfermline School and then Dunfermline Art Academy, further enhancing the talents he had developed as a child. He followed the family trade by working as the design department director in a muslin factory for three years. Most of his life was spent in Scotland but he studied briefly at the Royal Academy, London in 1843, where he was tutored by George Jones. While studying in London, Paton met John Everett Millais, who asked him to join the Pre-Raphaelite Brotherhood.

== Career ==
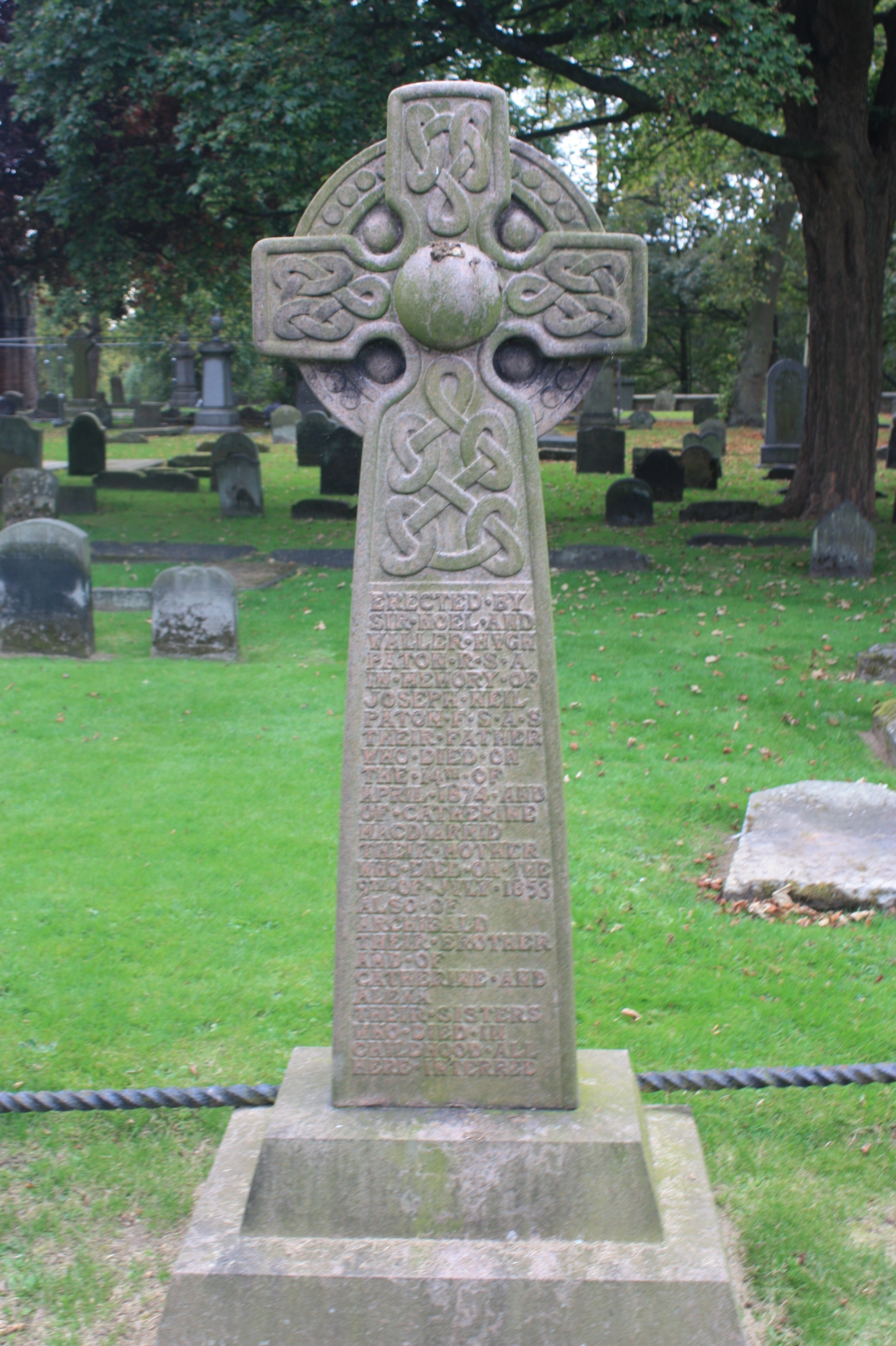
Paton's monument to his parents and siblings who died in childhood, Dunfermline Abbey

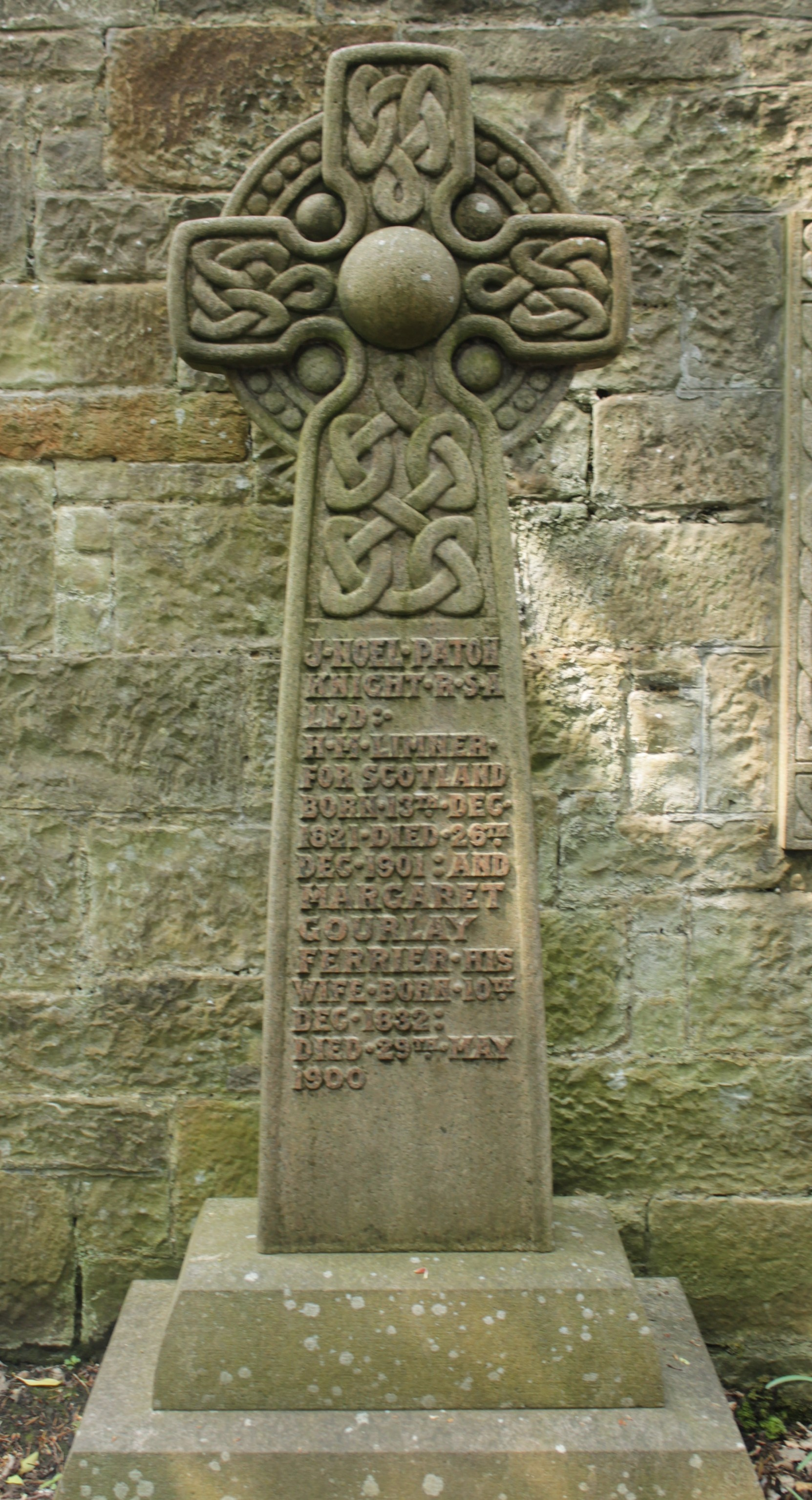
Paton's tombstone, Dean Cemetery

The invitation to be an official member of the Brotherhood was turned down by Paton although he painted in the Pre-Raphaelite style and became a painter of historical, fairy, allegorical and religious subjects. Together with Daniel Maclise, Paton was a folklore expert; according to Christopher Wood, an expert in Victorian art, Maclise and Paton were the only artists working in the genre of fairy paintings with expertise in folklore. Paton's knowledge of Celtic legends and Scottish folklore is reflected in his paintings. During his short spell in London, Paton became acquainted with Samuel Carter Hall, editor of The Art Journal, and he commissioned Paton to design some of the illustrations for his 1842 book The Book of British Ballads. Other commissions to design book illustrations included the 1844 edition of Shelley's lyrical drama Prometheus Unbound, an 1845 publication of Shakespeare's The Tempest and an 1863 version of Coleridge's poem The Rime of the Ancient Mariner.

In 1844 Paton's first painting, Ruth Gleaning, was exhibited at the Royal Scottish Academy. He won a number of prizes for his work including for two of his most famous works The Quarrel of Oberon and Titania and The Reconciliation of Oberon and Titania (1847 – Westminster Hall), both of which are available to public view at the National Gallery of Scotland. An earlier study of the Quarrel painting was completed in 1846 and featured as Paton's diploma picture at the Royal Scottish Academy that year. The Academy purchased the earlier work for £700.

Paton became an associate of the Royal Scottish Academy in 1847 and was made a Fellow in 1850. In 1865, he was appointed Queen's Limner for Scotland. He also published two volumes of poetry and produced a number of sculptures. Two years later he received a knighthood, and in 1878 was conferred the degree LLD by the University of Edinburgh.

In 1860 he was living at 37 Drummond Place in the New Town, Edinburgh.

Paton was a well known antiquary, whose specialty was arms and armour. In 1859 he raised and commanded the 1st Edinburgh (City) Artillery Volunteer Corps, composed mainly of artists with the painter John Faed as his lieutenant.

In 1875 Paton was one of the founding members of the Cockburn Association, the influential Edinburgh conservationist organisation, serving on its ruling council until 1885 when he became the campaigning group's vice-president, a position he retained until his death 16 years later.

He died in Edinburgh at his home 33 George Square on 26 December 1901, and is buried in Dean Cemetery (in the obscured lower terrace to the south).

== Family ==
In 1858, he married Margaret Gourlay Ferrier and the couple had 11 children (four daughters and seven sons). Their eldest son, Diarmid Noel Paton (1859–1928), became a Regius Professor of physiology at the University of Glasgow during 1906.

Their second son. Frederick W.F. Noel Paton (1861–1914), was Director General of Commercial Intelligence and Statistics for India and was a noted illustrator.

Another son, Ranald Alexander Noel Paton (born 8 June 1864), was also a portrait painter and married Winifred Jane Wallace.

His daughter, Hamilton Lora Paton (1868–1921), is buried 10 metres (33 ft) to his east with her husband, Robert Scott Moncrieff (1862–1923). Hamilton and Robert's daughter Madeline Scott Moncrieff married James Gordon McIntyre, Lord Sorn.

== Works ==
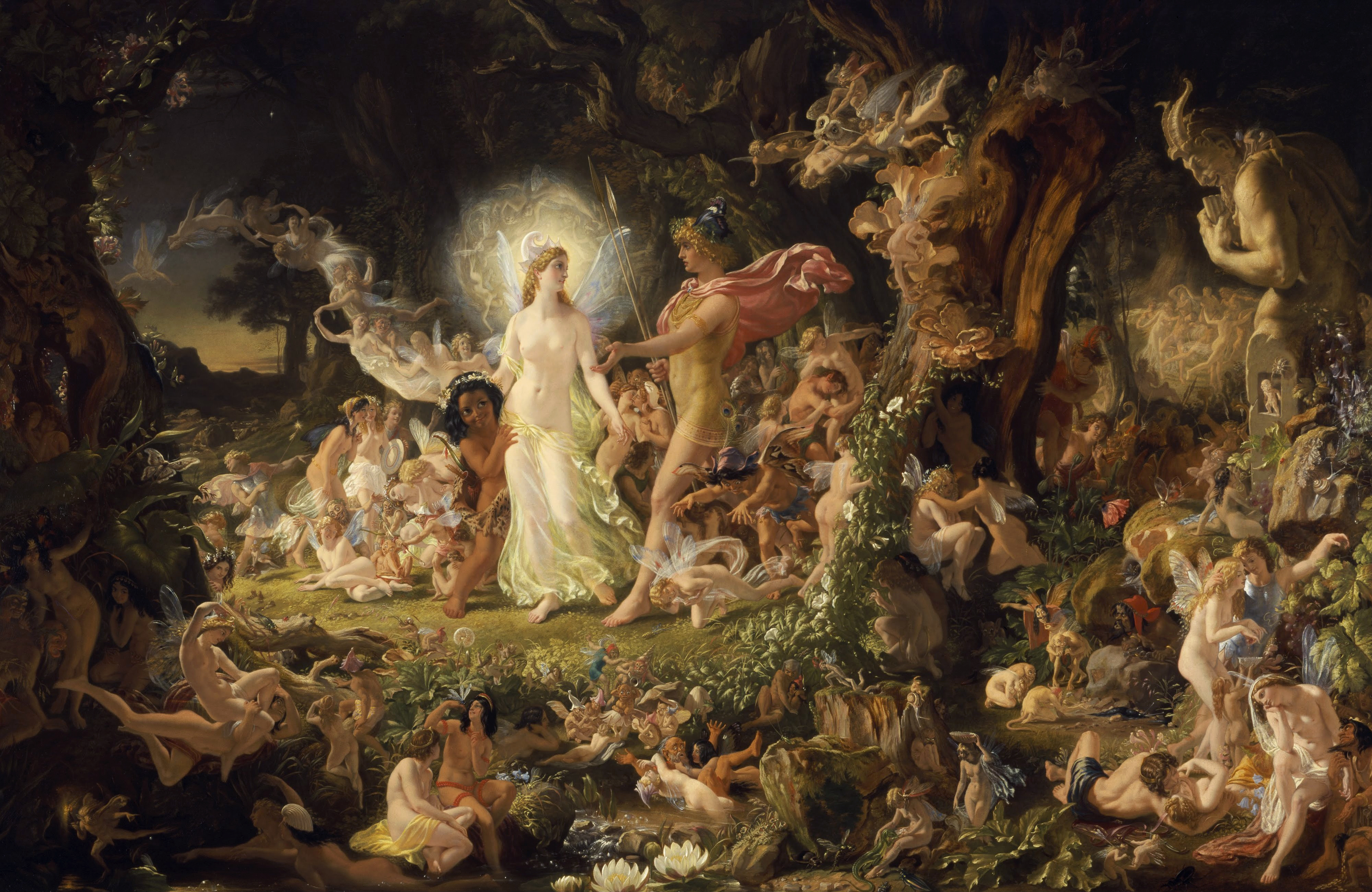
The Quarrel of Oberon and Titania

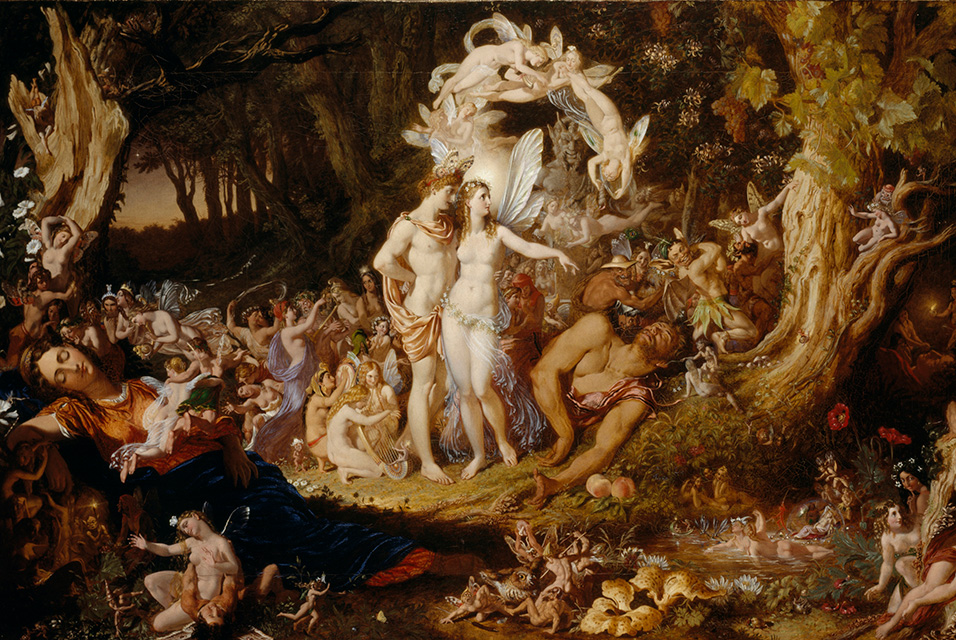
The Reconciliation of Titania and Oberon

- Cymocles Discovered by Atis in the Bowre Of Blisse, Spencer's Fairie Queene, Book II, Chapter V (1848)

(Type: Pen, ink and wash; Size: 8 1/4 × 12 inches (21 × 30.5 cm); Location: Public collection)

- Calvary (1849)

(Type: Pencil on paper; Size: 4 1/8 × 6 1/2 inches (10.5 × 16.8 cm); Location: Private collection)

- Sermon on the Mount (1849)

(Type: Pencil on paper; Size: 4 1/8 × 6 1/2 inches (10.5 × 16.8 cm); Location: Private collection)

- The Pursuit of Pleasure (1855)
- The Bluidie Tryst (1855)

(Type: Oil on Canvas; Size: 28 5/8 × 25 1/2 inches (73 × 65 cm); Location: Glasgow Art Gallery and Museum, Glasgow, Scotland)

- Home (c. 1855–56)

(Type: Oil on Panel Location: Chrysler Museum of Art, Norfolk, VA)

- Hesperus (1857)

(Type: Oil on canvas; Size: 35 3/4 × 27 1/8 inches (91 × 69 cm); Location: Glasgow Art Gallery and Museum, Glasgow, Scotland)

- In Memoriam (1858)

(Type: Oil on panel; Size: 48 3/8 × 37 7/8 inches (123 × 96.5 cm); Location: Private collection)

- By a Painter (1861) Poem
- Mors Janua Vitae (1866)
- Spindrift (1867) Poem
- The Fairy Raid: Carrying Off a Changeling – Midsummer Eve, 1867
- Oskold and the Ell-maids (1874)
- The Man with the Muck-Rake (1875–9)

(Location: Ferens Art Gallery, Hull City Museums collection, also a study for the same work (1872))

- In Die Malo (1882)
- How an Angel Rowed Sir Galahad Across the Dern Mere (1888)

(Type: Oil on canvas; Location: Private collection)

- Oberon and the Mermaid (1888)

(Type: Oil on canvas; Location: Private collection)

- The Spirit of Religion (cartoon) at Dunfermline City Chambers
- Sir Galahad

(Type: Oil on canvas; Location: Private collection)

- Warriors

(Type: Oil on canvas; Size: 23 × 27 7/8 inches (58.5 × 71 cm); Location: Private collection)

=== Gallery ===
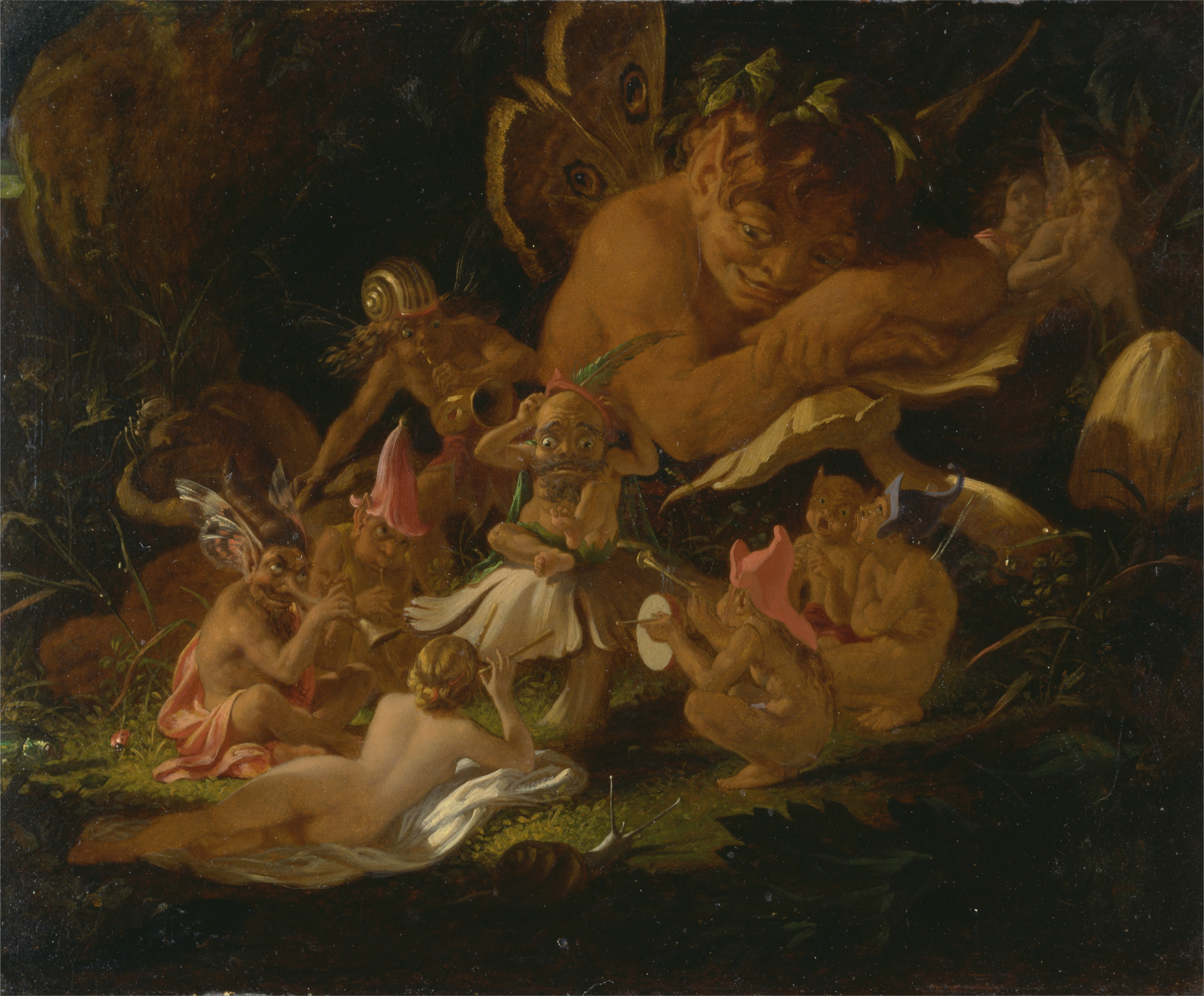
Puck and Fairies

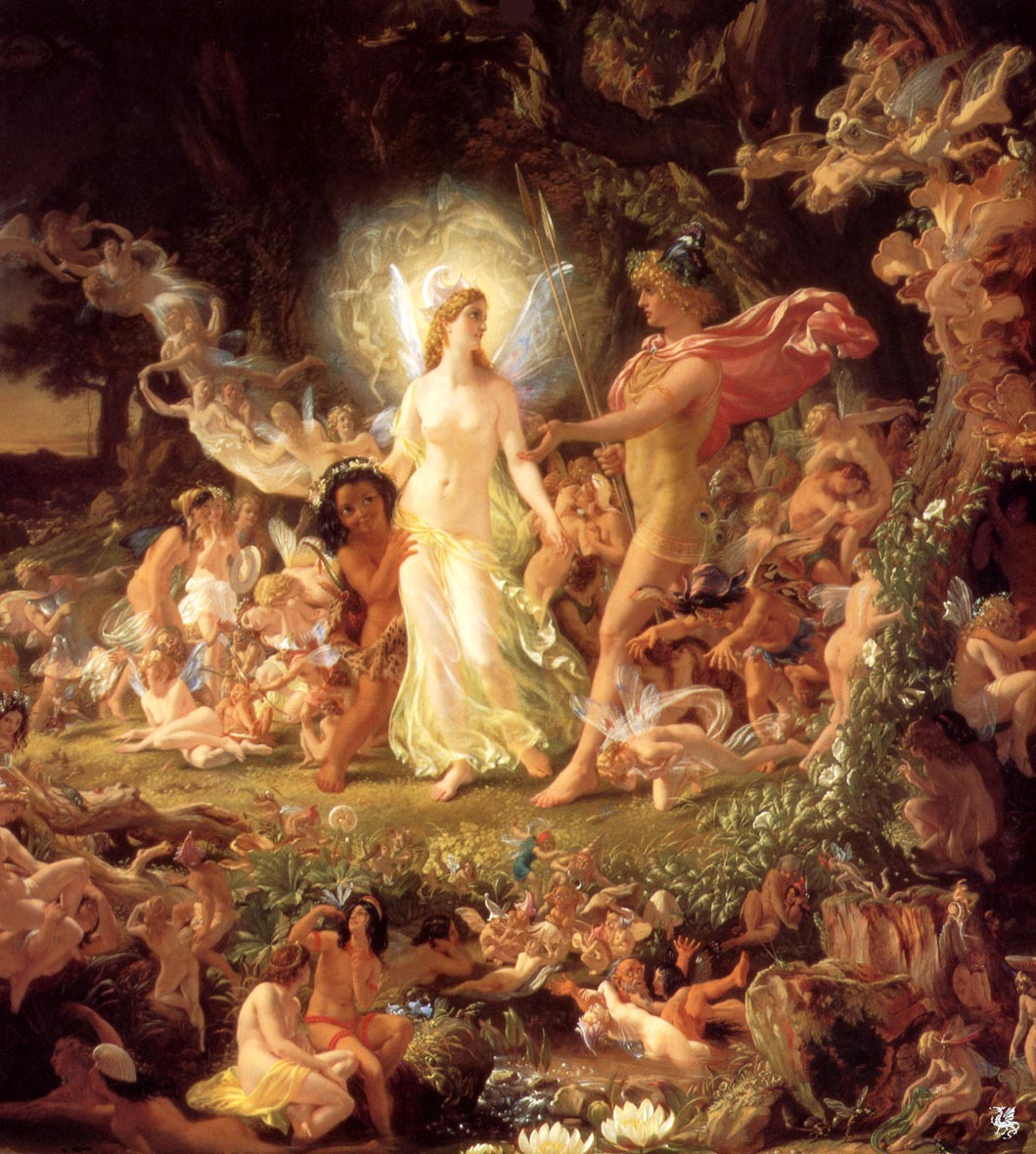
The Quarrel of Oberon and Titania (detail)

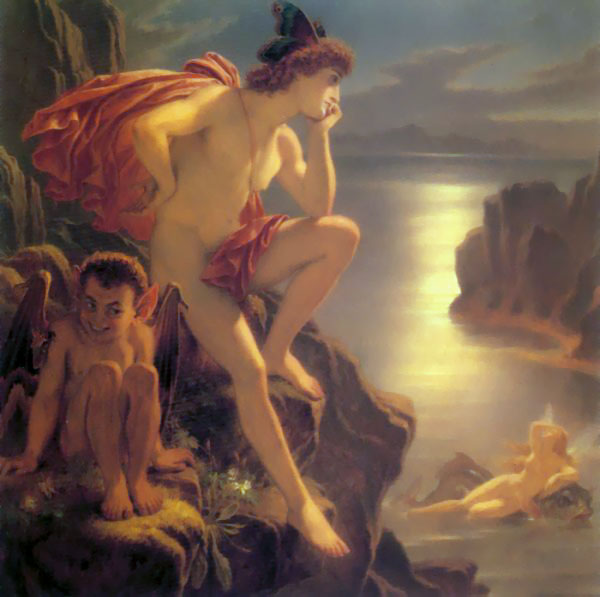
Oberon and the Mermaid

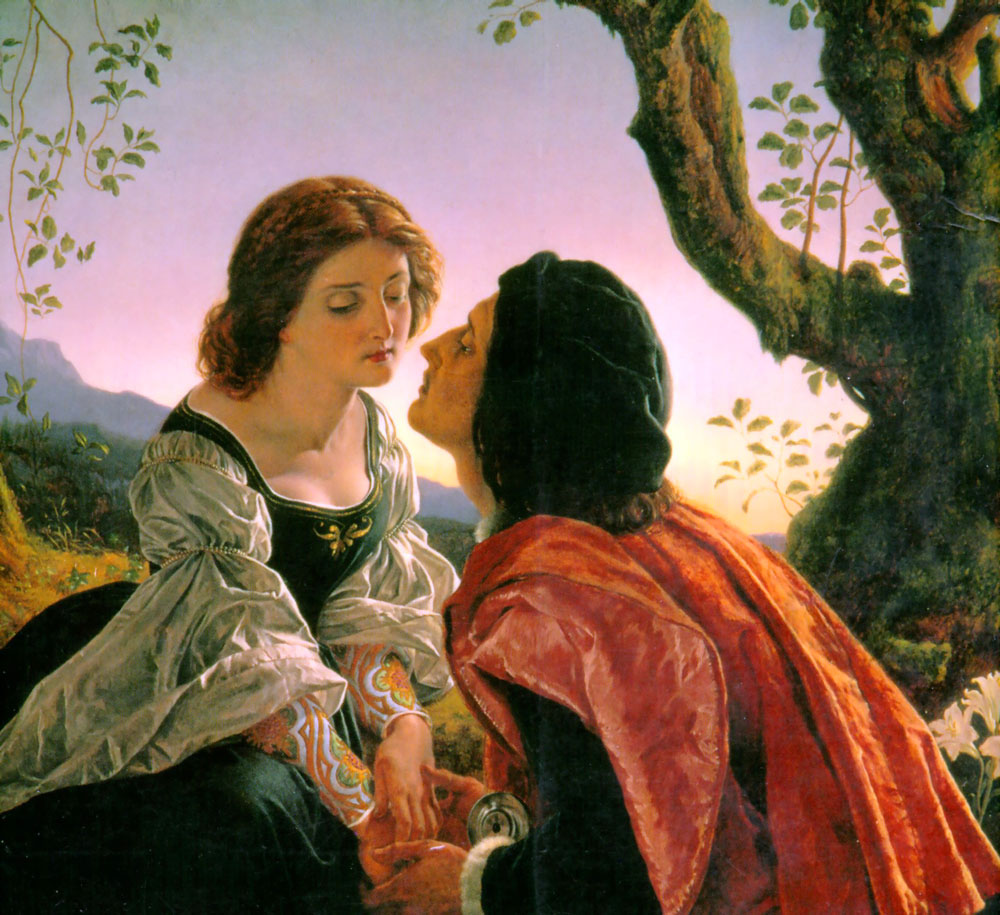
Hesperus (detail)

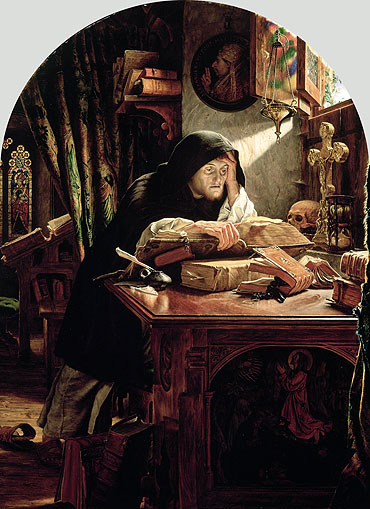
Luther Discovering Justification by Faith

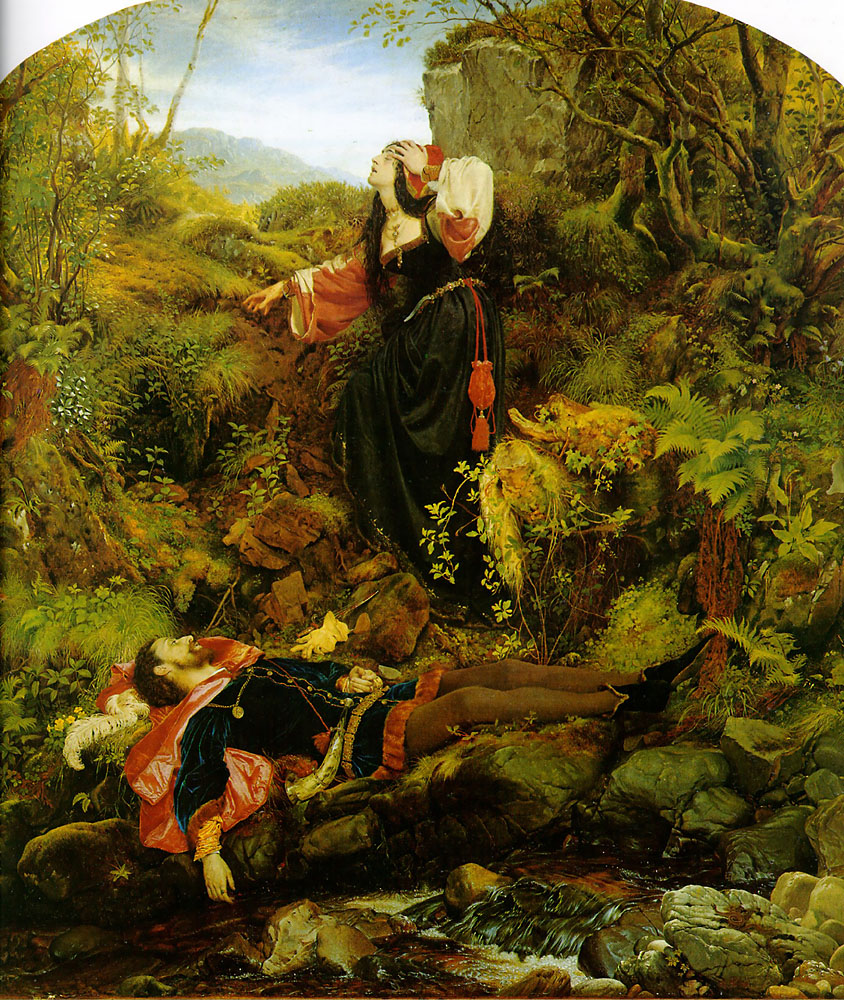
The Bluidie Tryst

== See also ==
- List of Pre-Raphaelite paintings – including the work of Joseph Noel Paton.
