= The Chase (Brack) =

Painting by John Brack

- Artist: John Brack
- Year: 1959
- Medium: oil on composition board
- Dimensions: 100.2 cm × 121.8 cm (39.4 in × 48.0 in)
- Location: Art Gallery of Ballarat; Ballarat

The Chase is a 1959 painting by Australian artist John Brack. The painting depicts three girls–Brack's daughters–running in a playful manner.

The painting has a similar theme to Brack's Two Running Girls and both were first exhibited in August 1959 at the Antipodeans Exhibition at the Victorian Artists Society galleries in Melbourne.

The painting was included in two major exhibitions of Brack's work hosted by the National Gallery of Victoria in 1987 and 2009. A study for the work remains in the Gallery's collection.

The Chase is a classic Brack piece, featuring the artist’s own daughters running in a playful manner. This energetic and important painting is a familiar, everyday subject that simultaneously depicts the fun and simplicity of childhood games while alluding to the darker side of human nature in the ‘shadows of anxiety’ that are cast by the running girls.

— Australian Arts Review,

Art Gallery of Ballarat director Louise Tegart noted "The Chase is one of Brack’s great paintings which would sit comfortably with the artist’s iconic works such as The Bar (1954), Collins St., 5 pm (1955) and The Car (1955)" and "While it appears quite a simplistic image, there’s a lot going on. It could be about children at play, a symbol of young girls moving into womanhood, or the performance of femininity and womanhood."

== Provenance ==
Brack's family donated the work to the Art Gallery of Ballarat in 2022 and it remains part of their collection.
