= 1954 in art =

Events from the year 1954 in art.

== Events ==
- November 18 – Publication of Yves Peintures (in Madrid), the first public showing of Yves Klein's work.
- December – Pablo Picasso begins painting his Les Femmes d'Alger ("The Women of Algiers") series in homage to Delacroix's 1834 painting of the same name and to the memory of Matisse.

== Awards ==
- Archibald Prize: Ivor Hele – Rt Hon R G Menzies, PC, CH, QC, MP
- New Year Honours – Knight Commander of the Order of the British Empire: Jacob Epstein

== Exhibitions ==
- Augustus John at the Royal Academy

== Works ==
- Francis Bacon
  - Figure with Meat (Art Institute of Chicago)
  - Two Figures in the Grass
- Thomas Hart Benton – The Kentuckian
- John Brack – The Bar (National Gallery of Victoria)
- Terence Cuneo
  - The Coronation of Her Majesty Queen Elizabeth II, Westminster Abbey, 2nd June 1953
  - The Coronation Luncheon for Her Majesty Queen Elizabeth in Guildhall, 12th June 1953
- Salvador Dalí
  - The Colossus of Rhodes
  - Crucifixion (Corpus Hypercubus)
  - The Disintegration of the Persistence of Memory
  - Young Virgin Auto-Sodomized by the Horns of Her Own Chastity
- Jared French - The Rope
- Franz Kline – Painting No 2 (Museum of Modern Art, New York)
- Willem de Kooning – Marilyn Monroe
- Fernand Léger – Stained-glass window at University City of Caracas
- L. S. Lowry – Piccadilly Gardens
- Sergei Orlov and others – Statue of Yuriy Dolgorukiy, Moscow
- Abbott Pattison – Iron Horse (sculpture)
- Pablo Picasso – Sylvette
- Norman Rockwell – Breaking Home Ties
- Simon Rodia - Watts Towers (sculptures-assemblage) (completed)
- Mark Rothko – Untitled (Yellow and Blue)
- Graham Sutherland – Portrait of Winston Churchill (later destroyed on orders issued by the Prime Minister's wife, Lady Clementine Churchill)
- Victor Vasarely – Hommage á Malévitch (ceramic wall at University City of Caracas)

== Births ==
- January 19 – Cindy Sherman, American photographer and artist
- February 6 – George Sherwood, American kinetic and landscape sculptor
- February 15 – Matt Groening, American cartoonist, animator and comics artist (The Simpsons)
- September 12 – Robert Gober, American sculptor
- December 6 – Nicola De Maria, Italian painter
- date unknown – Lubaina Himid, Zanzibar-born British graphic artist

== Deaths ==
- January 26 – Carl Eldh, Swedish painter and sculptor (b. 1873)
- February 21 – Augustin Lesage, French outsider artist (b. 1876)
- March 13 – César Klein, German painter and designer (b. 1876)
- May 5 – Henri Laurens, French sculptor (b. 1885)
- May 16 – Werner Bischof, Swiss photojournalist (b. 1916)
- May 25 – Robert Capa, Hungarian-born photojournalist (b. 1913)
- June 9 – Alain LeRoy Locke, American patron of the arts (b. 1886)
- July – Gaetano Orsolini, Italian sculptor, medallist and engraver (b. 1884)
- July 3 – Reginald Marsh, American painter (b. 1898)
- July 13 – Frida Kahlo, Mexican painter (b. 1907)
- August 28 – Leonid Sherwood, Russian sculptor (b. 1871)
- September 8
  - Sigvald Asbjørnsen, Norwegian American sculptor (b. 1867)
  - André Derain, French painter and illustrator (b. 1880)
- October 15 – Elwin Hawthorne, English painter (b. 1905)
- October 18 – Einar Jónsson, Icelandic sculptor (b. 1874)
- November 3 – Henri Matisse, French painter, sculptor and printmaker (b. 1869)
- December 23 – René Iché, French sculptor (b. 1897)

== See also ==
- 1954 in fine arts of the Soviet Union
