= 1955 in art =

Events from the year 1955 in art.

== Events ==
- January 21 – O. Winston Link starts a 5-year personal project to document steam operations on the Norfolk and Western Railway in the United States using flash photography.
- January 26 – A trial establishes that the recently "restored" "medieval" frescoes in St. Mary's Church, Lübeck, are in fact newly painted by Lothar Malskat and an associate.
- March – A Photographer's Gallery is established in New York City by Roy DeCarava.
- May 17 – The Clark Art Institute opens to the public in Williamstown, Massachusetts.
- June 1 – Première of Billy Wilder's film of The Seven Year Itch featuring an iconic scene of Marilyn Monroe standing on a New York City Subway grating as her white dress (created by Travilla) is blown above her knees.
- June 27 – Sir Jacob Epstein marries Kathleen Garman.
- October–November – Nikolaus Pevsner delivers this year's series of Reith Lectures on The Englishness of English Art, originally broadcast on BBC radio in the UK.
- December – Iris Clert Gallery opens in the rue des Beaux-Arts, Paris, and its owner, Iris Clert, first meets Yves Klein.
- date unknown
  - Marcel Duchamp becomes a citizen of the United States.
  - Pablo Picasso finishes painting his Les Femmes d'Alger ("The Women of Algiers") series (inspired by Delacroix), concluding with "Version O" which in 2015 will sell at a world record price for a painting at auction.
  - British studio potter Alan Caiger-Smith establishes Aldermaston Pottery in England.
  - Enrique Tábara obtains an Ecuadorian government scholarship to study in Spain.
  - Andy Warhol begins designing advertisements for New York shoe manufacturer Israel Miller.

== Awards ==
- Archibald Prize: Ivor Hele – Robert Campbell Esq.

== Works ==
- Michael Andrews – Four People Sunbathing (Arts Council England)
- Pietro Annigoni – Portrait of Elizabeth II
- Balthus
  - Girls on the Couch
  - Nude Before a Mirror
- John Brack
  - Collins St., 5 pm
  - The Car
- Edward Burra – Izzy Orts
- Lucien Clergue – Trio des Saltimbanques (photograph)
- Carroll Cloar – My Father Was Big as a Tree
- Pompeo Coppini – Statue of George Washington (bronze, University of Texas at Austin)
- Salvador Dalí – The Sacrament of the Last Supper (National Gallery of Art, Washington, D.C.) (completed)
- Ben Enwonwu – Anyanwu (sculpture)
- Sir Jacob Epstein – Christ in Majesty (sculpture for Llandaff Cathedral)
- M. C. Escher – lithographs
  - Compass Rose (Order and Chaos II)
  - Convex and Concave
  - Three Worlds
- Alberto Giacometti
  - Diego (approximate date)
  - Grande tête mince
- Oswaldo Guayasamín – El ataúd blanco
- Edward Hopper – South Carolina Morning
- Jasper Johns
  - Flag
  - White Flag
- Willem de Kooning
  - Composition
  - Woman as Landscape
  - Woman-Ochre
- Lee Krasner
  - Bald Eagle
  - Color Totem
- Norman Lewis – Harlem Turns White
- L. S. Lowry (Tate collection)
  - Industrial Landscape
  - A Young Man
- René Magritte – The Mysteries of the Horizon
- Georg Mayer-Marton — Crucifixion (mosaic and fresco in Roman Catholic Church of Holy Rosary in Fitton Hill, Oldham, England)
- Henry Moore
  - Upright Motive No. 1: Glenkiln Cross
  - Wall Relief no. 1 (carved brick, Bouwcentrum, Rotterdam)
- Sidney Nolan – Ned Kelly
- Pablo Picasso – Don Quixote (sketch for Les Lettres Françaises, August)
- Robert Rauschenberg – Bantam
- Norman Rockwell – Marriage License
- Mark Rothko – Violet Center
- Charles Sheeler – The Web
- Hedda Sterne – New York, N.Y., 1955

== Exhibitions ==
- January – The Family of Man, a photography exhibition curated by Edward Steichen, opens at the Museum of Modern Art, New York.
- October – First public exhibition of Yves Klein's monochrome oil paintings, at Club des Solitaires, Paris.
- November 3–December 18 – Stanley Spencer: a Retrospective Exhibition at the Tate Gallery, London.
- Le Mouvement at Galerie Denise René, Paris, popularizing kinetic art.
- Exhibition by London members of Groupe Espace, organized by Paule Vézelay at the Royal Festival Hall.

== Births ==
- January 15 – Andreas Gursky, German large format photographer
- January 21 – Jeff Koons, American "kitsch" artist
- February 2 – Madi Phala, South African artist (d. 2007)
- March 10 – Mark Landis, American painter and art forger
- March 24 – Beverly K. Effinger, American painter
- April 5 – Akira Toriyama, Japanese manga and video game artist (d. 2024)
- May 20 – Anton Corbijn, Dutch photographer and videographer
- July 29 – Dave Stevens, American illustrator and comics artist (d. 2008)
- August 2 – PHASE 2 (Lonny Wood), American graffiti artist (d. 2019)
- November 15 – Sergey Voychenko, Belarusian artist and designer (d. 2004)
- undated
  - Manasie Akpaliapik, Canadian Inuk sculptor
  - Jaume Plensa, Catalan sculptor
  - Mariana Cook, American portrait photographer
  - Scott Kim, American ambigram artist and puzzle designer
  - Miroslav Grčev, Macedonian architect and graphic designer
  - Rebecca Salter, English printmaker and multimedia abstract artist, President of the Royal Academy
  - Alexander Sokolov, sculptor working in Spain

== Deaths ==
- January 1 – Maria Bal, Polish model (b. 1879)
- January 7 – Lamorna Birch, English painter (b. 1869)
- February 11 – Olga Khokhlova, Russian-born ballet dancer and estranged wife of Picasso (b. 1891)
- March 9 – Nels N. Alling, Danish-American sculptor (b. 1861)
- March 13 – Evie Hone, Irish painter and stained glass artist (b. 1894)
- March 16 – Nicolas de Staël, Russian-born French impasto painter (b. 1914)
- May 3 – Rudolf Schlichter, German painter (b. 1890)
- May 10 – John Radecki, Polish-born Australian stained glass artist (b. 1865)
- May 11 – Bradley Walker Tomlin, American painter (b. 1899)
- May 23 – Auguste Chabaud, French painter (b. 1882)
- June 1 – Antonio Dattilo Rubbo, Italian-born Australian painter and art teacher (b. 1870)
- June 29 – Max Pechstein, German Expressionist artist (b. 1881)
- August 17 – Fernand Léger, French artist (b. 1881)
- September 19 – Carl Milles, Swedish sculptor (b. 1875)
- September 27 – Leslie Garland Bolling, African American sculptor (b. 1898)
- November 5 – Maurice Utrillo, French painter (b. 1883)
- November 29 – Rene Paul Chambellan, American sculptor (b. 1893)
- December 17 – Dorothea Sharp, English painter (b. 1874)
- December 19 – Alexander Lubimov, Russian artist (b. 1879)
- December 28 – Olive Edis, English photographer (b. 1876)

== See also ==
- 1955 in fine arts of the Soviet Union
