= Latin American Grand Final =

Painting by John Brack

- Artist: John Brack
- Year: 1969
- Medium: oil on canvas
- Dimensions: 167.5 cm × 205 cm (65.9 in × 81 in)
- Location: National Gallery of Australia, Canberra
- Website: artsearch.nga.gov.au

Latin American Grand Final is a 1969 painting by Australian artist John Brack. Part of a series of paintings on the theme of ballroom dancing painted by Brack in the late 1960s, the painting depicts two ballroom dancers – a man and a woman – in a dance competition.

== Composition ==
Ballroom dancing was an activity that attracted Brack by means of its "absurdity ... a natural activity, such as dance, [converted] into a demanding and challenging ritual." As part of his research Brack attended the 1967 World Ballroom Dancing Championships held at Festival Hall in Melbourne. He also collected photographs of ballroom dancing and subscribed to Australasian Dancing Times – a ballroom dancing magazine.

The painting shows the "lissom dancers in their richly decorated dresses and high-heeled shoes". It also includes a self-portrait of the artist in the top-left corner, "more vulnerable than the rest, dancing alone without a partner."

The painting, with its blaze of neon pinks, stinging reds and sharp thrusts of black, is full of sexual symbolism set within a very formalised choreographed ritual. The generous billowing and bulbous ballroom dresses are frequently shown encroached upon by a dancer’s leg, either bold and erect or curved and limp

— Sasha Grishin,

== Reception ==
This painting and his other ballroom dancing works were first exhibited in 1970. While Brack thought this exhibition was his best work – better even than his 1955 paintings such as Collins St., 5 pm – sales were slow and critical reaction was mixed. Many critics felt that the "paintings were absurd and the colours jarring". However, the works are now among the artist's most popular and sought after.

I considered I had made at last a significant advance on the superficiality of the Collins Street picture, while at the same time, not making the picture look over complicated. You see, the problem was to make it operate on different levels of meaning, but to make it look perhaps deceptively simple

— John Brack,

The assistant curator of Australian painting and sculpture at the National Gallery of Australia, Lara Nicholls, claims Brack uses dance as a metaphor for life and this work shows "false intimacy and false joy".

Here is this scenario which is ostensibly quite romantic, a man and a woman dancing to music, but it is a competition where you must maintain this veneer of fun and joy, but it is quite anxiety inducing because they are in fact performing to a set of rules and everything is so scrutinised by the judge, who you see looming in the right hand corner

— Lara Nicholls,

== Provenance ==
The work was purchased by the National Gallery of Australia in 1981 and remains part of their collection.
