= Iron Horse (sculpture) =

Sculpture in Greene County, Georgia

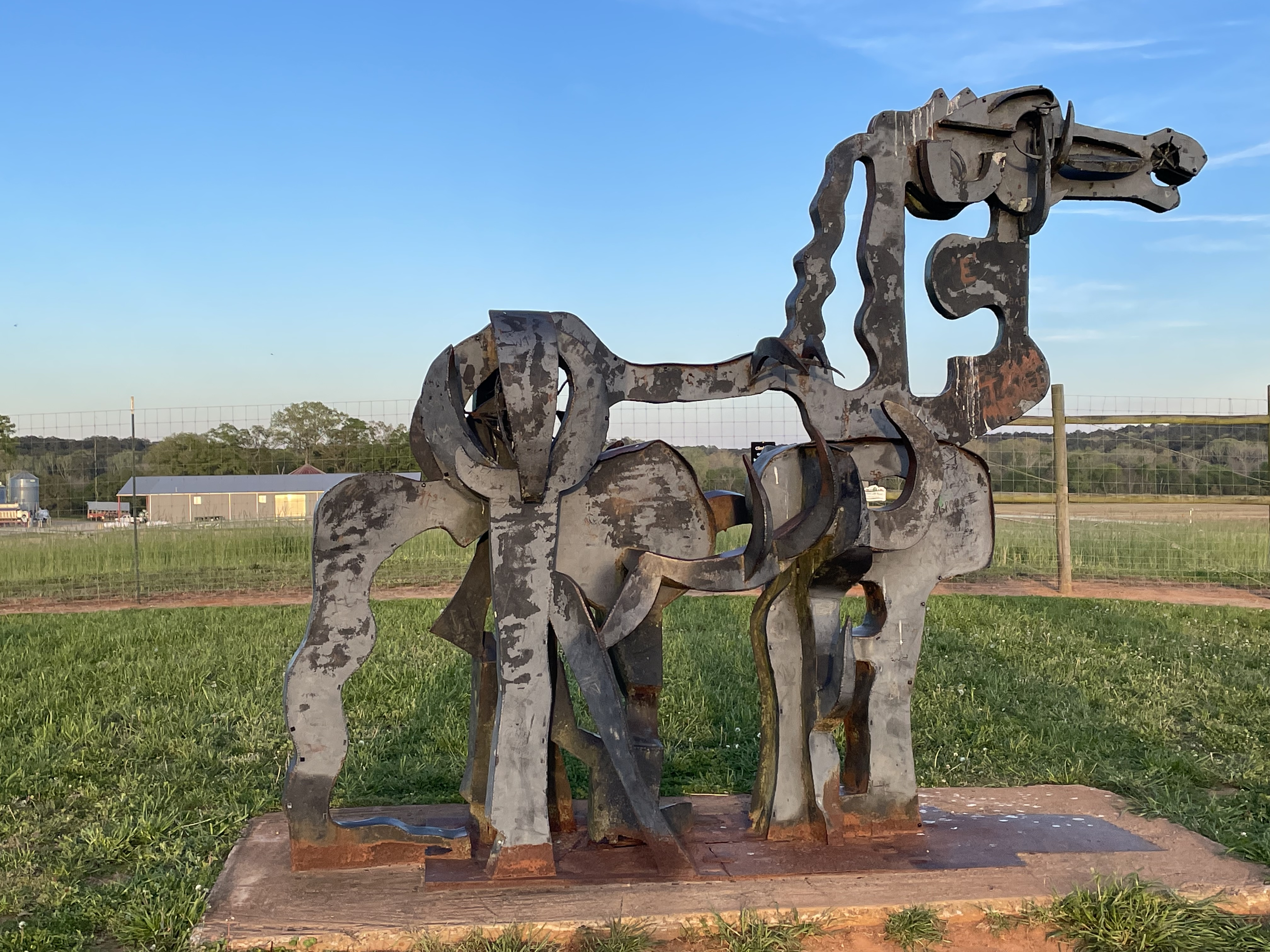
- The Iron Horse prior to its restoration in 2024

- Location within Georgia Location within the United States
- Artist: Abbott Pattison
- Year: 1954
- Type: Sculpture
- Medium: Steel
- Subject: Horse
- Dimensions: 370 cm (144 in)
- Location: Greene County, Georgia, U.S.; 33°43′37″N 83°18′03″W

Iron Horse (also known as Pegasus Without Wings) is a 2-ton, 12-foot-tall steel sculpture created by Abbott Pattison. Although the sculpture was not well-received at first, as of the second decade of the twenty-first century it is visited by many tourists and University of Georgia students.

== History ==
On May 25, 1954, Abbott Pattison, then a sculptor in residence at the University of Georgia, produced the sculpture while at the university and initially placed it there outside Reed Hall. However, after the sculpture was vandalized by disgruntled students, the sculpture was secretly moved to a barn. It remained there until horticulture professor L.C. Curtis moved it to his farm near Watkinsville, Georgia in 1959. In an interview with The New York Times in 1979, Curtis claimed that he wanted the sculpture from Lamar Dodd, the chairman of the art department at the time, because "I collect conversation pieces. I'm a little bit of an eccentric." In 2011, the sculpture was vandalized once again. Afterwards, a secret group restored the horse. Later the Curtis family had the sculpture bolted to a concrete pad because periodically people would knock it over.

Around 2012 the Curtis family sold approximately 650 acres of the farm to the University of Georgia, but retained a 20-foot by 20-foot section where the horse they then owned stood. In 2014 in honor of the sculpture, the university named the portion of the farm it purchased the "Iron Horse Plant Sciences Farm", which the university uses for agricultural research. Subsequently, the Curtis family offered to deed the horse and remaining 400 square feet to the university on the condition the horse stayed in place; however, the university insisted that the sculpture be returned to campus. Eventually, the sculpture and the land were given to the university by Curtis's daughter-in-law Patty Curtis and her daughter Alice Hugel in 2024.

In spring of 2024, the concrete pad to which the sculpture had been attached was broken up, and the Iron Horse was transported to Athens, Georgia. There, art conservator Amy Jones Abbe and metalsmith Don Cope oversaw its restoration. Due to changes from Pattison's sketches that the artist had made during construction, the team used a small number of available photographs as reference to guide restoration, including the addition of 32 pieces that had gone missing due to exposure or vandalism. The finished restoration was then painted and covered with epoxy. On November 22, 2024, the restored sculpture was transported back to the Iron Horse Plant Sciences Farm and installed on its former site on a new plinth made of Georgia granite. In February 2025, strong 60-70 mph winds toppled the sculpture since bolts weren't properly installed onto the statue. No major damage was found. Two days later, the statue was reinstalled with bolts installed into the statue.

== In popular culture ==
The early history of the sculpture was depicted in the 1963 National Educational Television film, Pegasus Without Wings as well as the 1980 William VanDerKloot documentary, Iron Horse.

== See also ==
- 1954 in art
