= The Car (Brack) =

Painting by John Brack

- Artist: John Brack
- Year: 1955
- Medium: oil on canvas
- Dimensions: 41.0 cm × 102.2 cm (16.1 in × 40.2 in)
- Location: National Gallery of Victoria, Melbourne
- Website: http://www.ngv.vic.gov.au/col/work/3139

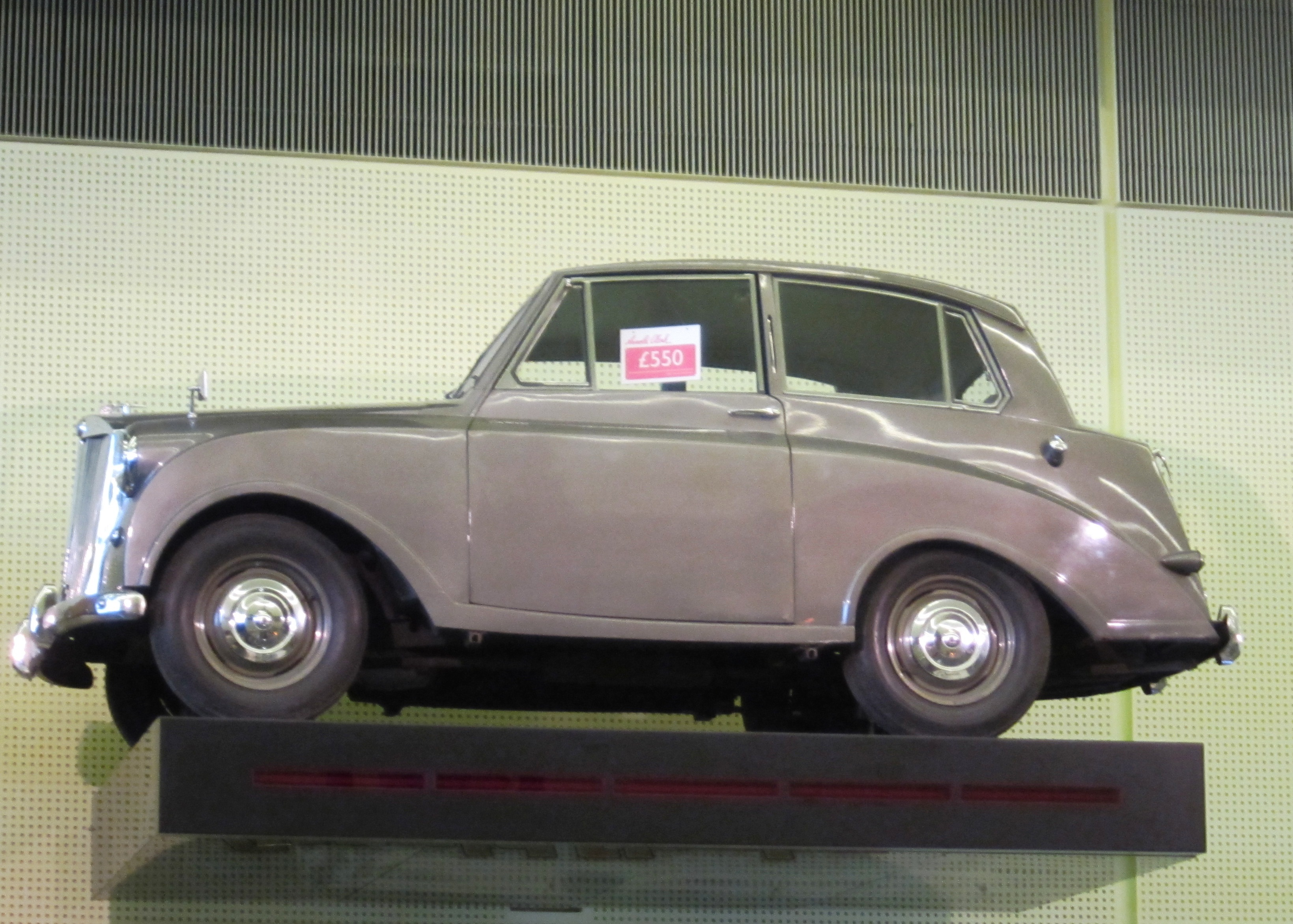
A Triumph Mayflower, the eponymous car

The Car is a 1955 painting by Australian artist John Brack. The painting depicts a family in a car on a drive in a rural area. The painting shows the father looking at the road ahead while the mother and children look towards the viewer. While the whole car cannot be seen, the car itself is identifiable as a Triumph Mayflower. The landscape, seen through the windows of the car, has been said to be inspired by the work of his contemporary Fred Williams.

The work was painted around the same time as two of Brack's best-known paintings, Collins Street., 5 pm (1955) and The Bar (1954).

Brack described how he came to paint the work:

Walking in a suburban street one day the car passed me and, as it did so, the occupants looked out. This seemed to compose itself as picture instantly, which I have found to be rare ... The paraphernalia of the street, houses and telegraph poles, seemed to rob the faces of dramatic emphasis. I think that the country landscape solved this problem and serves also to illustrate a social phenomenon important in our time: the family making an afternoon trip from the city to the nearby country on Sunday. It was part of the pattern of life of millions.

— John Brack,

Kirsty Grant, Senior Curator of Australian Art at the National Gallery of Victoria claims that The Car is one of Brack's more popular works stating "I think it transports people who lived through that time, whether they are adults or children, back to that era ...The Car is familiar. It is about people and the way we behave and our foibles."

The painting is part of the National Gallery of Victoria's Australian art collection. The painting was part of the Australia exhibition at the Royal Academy in 2013.
