= 1876 in art =

Events from the year 1876 in art.

== Events ==
- April – Impressionist exhibition at the house of Paul Durand-Ruel, 11 rue Peletier, in Paris, accompanied by Louis Edmond Duranty's essay The New Painting.
- May 1 – The Royal Academy Exhibition of 1876 opens at Burlington House in London
- May 16 – German American "Napoleon of crime" Adam Worth steals Gainsborough's Portrait of Georgiana, Duchess of Devonshire from Agnew's gallery in Old Bond Street, London three weeks after its sale at Christie's for 10,000 guineas, the highest price ever paid for a painting at auction at this time. It is not recovered until 1901.
- Henrietta Montalba exhibits at the Royal Academy for the first time.
- Kathleen Newton moves into the London home of James Tissot, becoming his mistress and model.

== Paintings ==
Renoir – Bal du moulin de la Galette

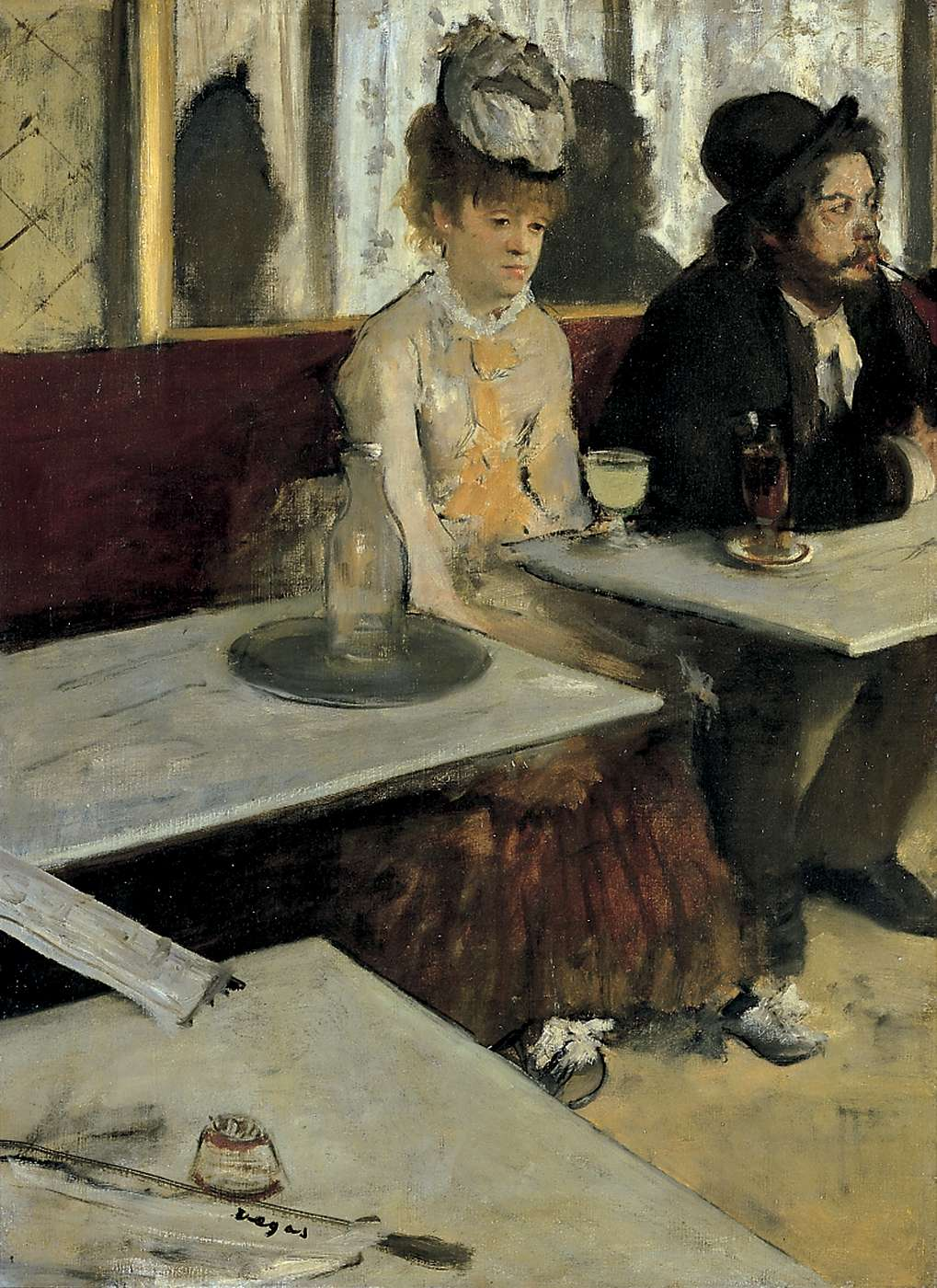
Degas – L'Absinthe

- Lawrence Alma-Tadema
  - An Audience at Agrippa's
  - Ninety-Four Degrees in the Shade
- Thomas Armstrong – Woman with Lilies
- Edward Mitchell Bannister – Under the Oaks
- Albert Fitch Bellows – Sunday in Devonshire
- Gustave Caillebotte
  - Le déjeuner ("Lunch")
  - Le Pont de l'Europe ("The Europe Bridge")
  - Portraits in the country
  - Young Man at the Piano (Martial Caillebotte)
- Paul Cézanne – Vase of Flowers
- Ernest Christophe – La Comédie humaine – Le Masque (marble; Musée d'Orsay, Paris)
- Georges Clairin – Portrait de Sarah Bernhardt
- Charles West Cope – The Council of the Royal Academy Selecting Pictures for the Exhibition, 1875
- Gustave Courbet – Entree d'un Gave
- Edgar Degas
  - L'Absinthe (Musée d'Orsay, Paris)
  - Dichesa di Montejasi with her Daughters, Elena and Camilla (Museum of Fine Arts, Boston)
- Paul Dubois – My Children
- Thomas Eakins – The Chess Players
- Jean-Léon Gérôme – Pool in a Harem
- Winslow Homer – Breezing Up ("A Fair Wind")
- James Clarke Hook – Crabbers
- James Wilson Alexander MacDonald – Statue of Fitz-Greene Halleck (bronze, New York City)
- John MacWhirter – Spindrift
- Édouard Manet – Before the Mirror (Guggenheim Museum, New York City)
- Anton Mauve – Morning Ride on the Beach
- John Everett Millais
  - Lord Ronald Gower
  - The Sound of Many Waters
  - The Twins
  - The Yeoman of the Guard
- Claude Monet
  - Coin du jardin à Montgeron (Hermitage Museum, Saint Petersburg)
  - La Japonaise (Camille Monet in Japanese Costume)
- Gustave Moreau – Salome Dancing before Herod
- Pierre-Auguste Renoir
  - A Girl with a Watering Can (National Gallery of Art, Washington, D.C.)
  - Bal du moulin de la Galette ("Dance at Le Moulin de la Galette") (Musée d'Orsay, Paris)
  - The Swing
  - In the Garden (Pushkin Museum, Moscow)
- Ilya Repin – Sadko
- Emma Sandys – Fiammetta
- Henryk Siemiradzki – Nero's Torches
- William James Stillman – English Wild Flowers
- Elizabeth Thompson – Balaclava
- James Tissot
  - The Convalescent
  - A Passing Storm
  - The Thames
- Viktor Vasnetsov – Moving House
- James McNeill Whistler
  - Chelsea Snow
  - Henry Irving as Philip II of Spain

== Sculptures ==
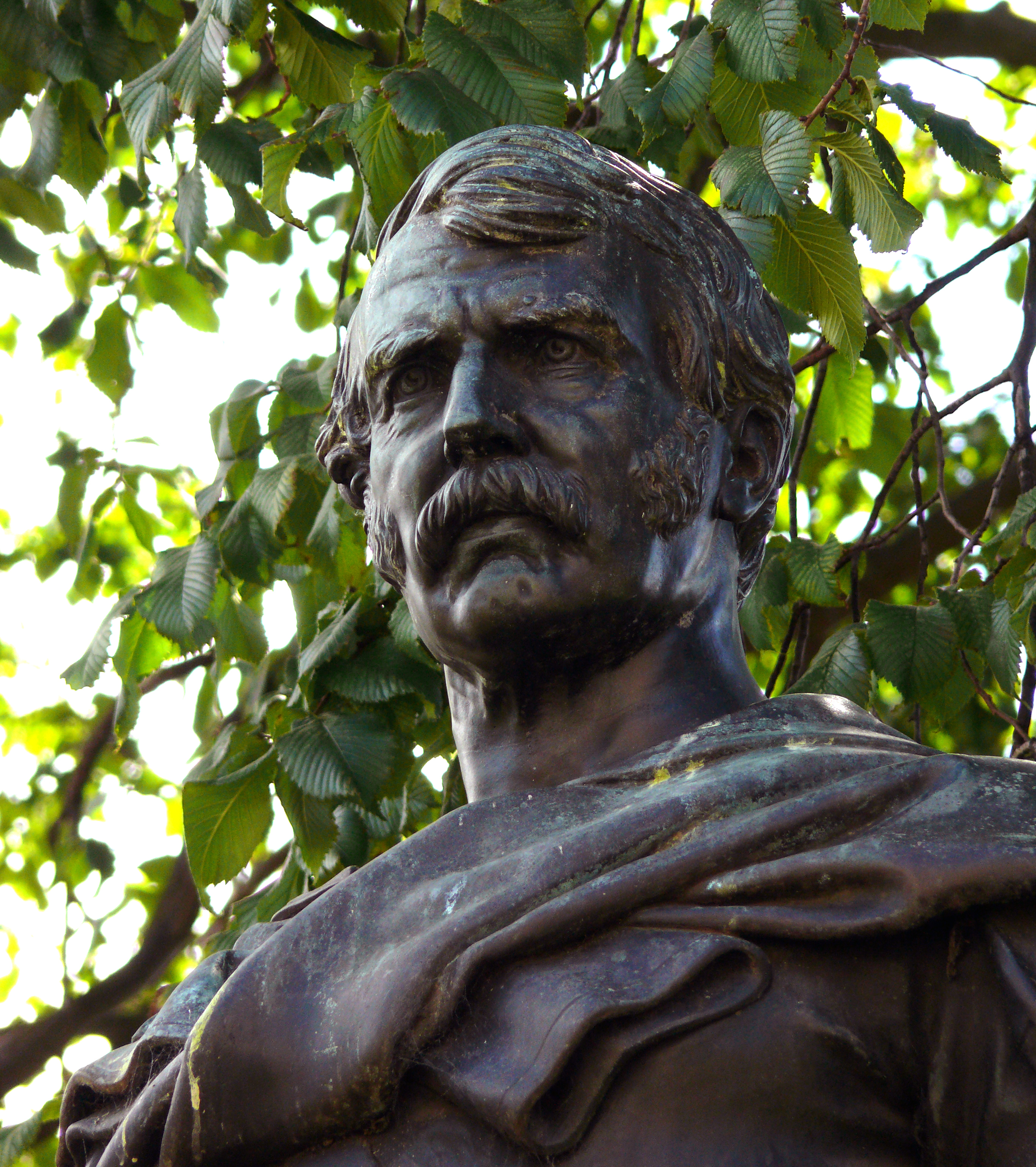
Statue of David Livingstone

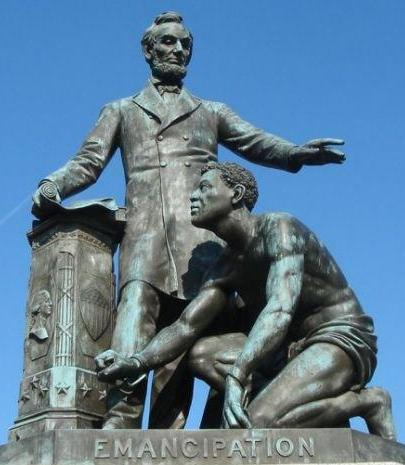
Emancipation Memorial

- Thomas Ball
  - Emancipation Memorial
  - Statue of Daniel Webster
- Frédéric Auguste Bartholdi
  - Bartholdi Fountain
  - Statue of the Marquis de Lafayette
- Charles E. Cassell – Confederate Monument
- Carl Conrads – The American Volunteer
- Andrew Currie – Statue of Robert the Bruce, Stirling Castle
- Moses Jacob Ezekiel – Religious Liberty
- Fratelli Gianfranchi – Statue of George Washington
- Richard Saltonstall Greenough – John Winthrop
- Herman Kirn – Catholic Total Abstinence Union Fountain
- James Wilson Alexander MacDonald – Statue of Fitz-Greene Halleck
- Matthew Noble – Statue of Robert Peel, Parliament Square
- Louis Rebisso – Equestrian statue of James B. McPherson
- Amelia Robertson Hill – Statue of David Livingstone, Edinburgh
- Randolph Rogers – Statue of William H. Seward
- Horatio Stone – Statue of Edward Dickinson Baker
- Anne Whitney – Statue of Samuel Adams
- Unknown – Confederate Monument of Bowling Green
- Unknown – Dauphin County Veteran's Memorial Obelisk

== Births ==
- February 8 – Paula Modersohn-Becker, German painter and draftswoman (died 1907)
- Ásgrímur Jónsson - Ásgrímur Jónsson, Icelandic painter (died 1958)
- March 23 – Muirhead Bone, Scottish-born etcher (died 1953)
- April 1 – Jacoba van Heemskerck, Dutch painter and graphic artist (died 1923)
- April 11 – Paul Henry, Irish painter (died 1958)
- June 22 – Madeleine Vionnet, French fashion designer (died 1975)
- July 12 – Alphaeus Philemon Cole, American portrait artist (died 1988)
- July 17 – Melvin Ormond Hammond, Canadian photographer (died 1934)
- August 9 – Augustin Lesage, French outsider artist (died 1954)
- September 3 – Olive Edis, English photographer (died 1955)
- September 14 – César Klein, German painter and designer (died 1954)
- November 4 – James Earle Fraser, American sculptor (died 1953)
- November 17 – August Sander, German photographer (died 1964)
- December 23 – Stevan Aleksić, Serbian painter (died 1923).
- date unknown – Hiroshi Yoshida, Japanese painter and woodblock print maker (died 1950)

== Deaths ==
- January 22 – Sir George Harvey, Scottish painter (born 1806)
- February 29
  - Charles-Philippe Larivière, French academic painter and lithographer (born 1798)
  - Jozef Van Lerius, Belgian romantic-historical painter (born 1823)
- March 13 – Joseph von Führich, Austrian painter (born 1800)
- April 8 – John Graham Lough, English sculptor of funerary monuments (born 1798)
- June 11 – Giovanni Battista Cassevari, Italian miniature portrait painter (born 1789)
- August 15 – John Frederick Lewis, English painter (born 1805)
- August 27 – Eugène Fromentin, French painter (born 1820)
- September 17 – Franz Nadorp, German painter primarily working and living in Rome (born 1794)
- October 21 – Uroš Knežević, Serbian painter (born 1811)
- November 10 – Édouard Traviès, French painter (born 1809)
- November 18 – Narcisse Virgilio Diaz, French painter (born 1807)
- date unknown – Robert Richard Scanlan, Irish painter and portraitist (born 1801)
