= Statue of Fitz-Greene Halleck =

Statue by James Wilson Alexander MacDonald in Central Park, Manhattan, New York, U.S.

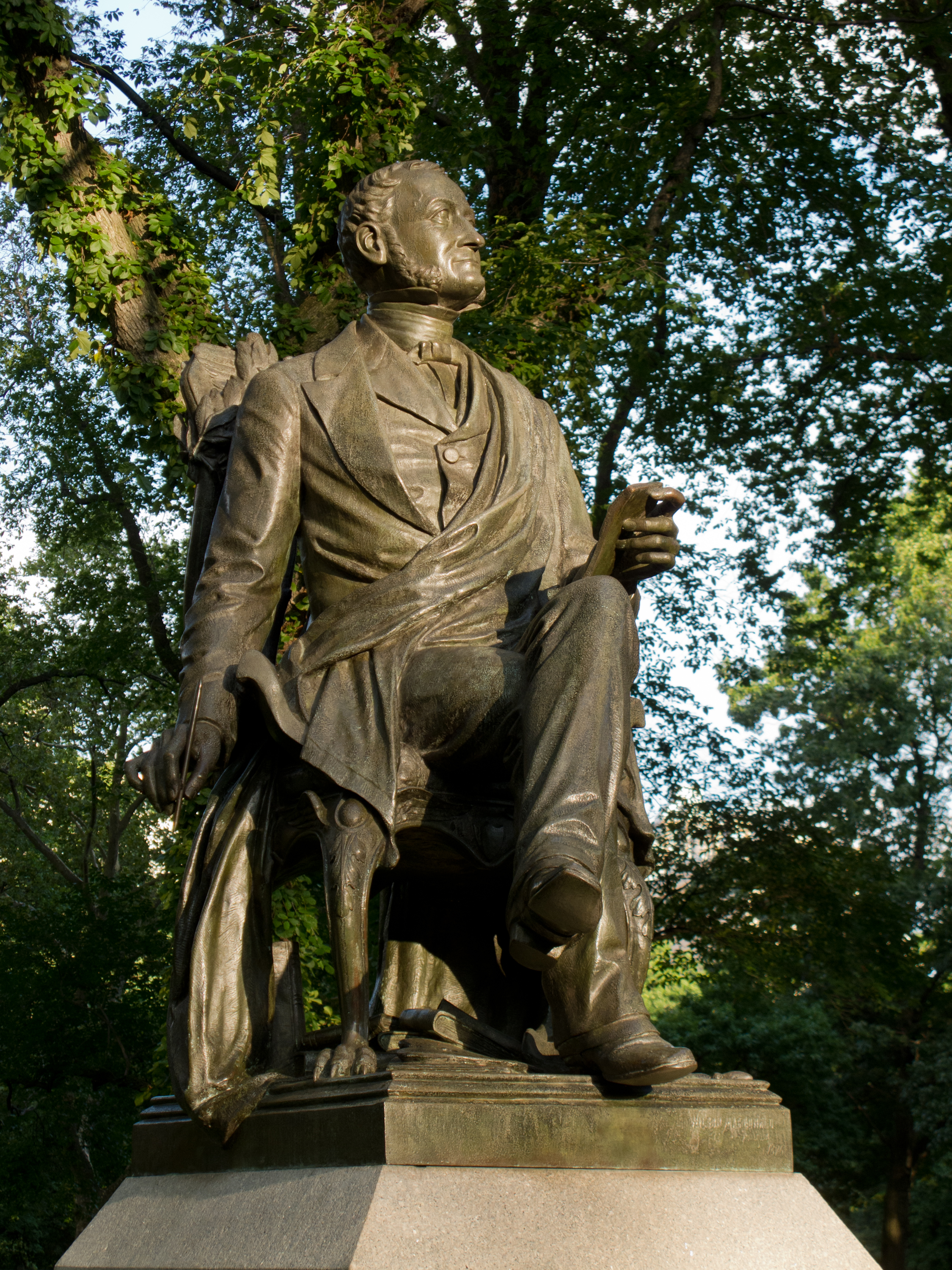
- The sculpture in 2012
- Artist: James Wilson Alexander MacDonald
- Year: 1876
- Type: Sculpture
- Medium: Bronze
- Subject: Fitz-Greene Halleck
- Location: New York City, New York, United States; 40°46′14″N 73°58′20″W

An outdoor bronze sculpture of Fitz-Greene Halleck by James Wilson Alexander MacDonald is installed in Central Park in Manhattan, New York. Commissioned by William Cullen Bryant and James Grant Wilson following Halleck's death in 1867, the statue was cast in 1876 and installed in 1877, becoming the first in Central Park depicting an American. An estimated 10,000 people attended its dedication on May 15, 1877.

== History ==
- Fitz-Greene Halleck has been described as the least known literary figure today on the "Literary Walk," despite being the only person to have a memorial unveiled by the then-president of the United States, Rutherford B. Hayes in 1877, ten years after his death in November 1867. The monument was funded by the use of public subscription, and had a long list of prominent guests and speakers at the dedication and unveiling of the monument, among them the president's cabinet, General of the Army William T.Sherman, the poets Bayard Taylor, George Henry Boker and William Cullen Bryant, as well as other notable citizens. The monument is made in bronze by James Wilson Alexander MacDonald, and is placed near the Literary Walk and The Mall. The monument has been thoroughly refurbished by The Central Park Conservancy, first by hot waxing it in 1983, and then again in 1992, as well as in 1999, when it was dewaxed, pressure-washed and repatinated, and then protected by a coating of a corrosion-inhibiting lacquer.

== See also ==
- 1876 in art
