= Helen Maudsley =

Australian artist (born 1927)

- Born: 1927 (age 98–99); Melbourne, Australia
- Occupation: Artist
- Spouse: John Brack

Helen Maudsley (born 1927) is an Australian artist, who has been described as "one of Australia's most tenacious and perhaps most underrated artists". Born in Melbourne in 1927, Maudsley has had regular solo exhibitions since 1957. She is best known for her complex paintings and drawings that use abstraction and visual analogy to describe inner and outer worlds. Maudsley describes her paintings as "visual essays", in that they are focused, methodical attempts to explore a concept. Through exploration of visual language, Maudsley uses lines, numbers, shapes, letters, geometry and symbols to construct geometric labyrinth-like compositions that explore her everyday experiences.

== Life and education ==
Maudsley grew up in South Yarra, Melbourne. After studying at the Melbourne Conservatorium of Music, Maudsley attended the National Gallery of Victoria Art School in Melbourne from 1945 to 1947. During the 1960s, she gained a Graduate Diploma in Fine Art from the Victorian College of the Arts, Melbourne. While studying, Maudsley met (and later married) fellow Australian artist, John Brack (1920–1999). Clara Brack, the oldest of their four daughters, published in 2026 the book The Secret Landscapes: On Not Pleasing Your Mother about her parents.

== Artistic style ==
Maudsley has a distinct personal palette, often described as "subdued". Her work often contains figures, landscapes and buildings that emerge from initially ambiguous graphic constellations. Drawing on the history of Western art, Maudsley includes many symbolic references in her work. For example, the recurring reference to the musical tenor in Maudsley's work connects the non-verbal nature of music with painting. This may be due to her time spent studying at the Melbourne Conservatorium of Music. Her paintings are said to reveal the nuanced personal perspective of how Maudsley experiences the world around her, with the objective of opening up viewer's own worldview.

Maudsley is known for her work in oil on canvas, however prior to 1967 she worked predominantly in gouache, watercolour and ink. This was largely to do with space and time constraints, as she did not have a personal studio in her home while raising four young daughters. In her more recent work, each piece is developed over approximately eight drafts in gouache before the design is transferred to tracing paper, and finally completed with oil on canvas. Because of the abstract and symbolic nature of her work, Maudsley believes that the audience plays an active role in viewing and understanding her art. In a 2018 interview, she explains how she values her audiences putting in effort: "the energy that it takes to try and hear what somebody is saying, that's the virtue... it's not an intellectual thing; it's the act of trying to hear what's being said."

== Exhibitions ==
Maudsley has had solo exhibitions regularly since 1957. Her work is held in a number of public collections, including the British Museum and the National Gallery of Australia, as well as several galleries around Australia including the Art Gallery of South Australia, the Art Gallery of New South Wales, and the National Gallery of Victoria. Her work is also held in numerous private collections.
