= Statue of David Livingstone, Edinburgh =

Statue in Scotland

Statue of David Livingstone
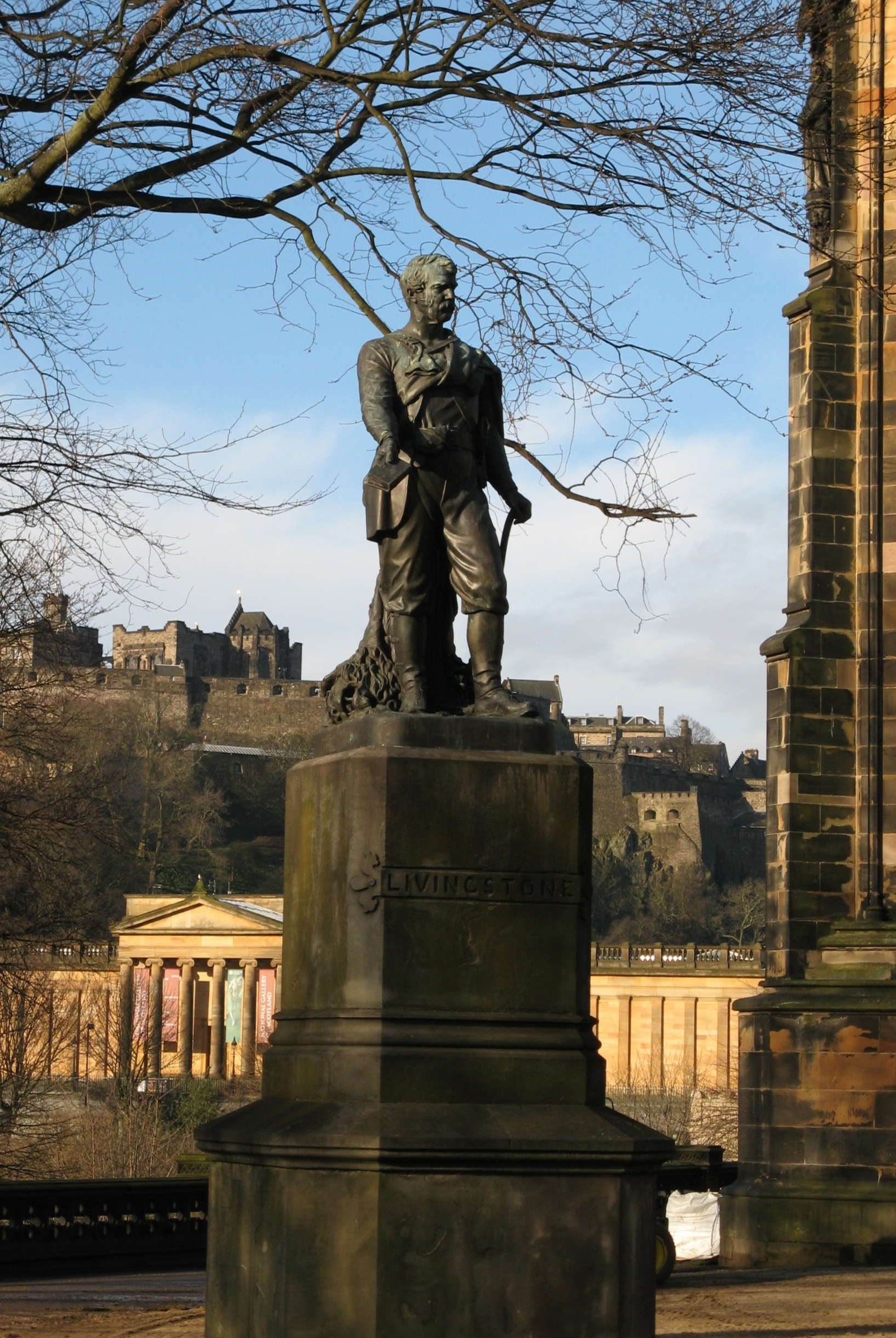
- Artist: Amelia Robertson Hill
- Year: 1876
- Medium: Bronze sculpture
- Location: Edinburgh; 55°57′09″N 3°11′34″W

The statue of David Livingstone in East Princes Street Gardens, Edinburgh, is an 1876 work by Amelia Robertson Hill.

== Description ==
The bronze sculpture depicts David Livingstone wearing a cloak and haversack. He is holding a Bible and has a pistol and compass at his waist. The lion skin represents the time when he survived being attacked by a lion. The statue is next to the Scott Monument.

== History ==
The statue was sculpted by Amelia Robertson Hill between 1875 and 1876 following Livingstone's death in 1873. It was unveiled on 15 August 1876. On 14 December 1970, the sculpture became a listed building and on 19 December 2002 the sculpture's listed status changed from B to A.

== See also ==
- List of public art in Edinburgh
- 1876 in art
