= Two Running Girls =

Painting by John Brack

- Artist: John Brack
- Year: 1959
- Type: oil on composition board
- Dimensions: 41.14 cm × 37.99 cm (16.20 in × 14.96 in)
- Location: Private collection

Two Running Girls is a 1959 painting by Australian artist John Brack. The painting depicts two girls, wearing dresses and with their hair tied, running from the viewer.

The painting was first exhibited in August 1959 at the Antipodeans Exhibition at the Victorian Artists Society galleries in Melbourne.

In May 2016, the painting sold at auction for AUD1.65 million. At a previous sale in 1991, the painting was purchased for AUD52,000.
