= Mariana Cook =

American fine art photographer

Mariana Cook (born 1955) is an American fine art photographer specializing in black and white photography and gelatin silver prints.

Her work has been exhibited in the Metropolitan Museum of Art, the Museum of Modern Art, the J. Paul Getty Museum, the Boston Museum of Fine Arts, the National Portrait Gallery, the Bibliothèque Nationale, and the Musee d'Art Moderne.

She is perhaps best known for her black and white portrait, A Couple in Chicago, which captures a young Barack and Michelle Obama in their 1996 Hyde Park apartment, and the accompanying interview for The New Yorker.

== Work ==
In her 1996 interview with Barack and Michelle Obama, Cook discussed the couple's future political aspirations. At this point in his career, Barack Obama worked as a community organizer and was initiating the launch of his political career in his campaign for Illinois State Senator. The photograph and interview were part of a larger series, Couples: Speaking from the Heart. The article was published in 2009, thirteen years after the original interview and during Obama's presidency. The gelatin silver print is currently housed at the Metropolitan Museum of Art.

== Personal life ==
Cook, the last surviving protégé of Ansel Adams, currently resides in New York City with her husband and daughter.

== Publications ==
- Manhattan Island to My Self (Falcon Press: 1977).
- Fathers and Daughters: In Their Own Words (Chronicle Books: 1994).
- Mothers and Sons: In Their Own Words (Chronicle Books: 1996).
- Generations of Women: In Their Own Words (Chronicle Books: 1998).
- Couples: Speaking from the Heart (Chronicle Books: 2000).
- Faces of Science: Portraits (W. W. Norton: 2005).
- Close at Hand (Quantuck Lane: 2006).
- Mathematicians: An Outer View of the Inner World (Princeton University Press: 2009).
- Stone Walls: Personal Boundaries (Damiani: 2011).
- Justice: Faces of the Human Rights Revolution (Damiani: 2013).
- Lifeline (Ivorypress: 2017).
- Economists (Yale University Press: 2020).
