= Alexander Sokolov (sculptor) =

Sculptor (1955–2022)

Alexander Sokolov (1955–2022) was a direct-carving or taille directe marble sculptor. He spent time working and exhibiting in Ireland, France and Spain, which has led to the distribution of his more central continental style within Iberia. The book Sokolov by the renowned Basque poet and critic Marrodán is to be found at the libraries of the many Spanish universities and Royal Academies of Fine Art.

The sculptor studied and lived in the studios of Miklos Dallos at his outset in Paris in the mid-1970s. Sokolov was seen by Marrodán as emanating from the French school of sculpture and there is a chain of teaching influence through Miklos Dallos and Marcel Gimond back to Antoine Bourdelle and Aristide Maillol. Sokolov, who in French manner elicits response within the bare subject of the torso and the nude, as does Dallos, also has, like Gimond, a strength for portraiture.

That specification of sculpture as tension of force between the under-lying helicoidal axis and superposed rhythm of planes in Sokolov is tempered by the artist's choice to work, free from preparatory modelling, in direct-carving. The modernism of the French school of sculpture developed in modelling but Sokolov's direct-carving is informed by the revolutionary carving influences of Brâncuși and the later Henry Moore. As a portraitist, Sokolov is unusual as working by taille directe, but the helicoidal axis teaching shapes the majority of his large body of work in the human figure and nude. Such movement about the axis would be a continuation of the Italian art termed Mannerist.

Sokolov, who has worked between studios in Ireland and Olula del Rio in Spain, has exhibited seventeen one man shows in European cities.

== Bibliography ==
- Mario Ángel Marrodán, Sokolov: esculturas, La Gran Enciclopedia Vasca, 1993
