= George Sherwood (sculptor) =

American sculptor (born 1954)

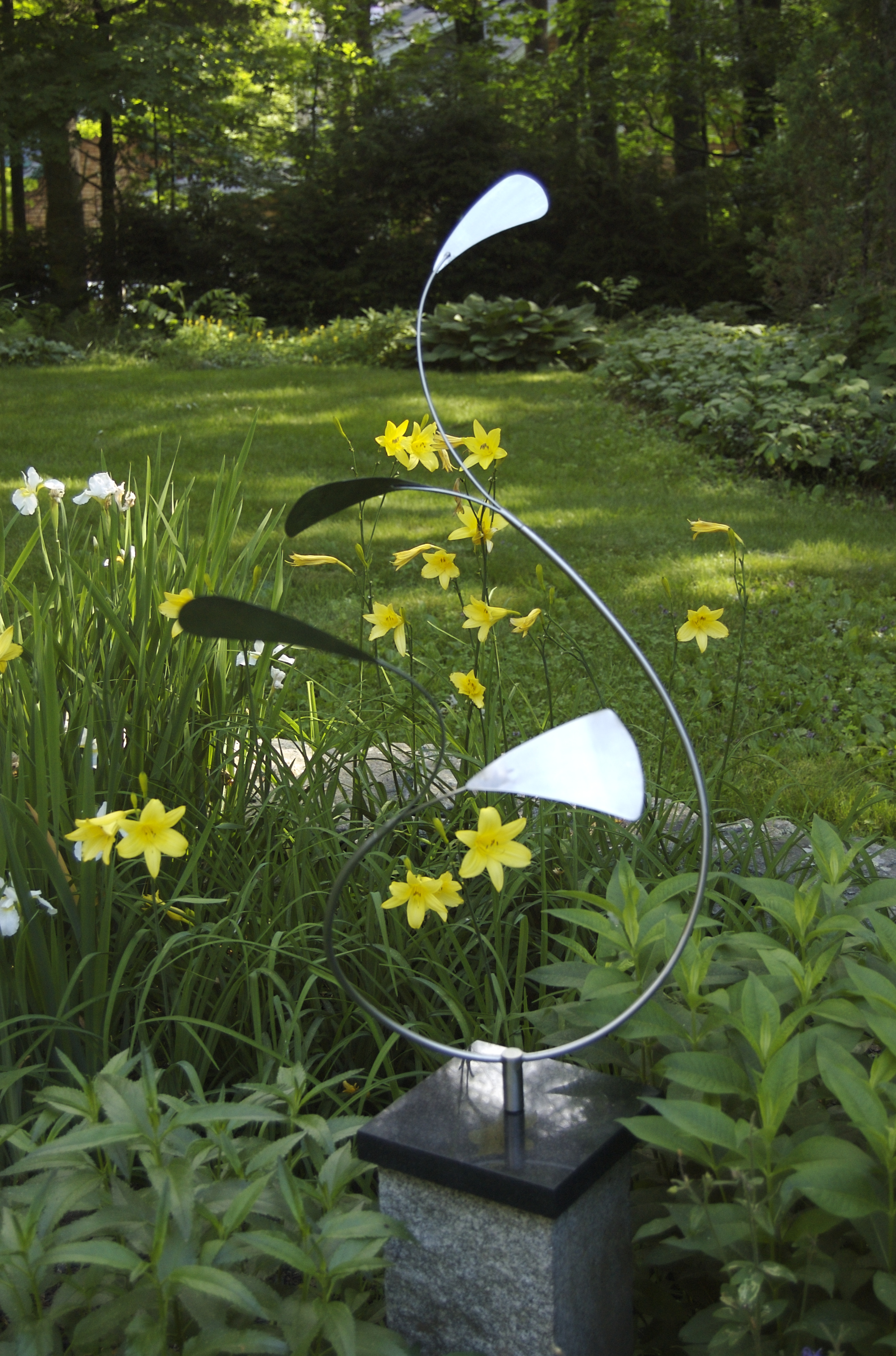
- Wind Orchid is one Sherwood's simpler works
- Born: February 6, 1954 (age 72); Bridgeport, Connecticut
- Education: Hartford Art School
- Alma mater: University of Vermont
- Style: Kinetic and environmental sculpture
- Awards: Lillian Heller award for Contemporary Art

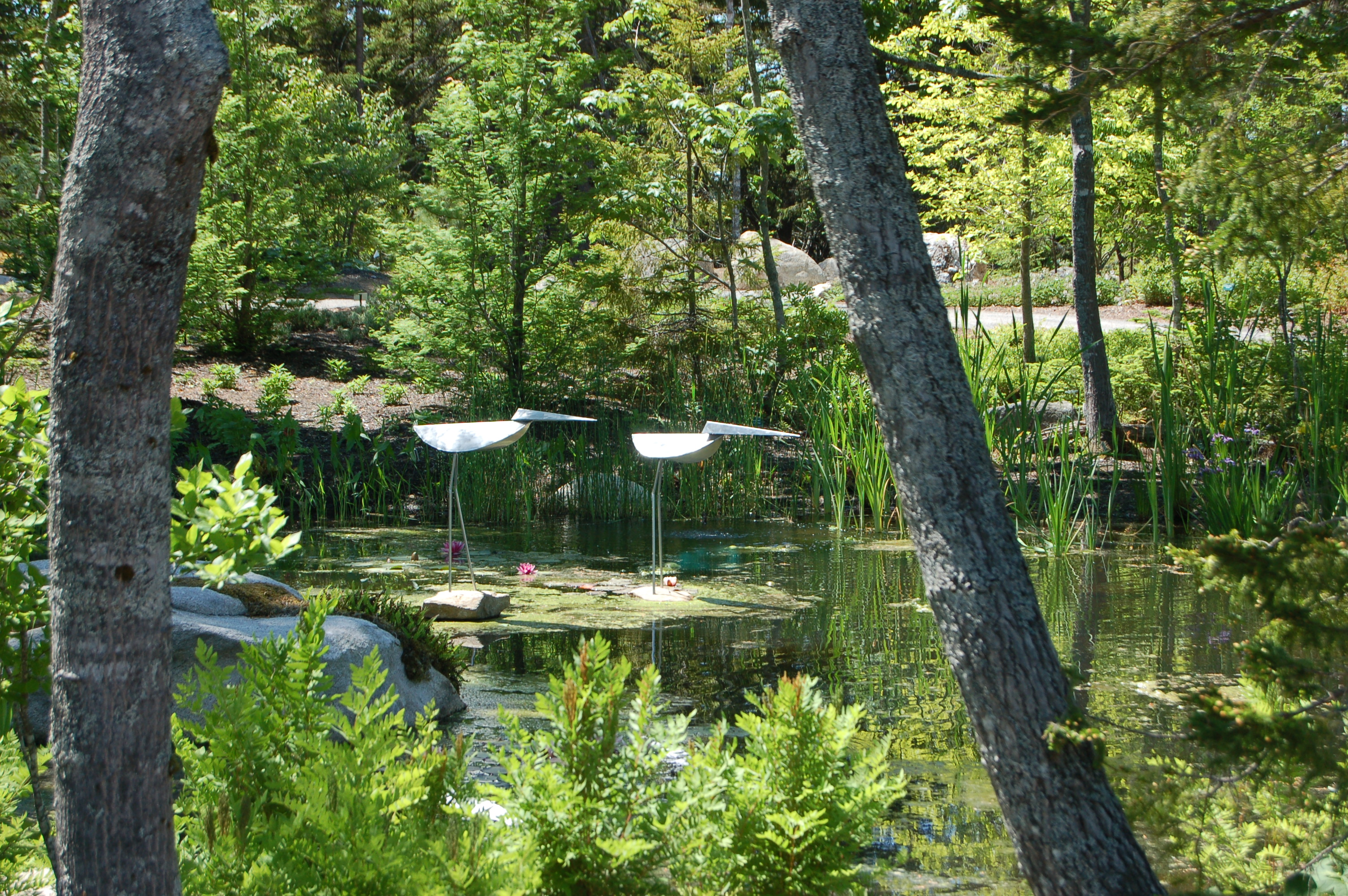
Herons (Roundbelly)

George Sherwood (born February 6, 1954) is an American kinetic and environmental sculptor.

== Biography ==
Sherwood was born on February 6, 1954, in Bridgeport, Connecticut, and grew up in the Connecticut coastal town of Fairfield. As a child, he found inspiration in nature from sailing trips with his father.

In 1976, he was awarded a BFA degree by the Hartford Art School. In the 1970s, he was interested in the art of movement, as practiced by theatrical groups such as Mummenschanz, Pilobolus, and the Celebration Mime Theatre. He developed a theatrical performance animated by humans manipulating large animated props, sculptures, and masks.

In 1984, he earned an engineering degree at the University of Vermont, and then did early work with the MIT Media Lab developing what would become LEGO Mindstorms. During this time, he encountered the wind-powered kinetic sculpture of George Rickey, which inspired him to create his own kinetic artworks.

Sherwood’s sculptures are "based on movement that is both subtle and obvious. At times it appears his sculptures do not move at all, and at other times they are a flurry of activity reminiscent of the tall swaying plumes of late-season cimicfuga in an autumn breeze.” His work is made exclusively of stainless steel, the reflective qualities of which integrate the sculpture into its environment. Wind speed and direction, shades of light, time of day, precipitation, and seasonal color transform the qualities of light and movement. As stated by curator June LaCombe, his sculpture, “exemplifies art for an ecological age". Further, she states, “[Sherwood’s] sculpture celebrates botanical forms and patterns in nature with proportional harmony".

Although most of his best-known sculptures are intended for installation outdoors where they are activated by the wind, Sherwood has begun to create delicate indoors sculptures activated by random air currents.

Sherwood lives and works in Ipswich, Massachusetts. Sherwood is a member of Boston Sculptors Gallery and the Royal Society of British Sculptors.

== Collections and awards ==
Sherwood's work is part of the permanent collection at the Atlanta Botanical Garden (Atlanta, Georgia), the Coastal Maine Botanical Gardens (Boothbay, Maine), the Southern Vermont Art Center (Manchester, Vermont), and the Currier Museum of Art (Manchester, New Hampshire). In 2004, he exhibited at Saint-Gaudens National Historic Site in Cornish, New Hampshire, and in 2009 at the Rose Kennedy Greenway in Boston, Massachusetts. In 2007 he was awarded the Lillian Heller award for Contemporary Art at Chesterwood in Stockbridge, Massachusetts.
