= Abbott Pattison =

American artist

- In studio, carving Wingless Victory in Chicago, Illinois, 1950.
- Born: May 15, 1916; Chicago, Illinois, US
- Died: April 16, 1999 (aged 82)
- Education: Yale College (BA); Yale School of Art (MFA)
- Occupation: Sculptor

Abbott Lawrence Pattison (May 15, 1916 – April 16, 1999) was an American sculptor and abstract artist.

== Life ==
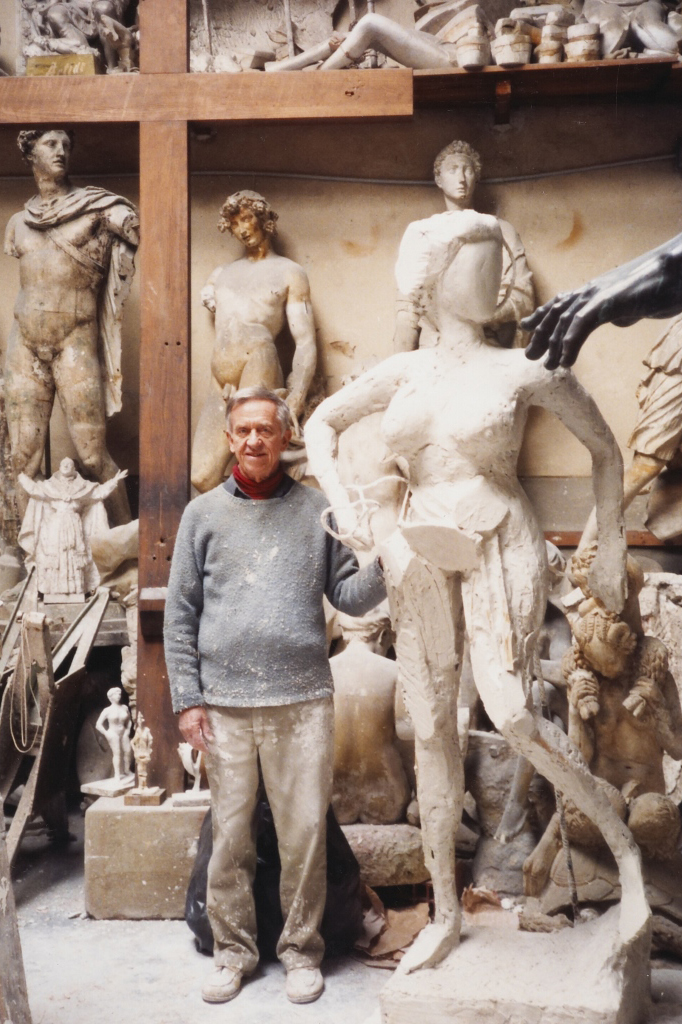
The sculptor working on THE HARVESTING, in The Marinelli Foundry, Firenze, Italy, 1990.

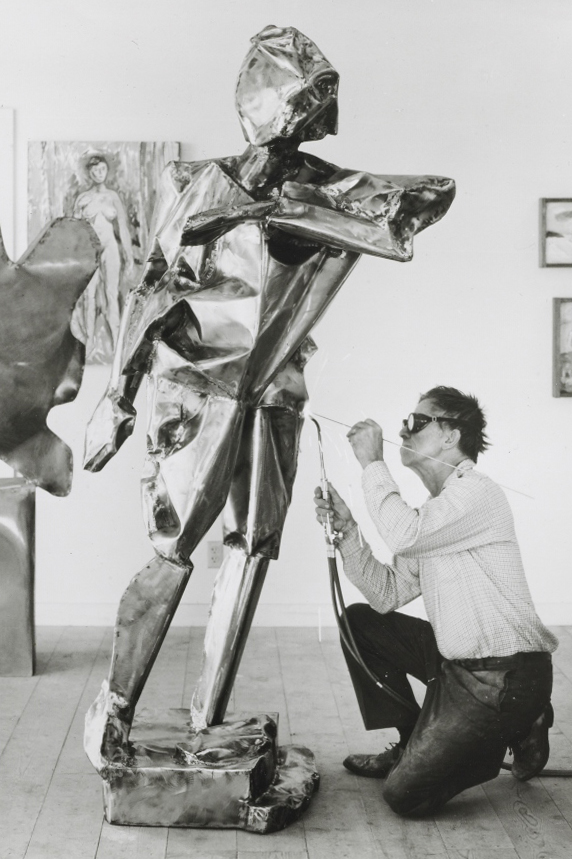
The sculptor welding a steel figure for the Steel Service Center Institute, Cleveland, Ohio, 1986.

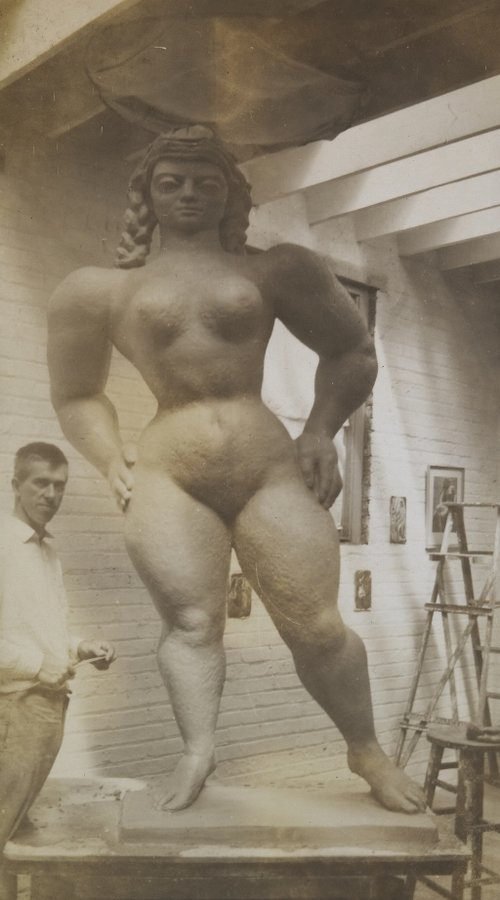
Abbott Pattison working on CARIBBEAN in its clay state before being cast in bronze, 1946.

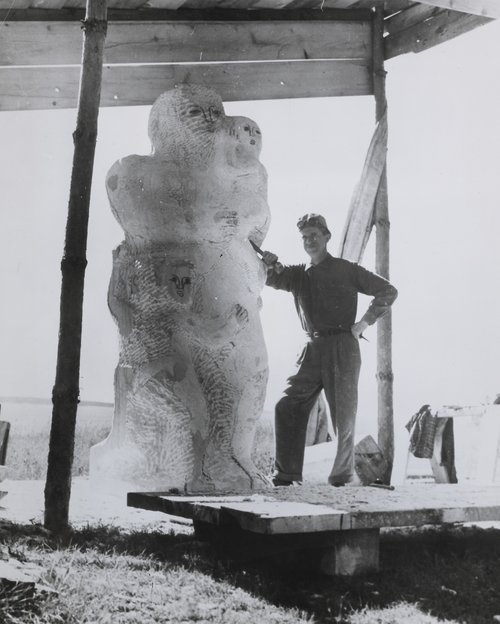
The sculptor carving FAMILY GROUP Lincolnville, Maine, 1958.

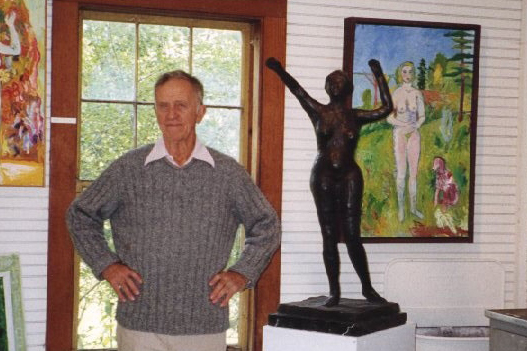
The sculptor in his Lincolnville, Maine studio, 1992.

Internationally known as a sculptor, American artist Abbott Pattison worked primarily in cast bronze, welded brass and carved marble. Recognition of his talent first came in his hometown of Chicago through representation by the Fairweather-Hardin Gallery, but his reputation soon spread nationally, with eight one-man exhibits in New York City at The Downtown Gallery and Edith Halpern Gallery. Later he was also represented in Los Angeles by The Feingarten Gallery, and in London by The Alwin Gallery.

Pattison was born May 15, 1916, to William and Bonnie Pattison, the second of seven children. His father was a well-known real estate developer in the city. He first attended art classes at The Art Institute of Chicago at the age of 10, while a student of Francis Parker School. Later he chose to enroll at Yale University because of their art program. While there, he was thoroughly trained in classical traditions of drawing, fresco painting and the Sienese egg tempera style, eventually choosing sculpture as his primary art form.

After he graduated with a liberal arts degree in 1937, he enrolled in the master's program at Yale. He graduated with a degree in fine arts in 1939. Among the fifty-two students who graduated from the art/architecture department that year, Pattison was awarded first prize, which was a traveling fellowship, and he chose to travel to Northern China and Japan for six months. While in China, he lived in a mountain village 150 miles from Peking with a Franciscan priest who was building a Catholic church in stone quarried from a nearby mountain, Pattison carved Twelve Stations of the Cross for the monastery with the assistance of several local stone masons. Next traveling in Japan, Abbott Pattison was arrested as a spy, but soon released. He warned his interrogators that he would return to Japan, but he would be wearing a uniform the next time.

Upon his return to The United States in 1940, Pattison went directly into Officer's Training School. From 1942 to 1945, he was given active command as captain of a Pacific Command sub chaser, doing convoy duty between Hawaii and the Midway Islands. He was promoted to first executive officer on a destroyer escort, and was thereafter given full command as captain of a second destroyer escort, running convoys across the Pacific from Florida to the African Coast and into the Mediterranean. He won a Military Merit medal for personal bravery, and his ship received battle stars for downing several German fighter planes. Pattison noted that the only regular paycheck he ever received was from that time when he served as an officer in the United States Navy.

At the end of World War II, Pattison returned to Chicago, and to his art, so that by 1946 he was well known in art circles as the youthful recipient of both the Logan and Eisendrath awards, and as a recipient of one of the four prizes awarded nationally to sculptors by The Metropolitan Museum. He joined the faculty of The Art Institute of Chicago as an instructor of sculpture.

I learned one thing during those years at the Institute, you cannot teach sculpture: you can only comment about it. You can show a young student how to acquire the two-percent of sculpture but the rest is up to him….only the talent within can make him a sculptor. And in most cases, only long, hard work over a period of years will unleash all of the potential talent within a man.

— Abbott Pattison, "The Amazons of Abbott Pattison" Interview with Tom Lien, Figure Quarterly 1957

In 1953, Pattison was a visiting sculptor at the University of Georgia, and was asked to return the following year as a sculptor in residence with no teaching duties, having been honored for a second time with the Pauline Palmer Prize for sculpture. At the University, Pattison carved a large marble sculpture, titled Mother and Child and went on to create a 12-foot high abstract horse for the campus in welded plate steel, now called familiarly The Iron Horse. At the time, this sculpture represented the cutting-edge of avant-garde art in the United States. The sculpture was placed in front of the dormitory of the University's football team, and angry students attacked the horse with spray paint, manure, fire and hammers, with the art department professors merely looking on. The Athens, Georgia police force was called in to quell the disturbance. This event became famous as the first official riot on an American college campus, and became the feature of a Public Broadcasting System movie special. The quarter-inch thick boiler plate steel sculpture withstood the attack and remains intact, but it was immediately removed from the campus and has never returned, sitting in a local farmer's field since 1954.

Abbott Pattison regarded all sculptors, presently living or throughout time, as his kin. His work was inspired by classical Classical Greek and Etruscan forms, elements of which he interpreted in creating his abstract bronzes, welded braised figures, and marble carvings.

We sculptors have elements in our work that pass from one generation to another and from one culture to another. We are products of a long history of brotherhood of form and image makers….Things are different now than they were in Michelangelo's time. These days the artist sees things made by the Mayans, Eskimos, and Hindus—things from all over the earth. Today the panorama is different: now there is an amalgam of viewpoints. It's not just more complicated for the viewer but for the artist as well. Envy the Greek who was pulling himself out of ignorance and lack of skills—and each one working in a similar vein. The same is true for the Egyptians, Mayans, and Chinese. And then all of a sudden the whole panoply of centuries of art spread before our eyes in books and museums and we have to be aware of all of these forms of expression. Yes I have been eclectic in my own work. We artists can't help but admire so much, the artworks of the past and incorporate them into our own work.

— Abbott Pattison, Interview with Barbara Joyce, Winnetka Historical Society Gazette, March 1998

Prior to attending Yale, Pattison did more drawing and painting than sculpture. It was at Yale that he decided to work mostly in sculpture. However, he often exhibited his paintings, watercolors and terra cotta sculptures alongside his bronze sculptures at gallery shows.

I can go back and forth from painting to sculpture easily. They supplement one another; some of the greatest sculptors have done important paintings. I always have my sketchbooks with me. I draw every day. I have filled over one hundred books with drawings of all kinds of things. They are filled with my thoughts, ideas, and observations.

— Abbott Pattison, "The Protean Spirit", Interview with John Chandler and Bruce Brown, Maine Coast Artists, May 1997

Shortly before his death in 1999, Pattison advised his artist son Harry: "If an artist can manage to paint four or five great paintings in a lifetime that's all that is necessary. It isn't easy."

Abbott Pattison spent his summers at his home and studio on the coast of Maine, occasionally teaching at The Skowhegan School of Painting and Sculpture, where he also served on their Board of Governors. He spent his winters in Florence, Italy where the bronze foundry that cast his works is located. The rest of his time he worked in his Chicago studio, occasionally teaching at the Art Institute of Chicago. He continued working to the day of his death at age 82.

Currently more than thirty of Pattison's works are on public display throughout Chicago, and his sculptures are in the collections of universities, corporations and museums worldwide, including the Whitney Museum in New York City, the Art Institute of Chicago, the Corcoran Museum in Washington, D.C., the San Francisco Museum and the Museum of the Israeli State in Jerusalem. Five of his pieces are owned by the United States State Department and are located in embassies overseas. One of Abbott Pattison's sculptures is in Buckingham Palace, London.

== Education and experience ==
- Graduate of Yale College, 1937 B.A.
- Yale School of Art, 1939 M.F.A.
- Lived and worked in China and Japan, 1940
- US Navy, 1942-45, captain of a destroyer escort and PC-461-class submarine chaser
- Instructor Art Institute School, 1946-52
- Worked in France, 1950-51
- Visiting Sculptor, University of Georgia, 1953
- Sculptor in Residence, University of Georgia, 1954
- Teacher of Sculpture, Skowhegan Summer Art School, 1955-56
- Worked in Florence, Italy 1955-56 and frequently thereafter

== Exhibitions ==
- Art Institute of Chicago
- Metropolitan Museum
- Whitney Museum
- Pennsylvania Academy
- Oakland Museum
- Univ. of Notre Dame
- Birmingham Museum
- San Francisco Museum
- Cali. Palace of the Legion of Honor
- Cincinnati Museum
- Elmhurst Art Museum, Illinois
- Feingarten Galleries, Los Angeles
- Fairweather-Hardin Gallery, Chicago
- Wellfleet Art Gallery
- Georgia State Museum
- Univ. of Miami
- Univ. of Pittsburgh
- Bates College
- Colby College
- 8 One-man shows in New York City (formerly represented by Downtown Gallery)

== Prizes ==
- 1939 First Travelling Fellowship, Yale Univ.
- 1942 Logan Prize, Art Institute of Chicago
- 1946 Eisendrath Prize, Art Institute of Chicago
- 1950 and 1953 Pauline Palmer Prize (sculpture), Art Institute of Chicago
- 1951 Metropolitan Museum $1500 Award in 1st Contemporary American Sculpture Show
- 1963 Prize International Sculpture Show, Bundy Museum, Vermont
- 1968 Clussman Prize: Art Institute of Chicago
- And others

== Permanent museum collections ==
- Whitney Museum
- Art Institute of Chicago
- Israeli State Museum
- Chrysler Museum
- Portland Museum
- Corcoran Museum
- San Francisco Museum
- California Palace of the Legion of Honor
- Addison Gallery, American Art
- St. Louis Museum
- Georgia Museum of Art at University of Georgia
- Phoenix Museum
- St. Paul Art Center
- La Jolla Art Center
- Evansville, Indiana Museum
- Davenport Museum
- Davenport Museum of Fine Arts
- Palm Springs Desert Museum
- Wichita Museum
- Flint Institute of Arts
- Farnsworth Museum

== Artworks ==
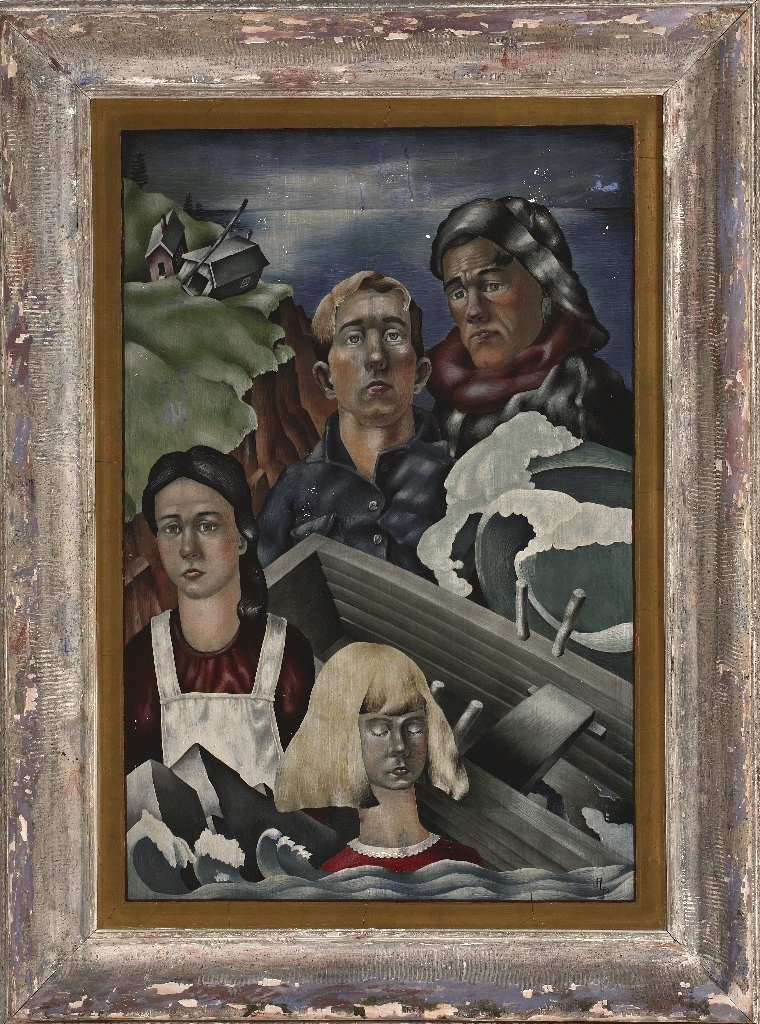
BORN TO THE SEA, 1937. 26” x 28” egg tempera. Created at Yale University. Collection: Harry Pattison.

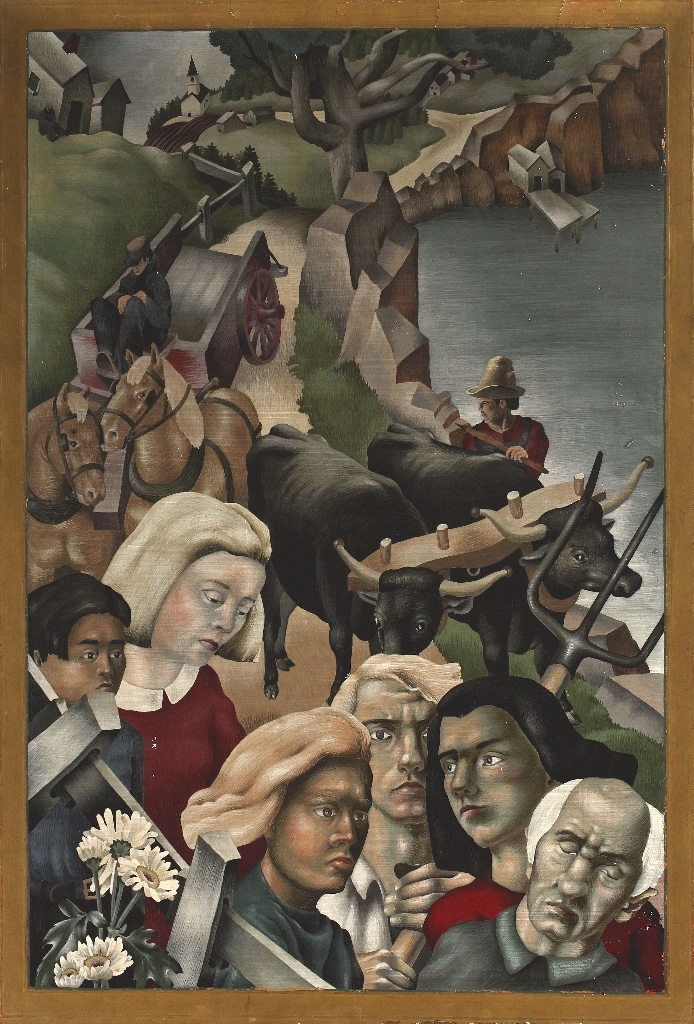
FAMILY OF MAN, 1937. 32” x 22” egg tempera. Created at Yale University. Collection: Harry Pattison.

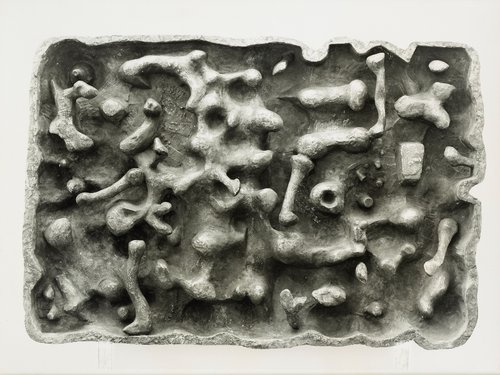
ALLEGHENY Bronze bas relief. 54” x 76”. Collection of The Whitney Museum, NYC.

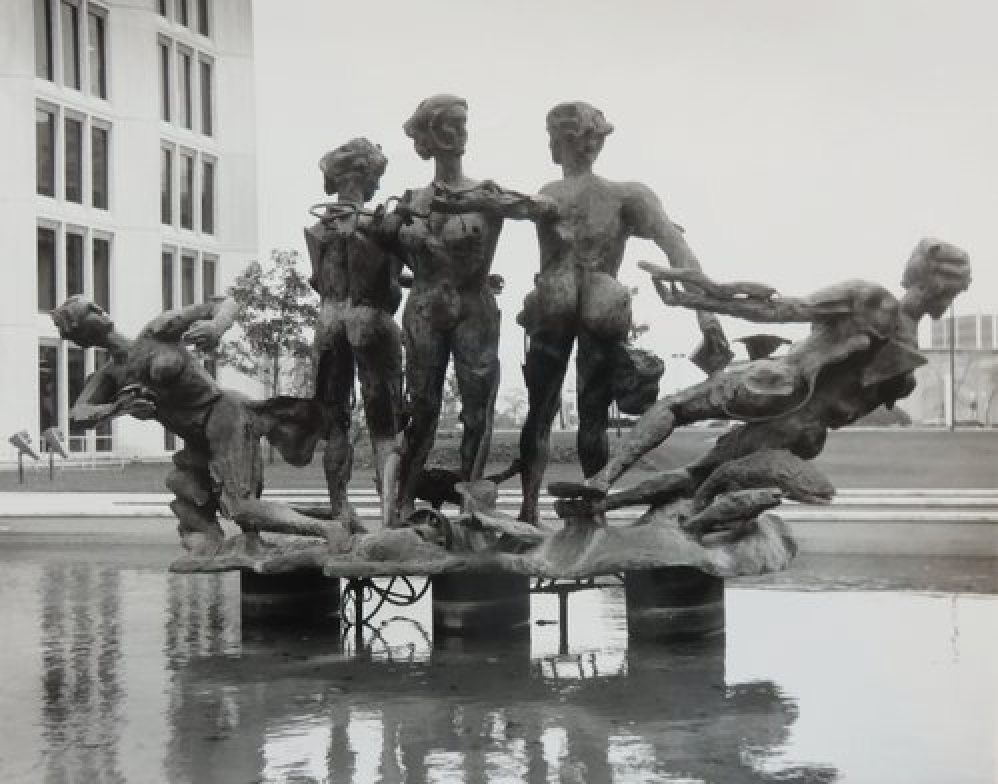
FOUNTAIN OF THE GREAT LAKES, Oak Brook, Illinois.

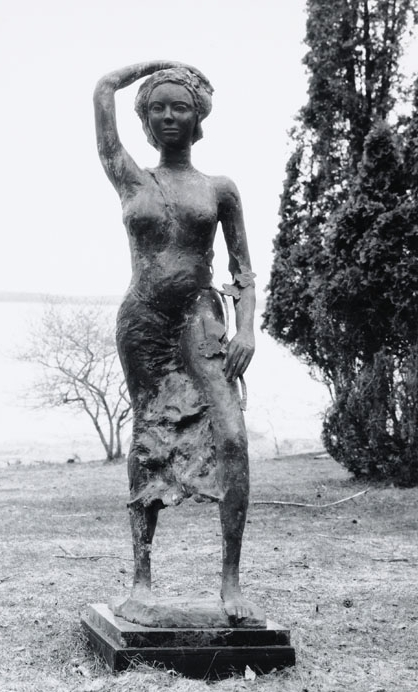
MARY AT THE PENOBSCOT, 72" bronze. Private Collection: Seattle, Washington.

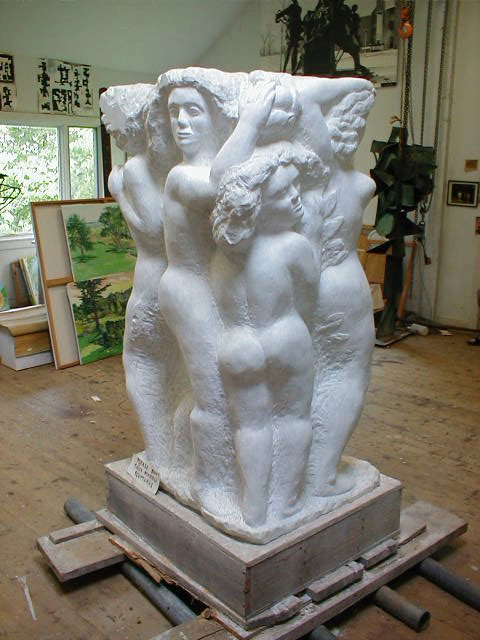
THE CARYATIDS, carved 1997. 68” high, Carrara marble. Gifted to The Evansville Museum, Evansville, Indiana.

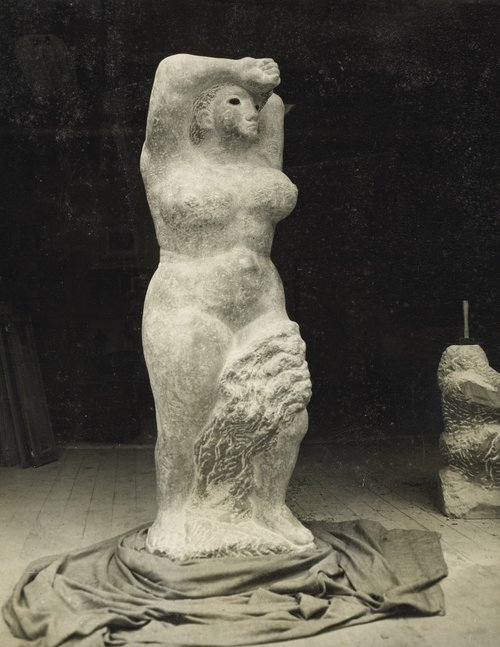
WINGLESS VICTORY, carved Tennessee marble, 1950. Awarded the First Pauline Palmer Prize, The Art Institute of Chicago. Private collection.

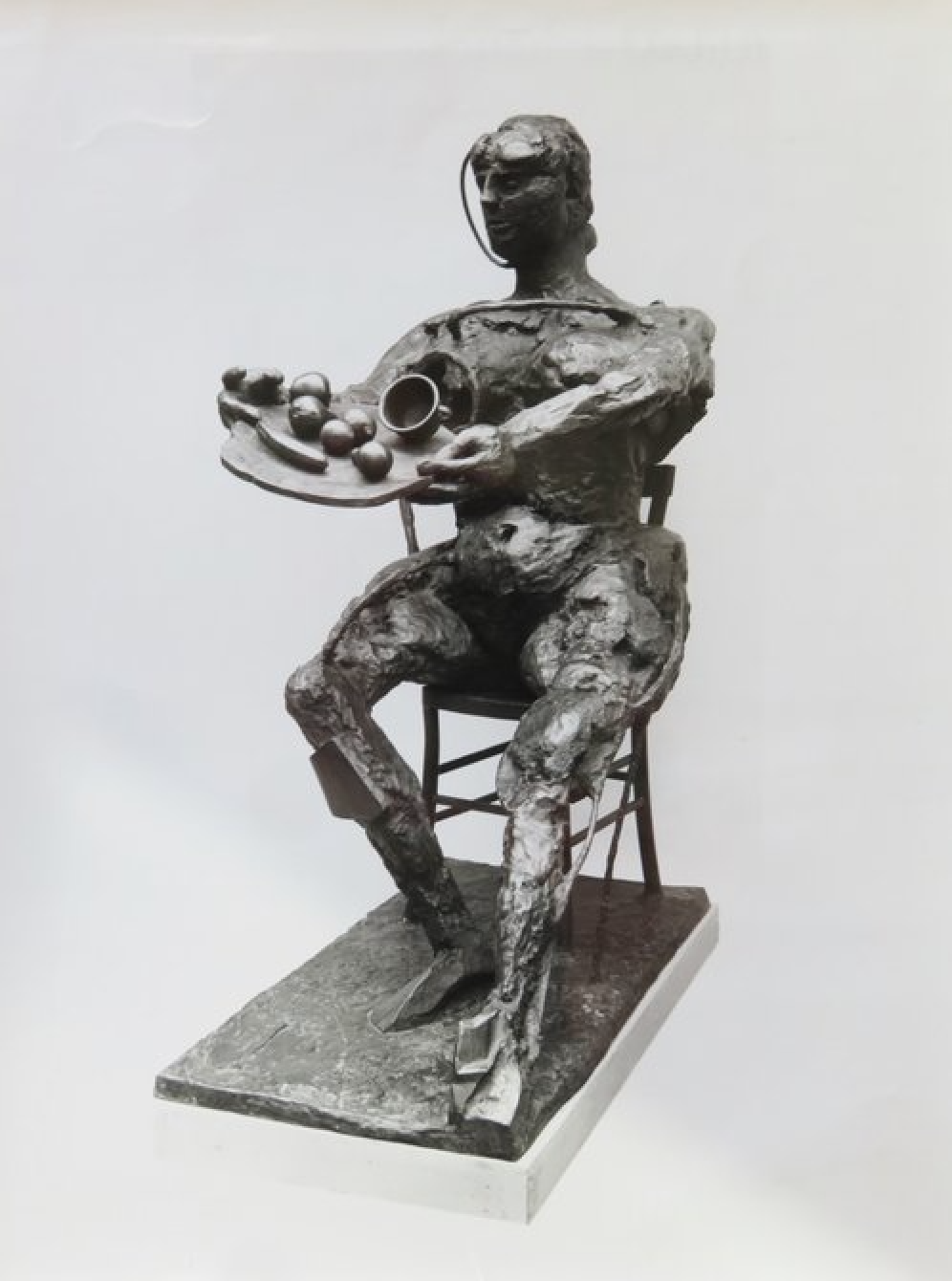
WOMAN PRESENTING A FEAST TO THE WORLD, 70” high. Collection: Leigh Block, Chicago, Illinois,

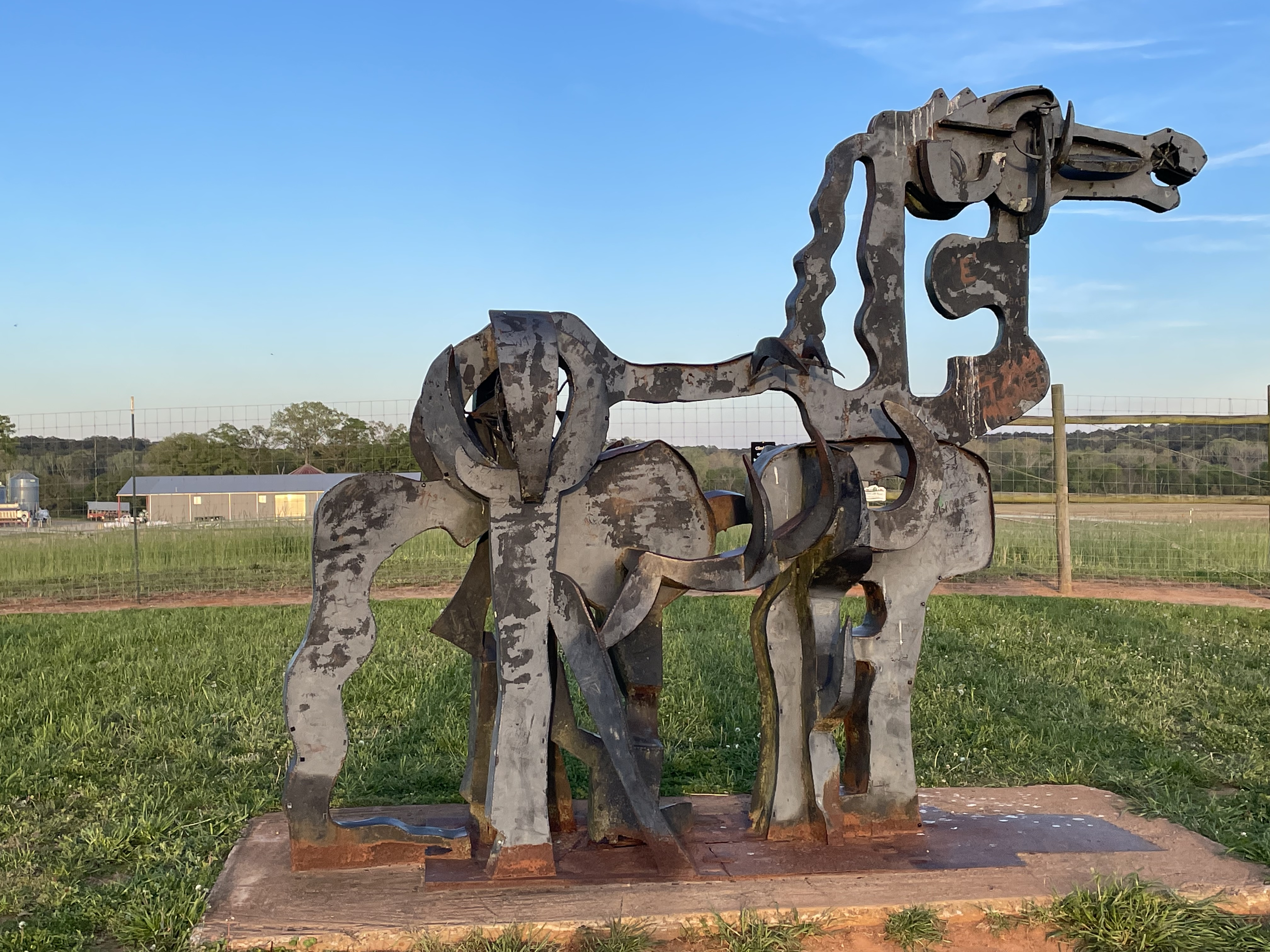
IRON HORSE in Watkinsville, Georgia

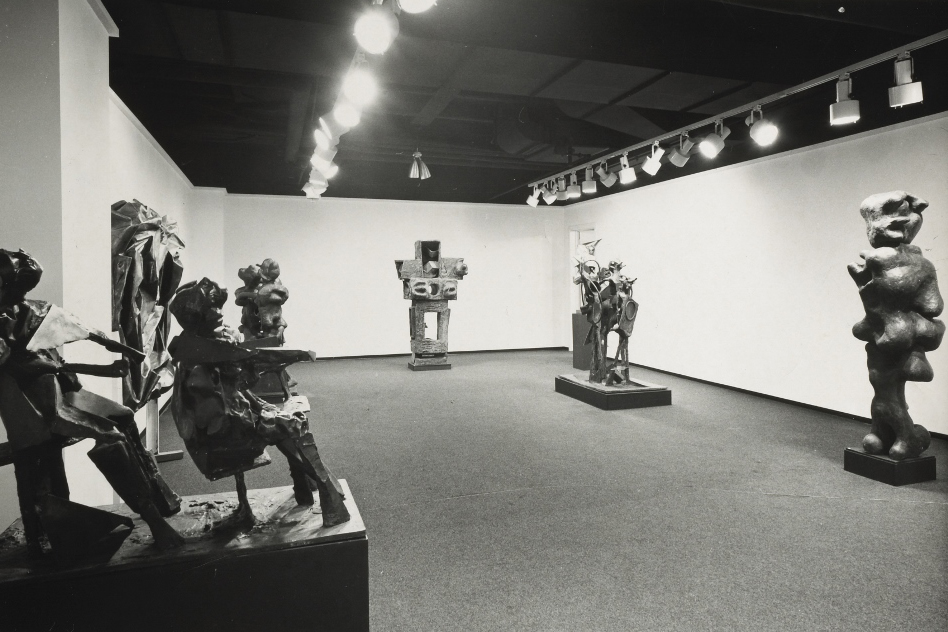
Fairweather-Hardin Gallery Show. Chicago, 1970.

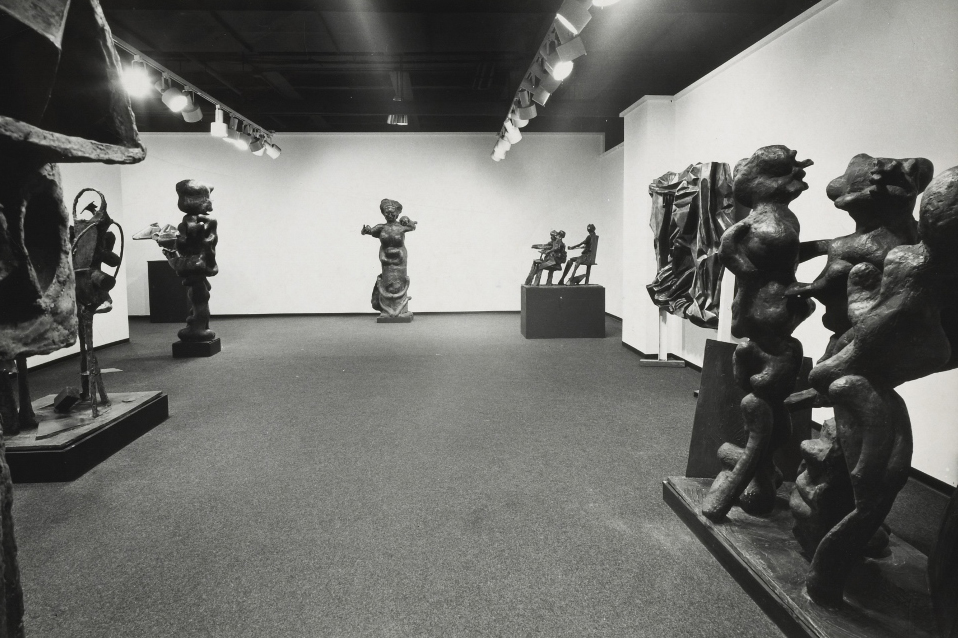
Fairweather-Hardin Gallery Show. Chicago, 1970.

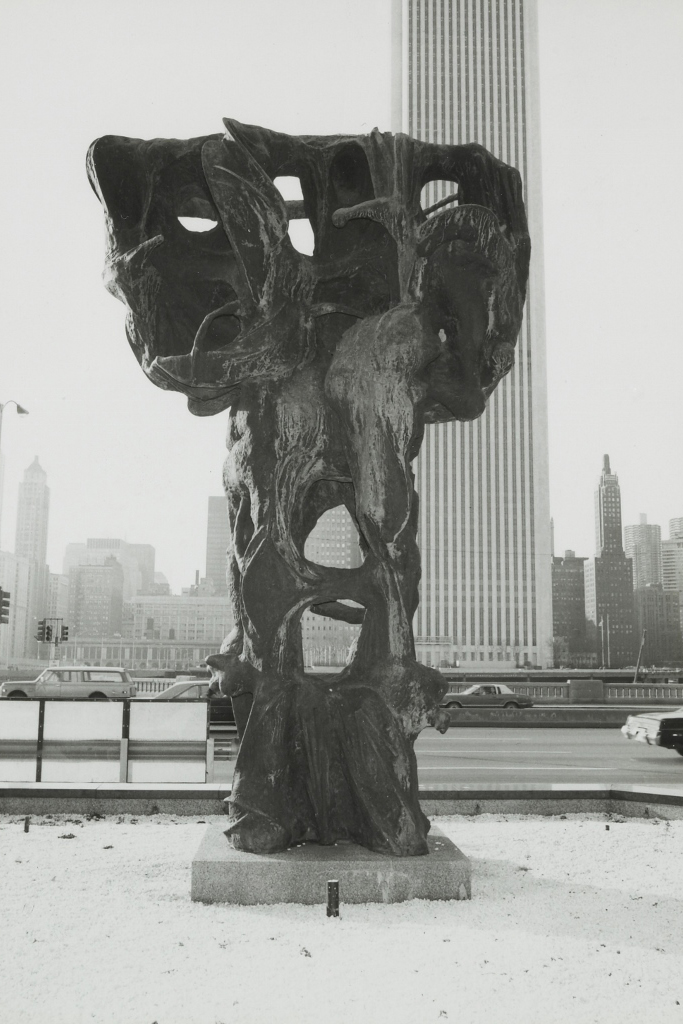
CITY TOTEM, collection location on Lake Shore Drive. Chicago, Illinois.
