= The Bar (painting) =

Painting by John Brack

- Artist: John Brack
- Year: 1954
- Medium: oil on canvas
- Dimensions: 96.4 cm × 140.0 cm (38.0 in × 55.1 in)
- Location: National Gallery of Victoria, Melbourne
- Website: ngv.vic.gov.au

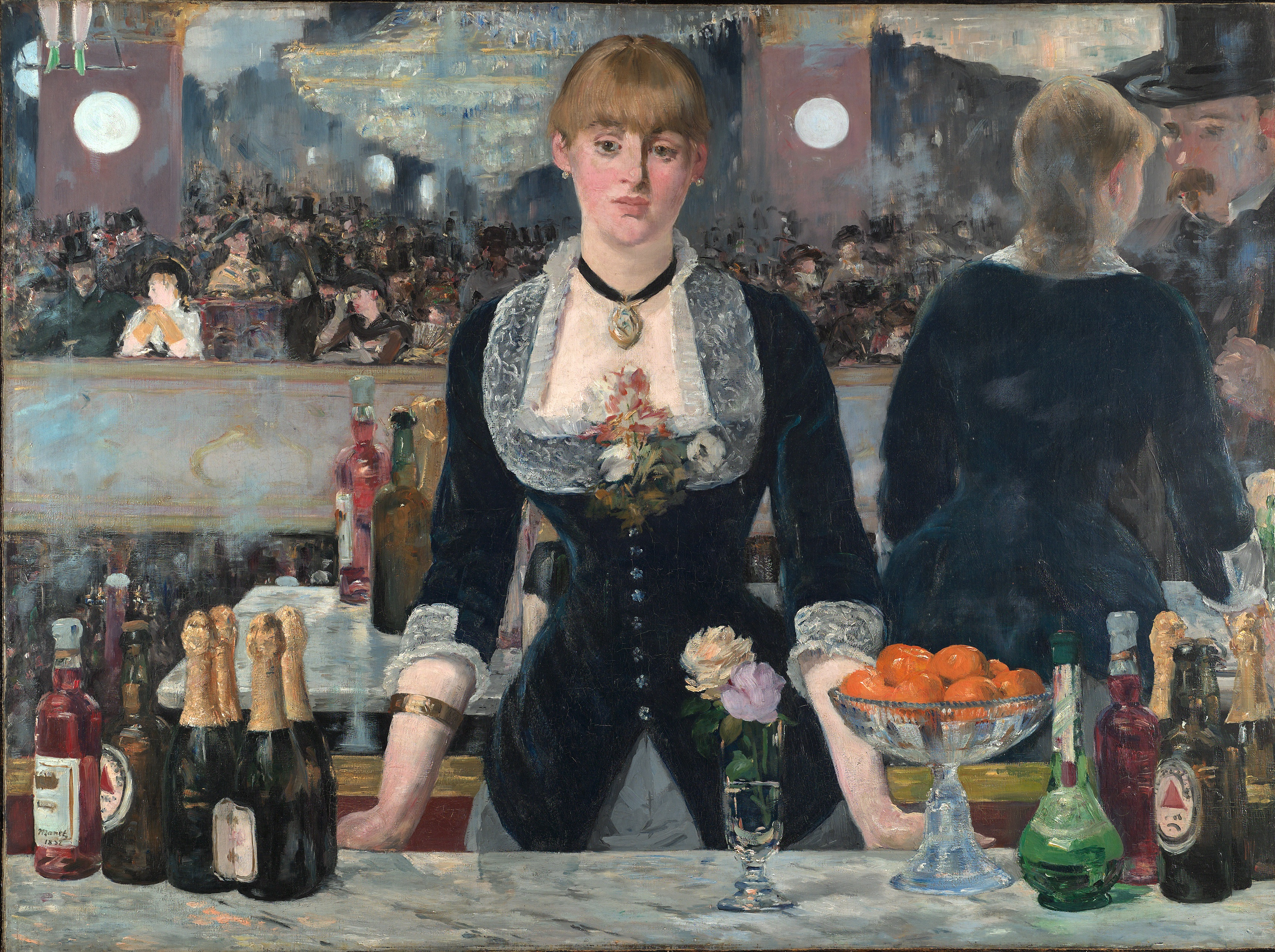
A Bar at the Folies-Bergère (1882) by Édouard Manet.

The Bar is a 1954 painting by Australian artist John Brack. The subject of the painting directly references Édouard Manet's 1882 work A Bar at the Folies-Bergère. It depicts a barmaid working in an Australian pub at the time of the "six o'clock swill". As in Manet's work, the patrons of the bar are shown in a reflection behind the barmaid. The work is considered a companion piece to Brack's 1955 work Collins St., 5 pm.

A Melbourne art collector acquired The Bar for 90 guineas in 1954. In 2006, the painting sold for $3.12m, a then record price for an Australian artwork at auction. The anonymous buyer was later revealed to be David Walsh, owner of the Museum of Old and New Art in Hobart. He sold the painting to the National Gallery of Victoria (NGV) for the same price in 2009.

The Bar, along with Brack's Collins St., 5 pm, is considered a highlight of the NGV's Australian art collection, and is on permanent display at the Ian Potter Centre in Melbourne's Federation Square.
