= James Wilson Alexander MacDonald =

American sculptor

- Born: August 25, 1824; Steubenville, Ohio, U.S.
- Died: August 14, 1908 (aged 83); Yonkers, New York, U.S.
- Occupation: Sculptor

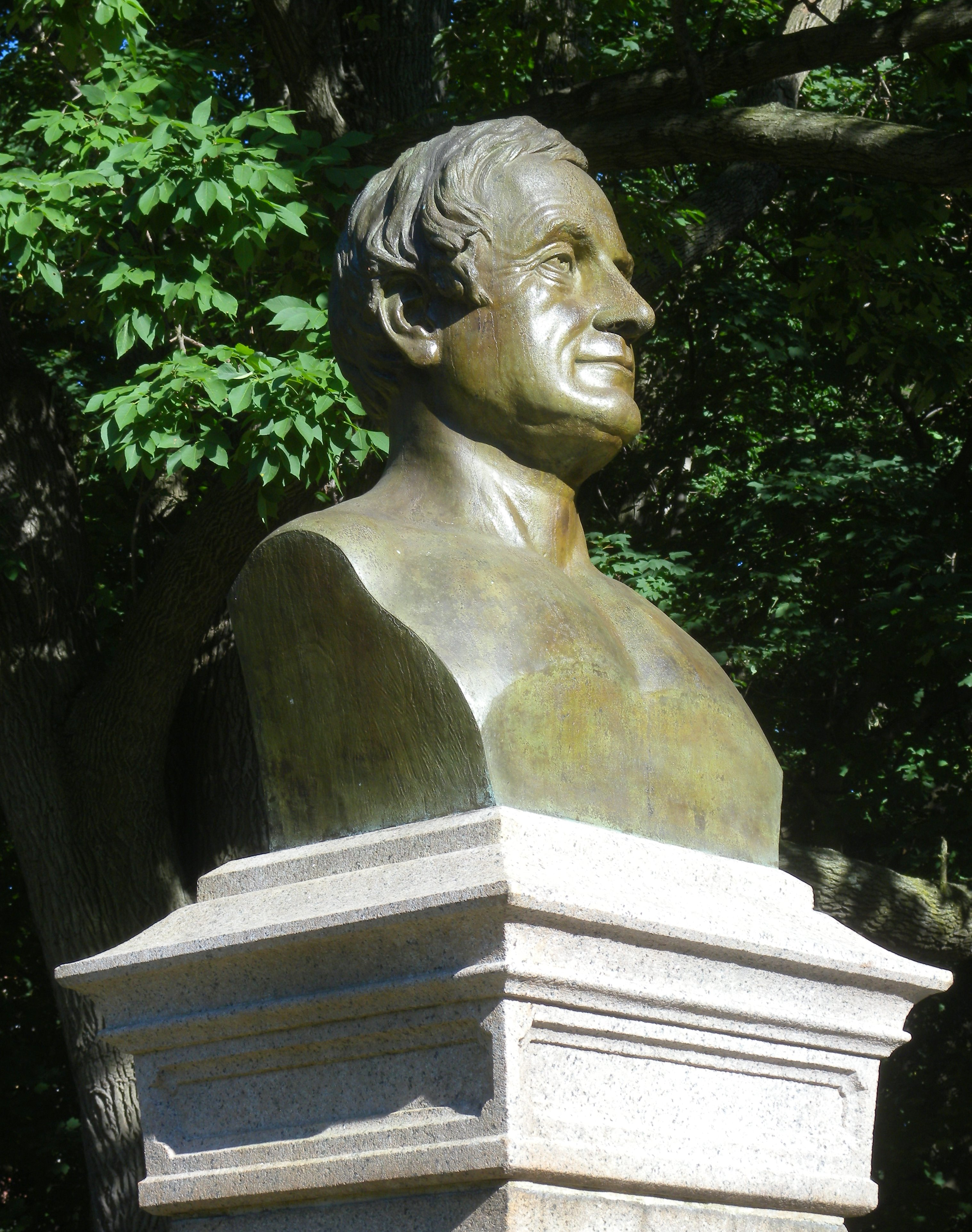
Bust of Washington Irving by MacDonald.

James Wilson Alexander MacDonald (August 25, 1824 - August 14, 1908) was an American sculptor.

== Life ==
MacDonald was born on August 25, 1824, in Steubenville, Ohio. He began his career in publishing as a clerk in St. Louis, Missouri in 1841, but quit shortly after to dedicate himself to sculpture.

MacDonald designed many busts, some of which were installed in courthouses and public parks. Among his subjects were Senator Thomas Hart Benton, Congressman Charles O'Connor, and Ambassador Washington Irving. MacDonald became known as "America's oldest sculptor."

MacDonald died of paralysis on August 14, 1908, in Yonkers, New York, at age 84.
