= Collins St., 5 pm =

Painting by John Brack

- Artist: John Brack
- Year: 1955
- Medium: oil on canvas
- Dimensions: 114.6 cm × 162.9 cm (45.1 in × 64.1 in)
- Location: National Gallery of Victoria, Melbourne
- Website: ngv.vic.gov.au

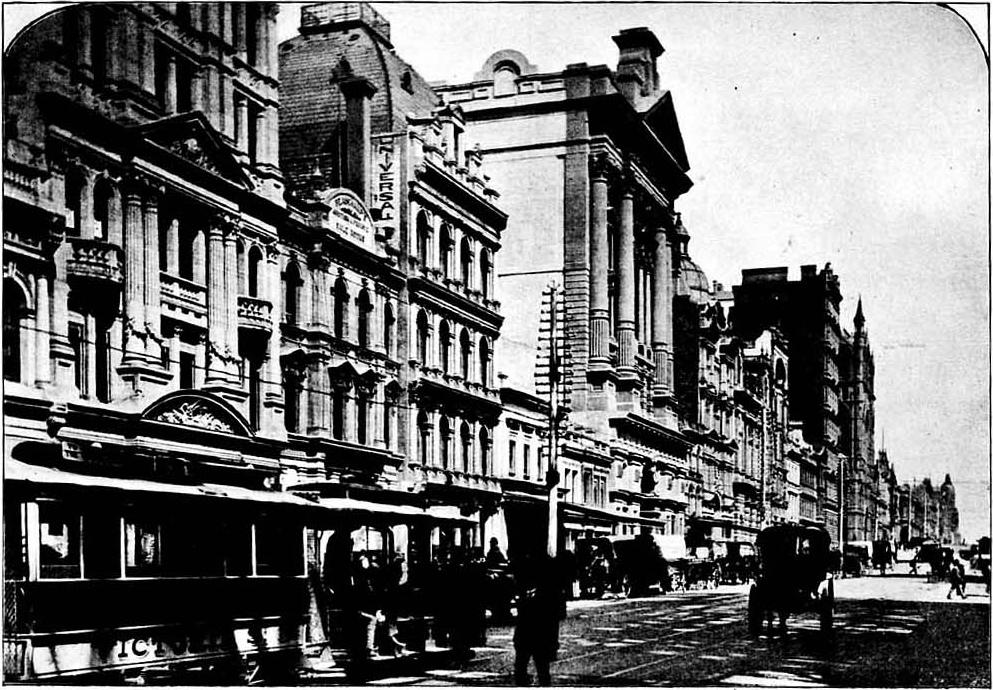
Collins Street in 1903; most of the building in the foreground still existed in 1955.

Collins St., 5 pm is a 1955 painting by Australian artist John Brack. The painting depicts office workers walking along busy Collins Street in Melbourne after finishing work for the day—"Blank-faced office workers hurry by like sleep-walkers, thinking only of the pubs or their homes in the suburbs". Brack conceived the work after reading T. S. Eliot's 1922 poem The Waste Land. It is considered a companion piece to Brack's earlier work The Bar.

The painting was purchased from Peter Bray Gallery for the National Gallery of Victoria's permanent Australian art collection and is exhibited in the Ian Potter Centre in Federation Square in Melbourne.

Looking back on his iconic picture ... Brack found it to be "totally unsatisfactory", because of the condescending attitude he adopted in relation to the people in the street. "I should have known", he said, "that their lives were just as complex as mine, if not more so."

— Art critic John McDonald,

In 2011, Collins St., 5 pm was voted the most popular work in the collection of the National Gallery of Victoria.
