= John Brack =

Australian artist (1920–1999)

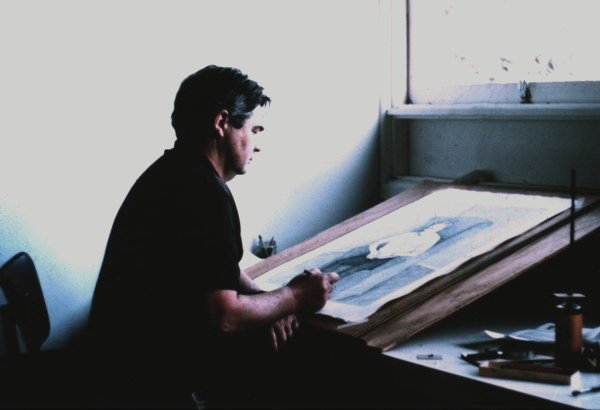
- Brack working on the portrait of J. R. McLeod circa 1971
- Born: Cecil John Brack; 10 May 1920; South Melbourne, Victoria, Australia
- Died: 11 February 1999 (aged 78); Hawthorn East, Victoria, Australia
- Education: Box Hill High School; National Gallery of Victoria Art School
- Known for: Painting, drawing, printmaking
- Notable work: The Bar (1954); Collins St., 5 pm (1955); The Car (1955); The New House (1957)
- Movement: Antipodeans
- Spouse: Helen Maudsley

Cecil John Brack (10 May 1920 – 11 February 1999) was an Australian painter, and a member of the Antipodeans group. According to one critic, Brack's early works captured the idiosyncrasies of their time "more powerfully and succinctly than any Australian artist before or since. Brack forged the iconography of a decade on canvas as sharply as Barry Humphries did on stage."

== Early life ==
Brack was born on 10 May 1920 in the Melbourne suburb of South Melbourne. Brack's father was Cecil William Brack who worked as a printer and his mother was Edith May, both who were Victorian born. Brack excelled at his studies and was awarded a scholarship to Ivanhoe Grammar School. However, Brack was prohibited from entering because his parents were not able to afford the uniform leading to Brack attending Box Hill High School. Having obtained his intermediate certificate in 1936, Brack left Box Hill High School and found work as a clerk at the Victorian Insurance Co. Ltd, Collins Street. In 1938, Brack started to attend night classes at the National Gallery of Victoria Art School which was under the painter Charles Wheeler and spent several evenings at the State Library Victoria.

== Life ==
During World War 2 (1940–1946) VX107527 Lieutenant John Brack served with the Field Artillery. Brack was Art Master at Melbourne Grammar School (1952–1962). His art first achieved prominence in the 1950s. He also joined the Antipodeans group in the 1950s which protested against abstract expressionism. He was appointed Head of National Gallery of Victoria Art School (1962–1968), where he was an influence on many artists and the creation of the expanded school attached to the new gallery building.

Brack was married to artist Helen Maudsley. Clara Brack, the oldest of their four daughters, published in 2026 the book The Secret Landscapes: On Not Pleasing Your Mother about her parents.

== Style ==
Brack's early conventional style evolved into one of simplified, almost stark, shapes and areas of deliberately drab colour, often featuring large areas of brown. He made an initial mark in the 1950s with works on the contemporary Australian culture, such as the iconic Collins St., 5 pm (1955), a view of rush hour in post-war Melbourne. Set in a bleak palette of browns and greys, it was a comment on the conformity of everyday life, with all figures looking almost identical. A related painting, The Bar (1954), was modelled on Manet's 1882 A Bar at the Folies-Bergère, and satirised the six o'clock swill, a social ritual arising from the early closing of Australian pubs. Most of these early paintings and drawings were unmistakably satirical comments against the Australian Dream, either being set in the newly expanding post-war suburbia or taking the life of those who lived there as their subject matter.

In the 1970s, Brack produced a long series of highly stylised works featuring objects such as pencils in complex patterns. These were intended as allegories of contemporary life.

== Period and themes ==
Brack's works cover a wide range topics and themes. He often did a series of works on a particular theme over a number of years. His portraits, including self-portraits, and portraits of family, friends and commissions, and his paintings of nudes were produced throughout his career.

- War time drawings (1943–1945)
- Scenes of urban life (shops, street scenes etc.) (1952–)
- Racecourse (1953–1956)
- School, the playground (1959–1960)
- Wedding (1960–1961)
- Shop windows (1963–1977)
- Ballroom dancers (1969)
- Gymnastics (1971–1973)
- Postcards and implements (1976–)
- Pencils and pens (1981–)
- Mannequins (1989–1990)

The Art of John Brack by Sasha Grishin includes a catalogue raisonné of his work to 1990. The catalogue for the exhibition at Heide Museum of Modern Art in 2000 includes works to 1994.

== Exhibitions and auctions ==
A major retrospective exhibition of Brack's work was held at the National Portrait Gallery in Canberra from 24 August 2007 to 18 November 2007; it was the last major exhibition at the Old Parliament House before the gallery was relocated. Brack's widow, Helen Maudsley, an artist in her own right, attended the opening and commented that Brack was not concerned with the social standing of the sitter, but rather the artistic merit of their participation in the piece.

Brack's painting The Bar sold for $3.2 million in April 2006, while in May 2007 his painting The Old Time sold for $3.36 million at auction in Sydney, a record for a painting by an Australian artist.

- 2020 Laughing Child (1958) was scheduled for auction in Sydney on 24 June 2020. It is a portrait of the artist's daughter Charlotte, aged four, and is described as "one of Australian art's most compelling representations of childhood".
- 2009 John Brack: Retrospective Exhibition, Ian Potter Centre: NGV Australia
- 2006–2007 The Nude in the Art of John Brack, MacClelland Gallery and Sculpture Park, Langwarrin, Melbourne
- 1999 John Brack – Inside and Outside, works in the N.G.A. collection, National Gallery of Australia, Canberra
- 1998 John Brack and Fred Williams, Art Gallery of South Australia, Adelaide
- 1987–88 John Brack – A Retrospective, National Gallery of Victoria, Melbourne
- 1981 Drawings, 1945–79, Monash University Gallery, Melbourne
- 1977 Paintings and Drawings, 1945–77, Australian National University
- 1977 Selected Paintings, 1947–77, Royal Melbourne Institute of Technology Gallery, Melbourne

== See also ==
- Australian art
