= Convalescence =

Recovery after illness or injury

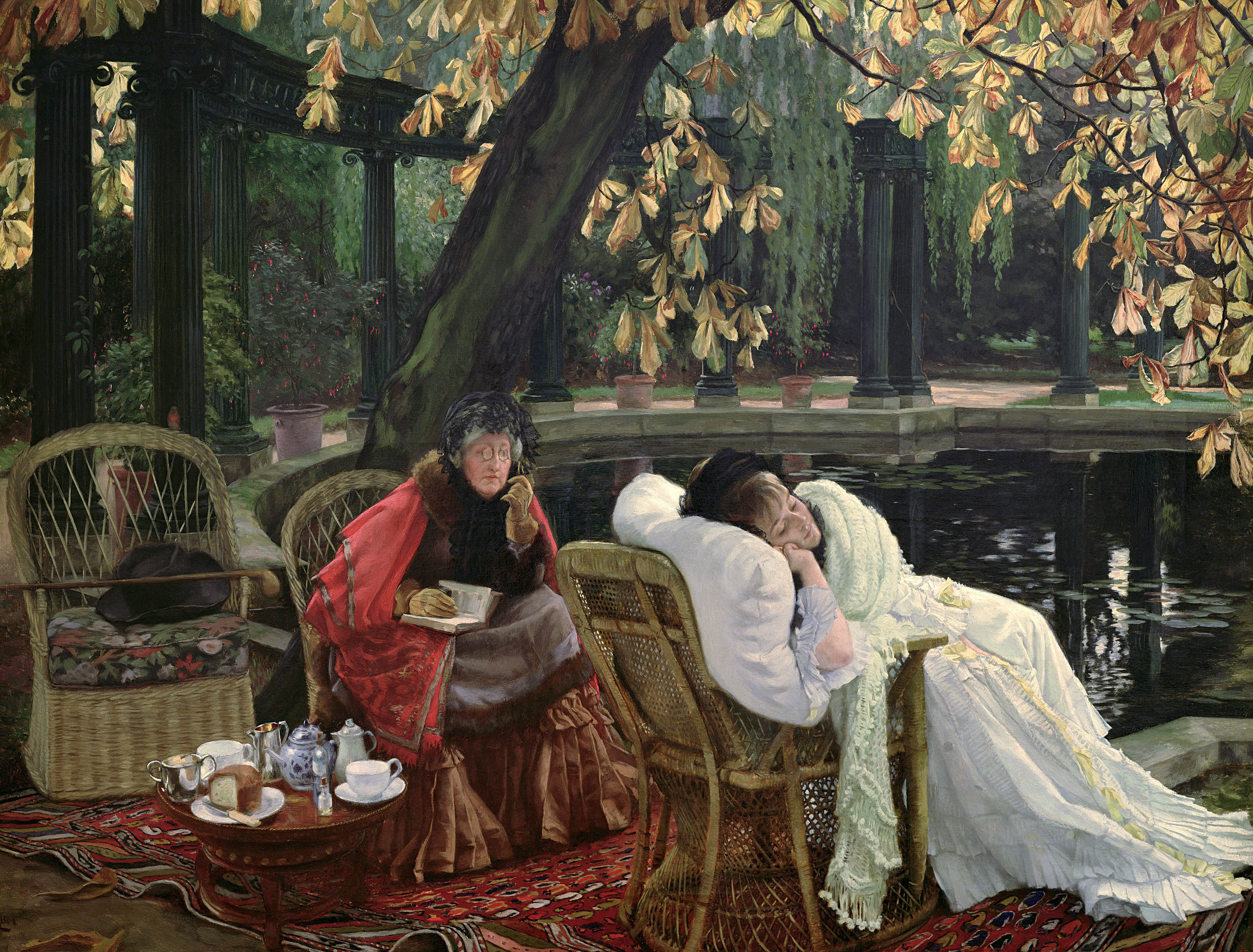
The Convalescent by James Tissot, 1876

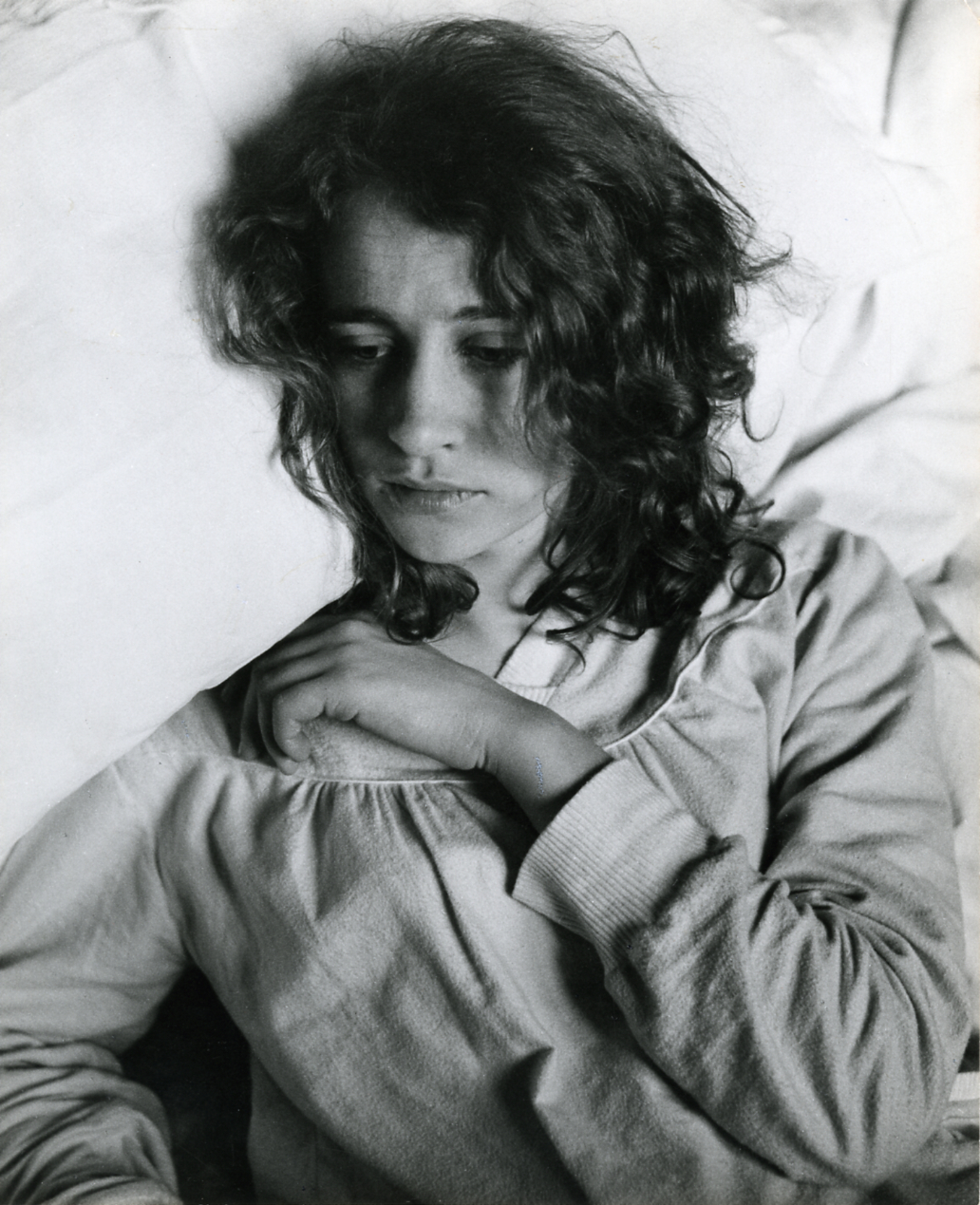
A convalescent woman. Photo by Paolo Monti.

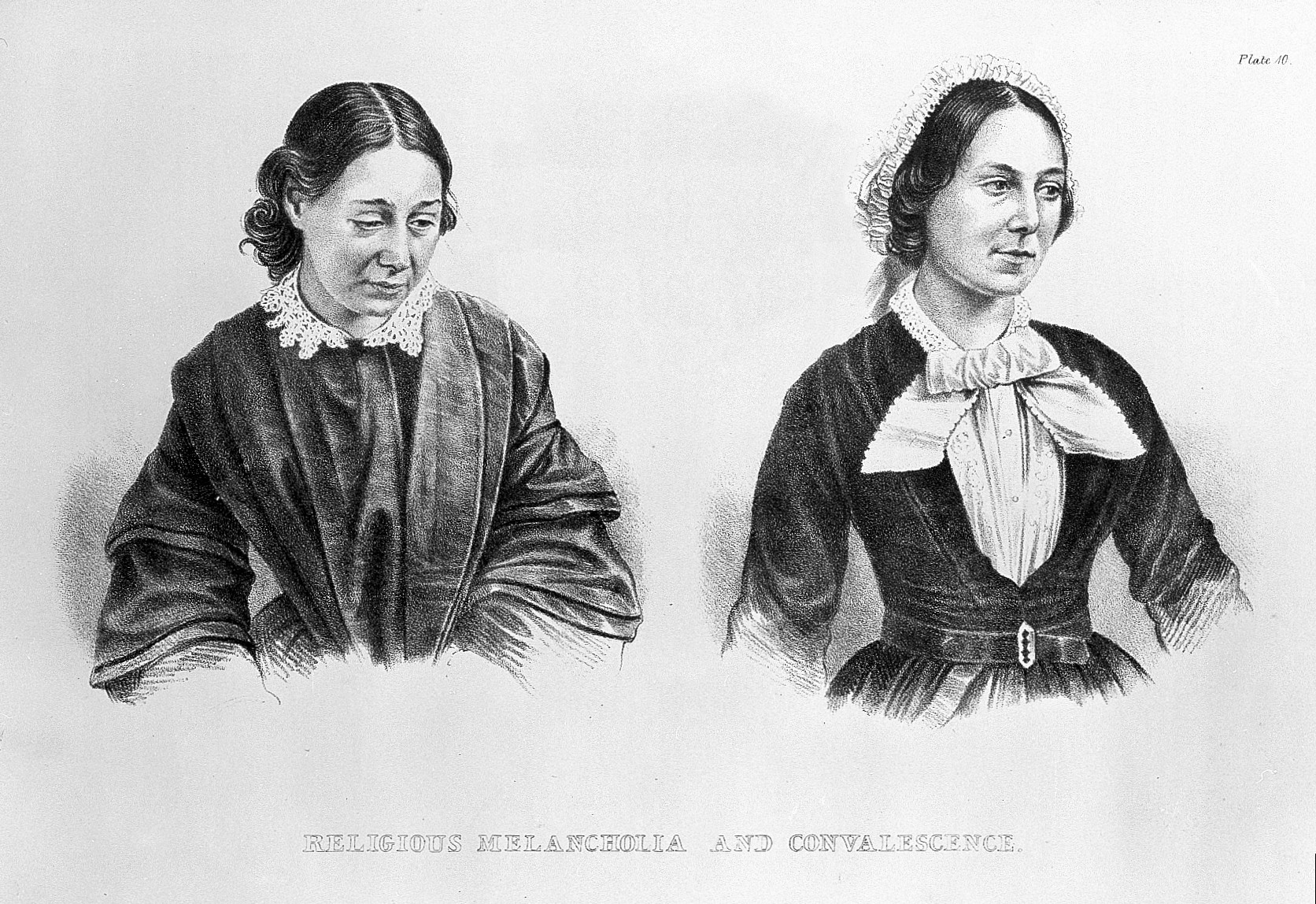
Religious melancholia and convalescence

Convalescence is the gradual recovery of health and strength after illness or injury.

It refers to the later stage of an infectious disease or illness when the patient recovers and returns to previous health, but may continue to be a source of infection to others even if feeling better. In this sense, "recovery" can be considered a synonymous term. This also sometimes includes patient care after a major surgery, under which they are required to visit the doctor for regular check-ups.

Convalescent care facilities are sometimes recognized by the acronym TCF (Transitional Convalescent Facilities).

Traditionally, time has been allowed for convalescence to happen. Nowadays, in some instances, where there is a shortage of hospital beds or of trained staff, medical settings can feel rushed and may have drifted away from a focus on convalescence.

== See also ==
- Rehabilitation, therapy to control a medical condition such as an addiction
- Recuperation (recovery), a period of physical or mental recovery
- Recuperation (sociology), a sociological concept
- Relapse, reappearance of symptoms
- Remission, absence of symptoms in chronic diseases
