= Crabbers (painting) =

Painting by James Clarke Hook

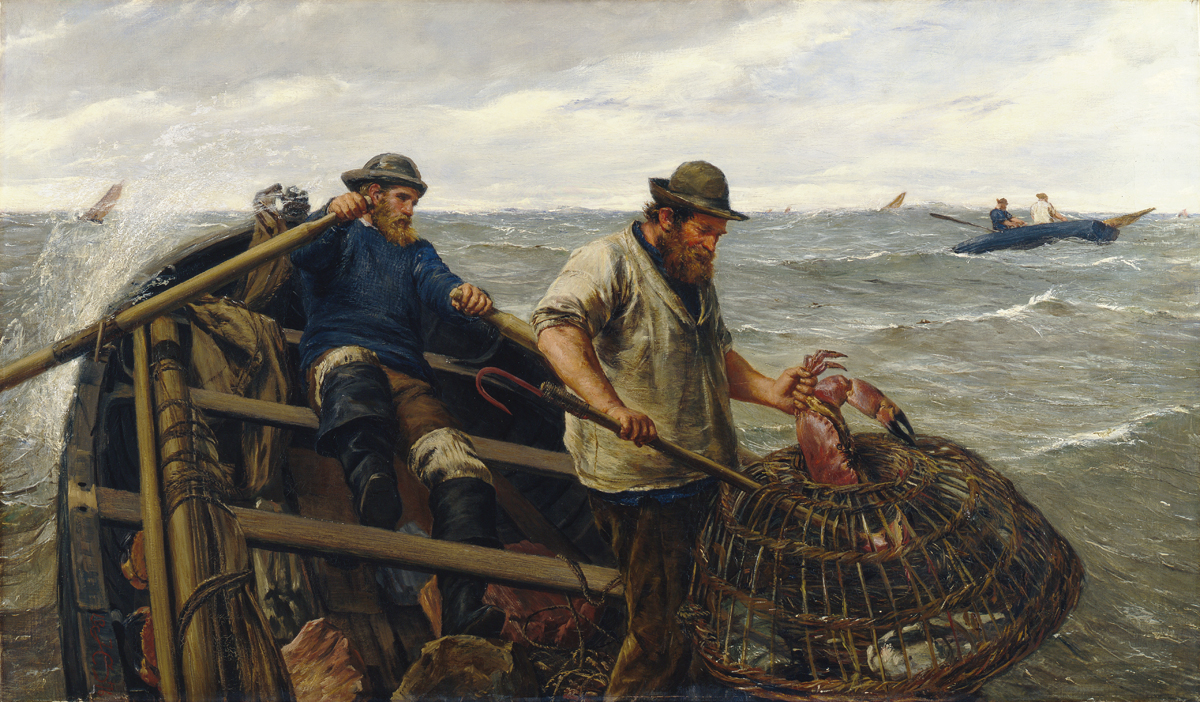
- Artist: James Clarke Hook
- Year: 1876
- Type: Oil on canvas, genre painting
- Dimensions: 77.2 cm × 132.4 cm (30.4 in × 52.1 in)
- Location: Manchester Art Gallery, Greater Manchester

Crabbers is an oil on canvas genre painting by the British artist James Clarke Hook, from 1876.

It depicts two fisherman in choppy seas off the coast of England, engaged in the crabbing trade. While one rows, the other opens a crab basket. Hook was well known for his scenes of ordinary life on the coastlines. This work shows a father and son off Hope Cove in Devon. The picture was displayed at the Royal Academy Exhibition of 1876 held at Burlington House in London. Today the painting is in the collection of the Manchester Art Gallery, having been acquired in 1904.

== Bibliography ==
- McMaster, Juliet. James Clarke Hook: Painter of the Sea. McGill-Queen's University Press, 2023.
- Payne, Christiana. Where the Sea Meets the Land: Artists on the Coast in Nineteenth-century Britain. Sanson, 2007.
