= The Council of the Royal Academy Selecting Pictures for the Exhibition, 1875 =

Charles West Cope

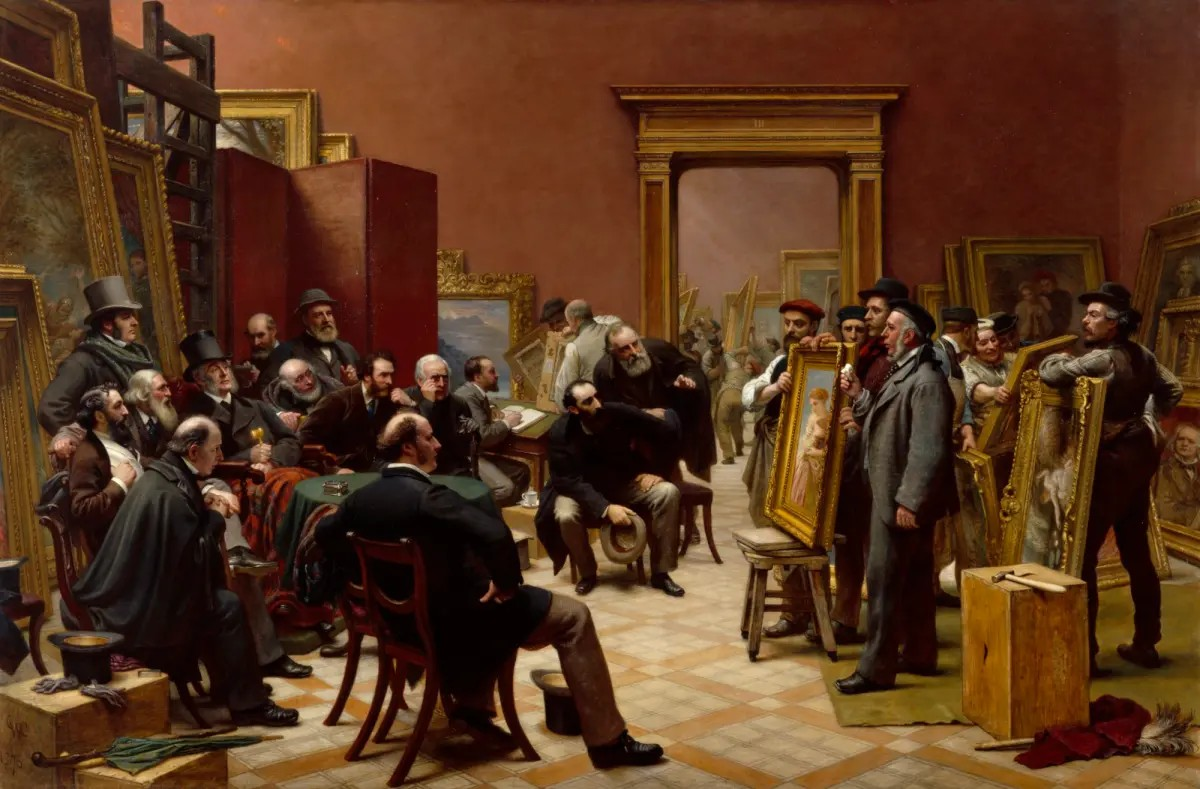
- Artist: Charles West Cope
- Year: 1876
- Type: Oil on canvas, history painting
- Dimensions: 145.2 cm × 220.1 cm (57.2 in × 86.7 in)
- Location: Royal Academy of Arts, London

The Council of the Royal Academy Selecting Pictures for the Exhibition, 1875 is an 1876 history painting by the British artist Charles West Cope. It portrays the hanging committee of the Royal Academy in London in the process of selecting paintings to appear at the Royal Academy Exhibition of 1875 at Burlington Gardens. Amongst those featured in the work are the artists John Everett Millais, who is seated in the foreground, George Richmond, Frederic Leighton, John Frederick Lewis, Edward Matthew Ward, Francis Grant, Thomas Faed, Richard Redgrave, Edward Armitage, John Callcott Horsley and James Clarke Hook. The academy's secretary Frederick A. Eaton sits writing while Cope added a self-portrait of himself at the back of the group. Cope's painting was itself displayed at the Summer Exhibition of 1876. The painting is now in the collection of the Royal Academy.

== Bibliography ==
- Armitage, Jill R. Edward Armitage RA: Battles in the Victorian Art World. Troubador Publishing, 2017.
- Bury, Stephen (ed.) Benezit Dictionary of British Graphic Artists and Illustrators, Volume 1. OUP, 2012.
- Gould, Charlotte (ed.) Marketing Art in the British Isles, 1700 to the Present: A Cultural History. Routledge, 2017.
