= Royal Academy Exhibition of 1876 =

1876 art exhibition in London

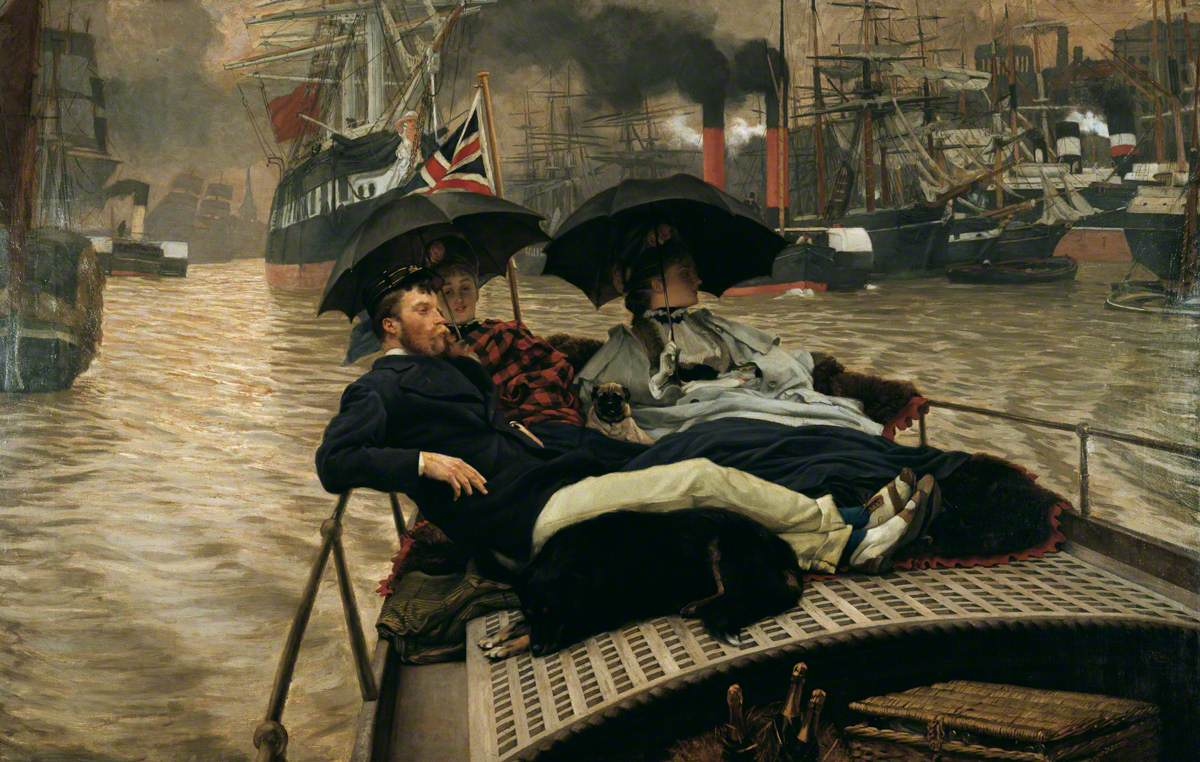
On the Thames by James Tissot

The Royal Academy Exhibition of 1876 was the hundred and eighth annual Summer Exhibition hosted by the British Royal Academy of Arts. It ran between 1 May and 7 August 1876 at Burlington House in London's Piccadilly. It showcased works from leading artists and architects of the Victorian era, and attracted over 320,000 visitors during its run.

Charles West Cope displayed The Council of the Royal Academy Selecting Pictures for the Exhibition, 1875 which showed leading members of the Royal Academy judging which paintings should be shown at the previous year's exhibition, which was one of the most widely discussed works. The large number of portrait paintings on display were commented on, while The Art Journal praised Over the Hills and Far Away by John Everett Millais as "the grandest piece of landscape in this year's exhibition".

The French artist James Tissot displayed On the Thames, which drew near unanimous criticism due to its portrayal of a man accompanied by potential female conquests on a boat in the Pool of London. He also exhibited The Convalescent, painted in his own London garden. Henri Félix Emmanuel Philippoteaux showed The Charge of the Heavy Brigade depicting the Battle of Balaclava during the Crimean War.

== Gallery ==
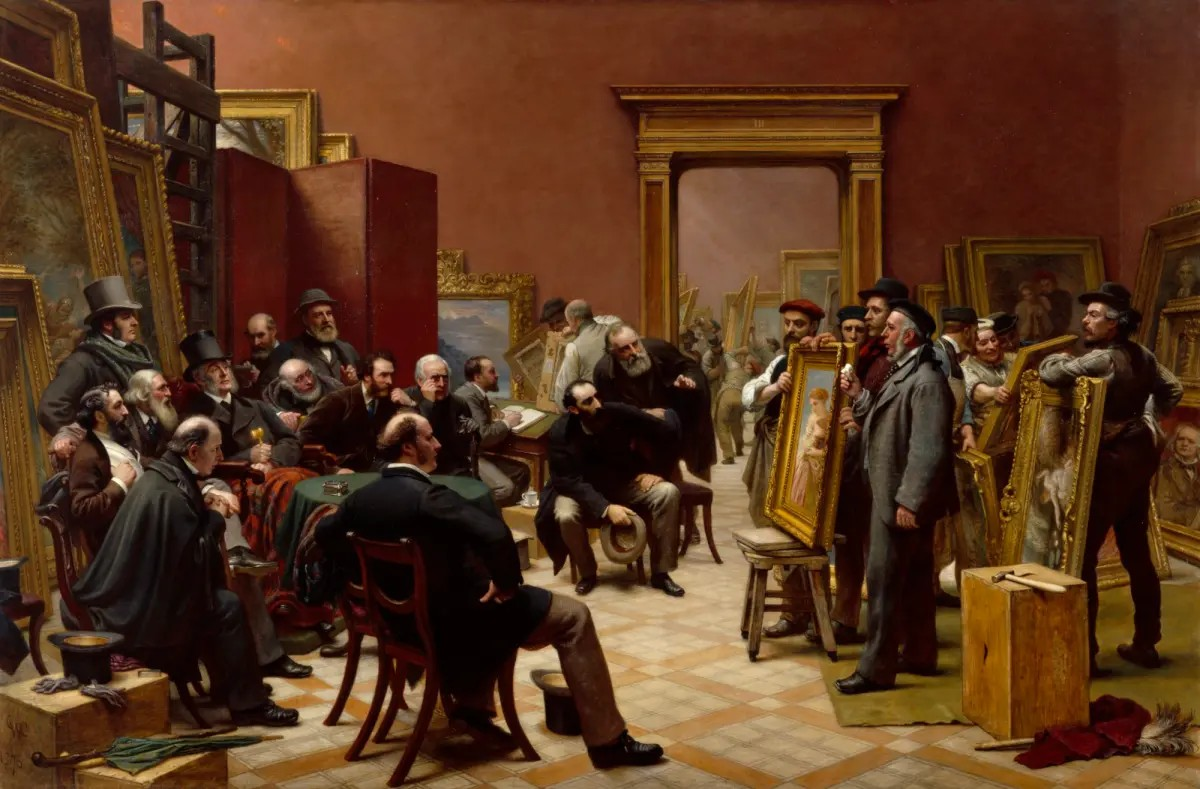
The Council of the Royal Academy Selecting Pictures for the Exhibition, 1875 by Charles West Cope

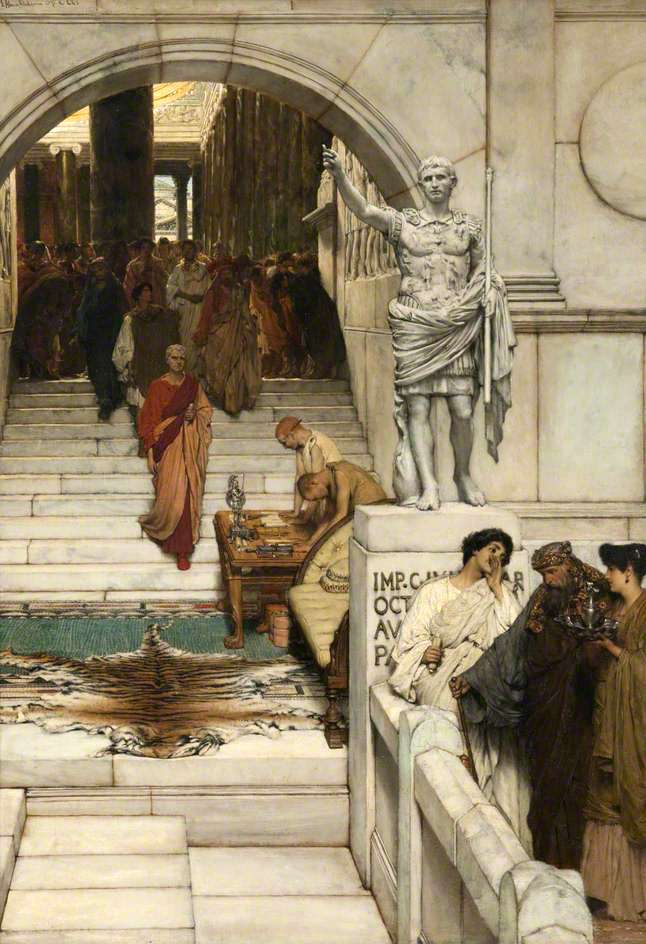
An Audience at Agrippa's by Lawrence Alma-Tadema

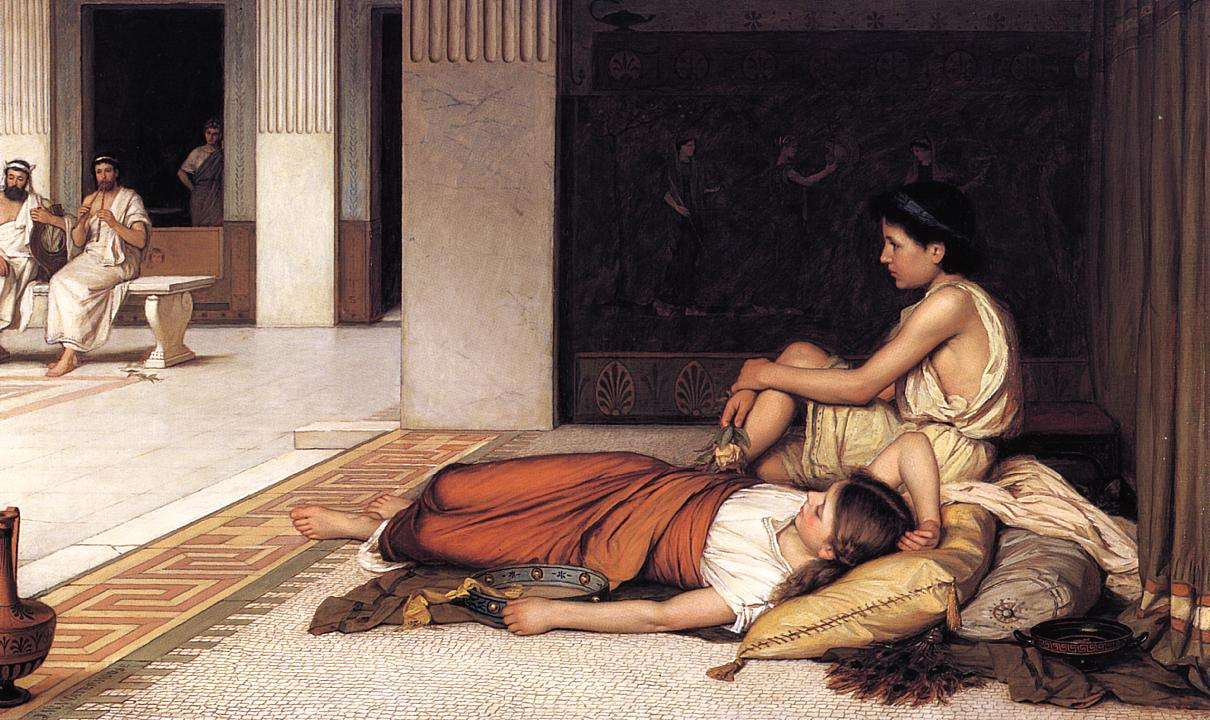
After the Dance by John William Waterhouse

The Rivals by Charles Edward Perugini

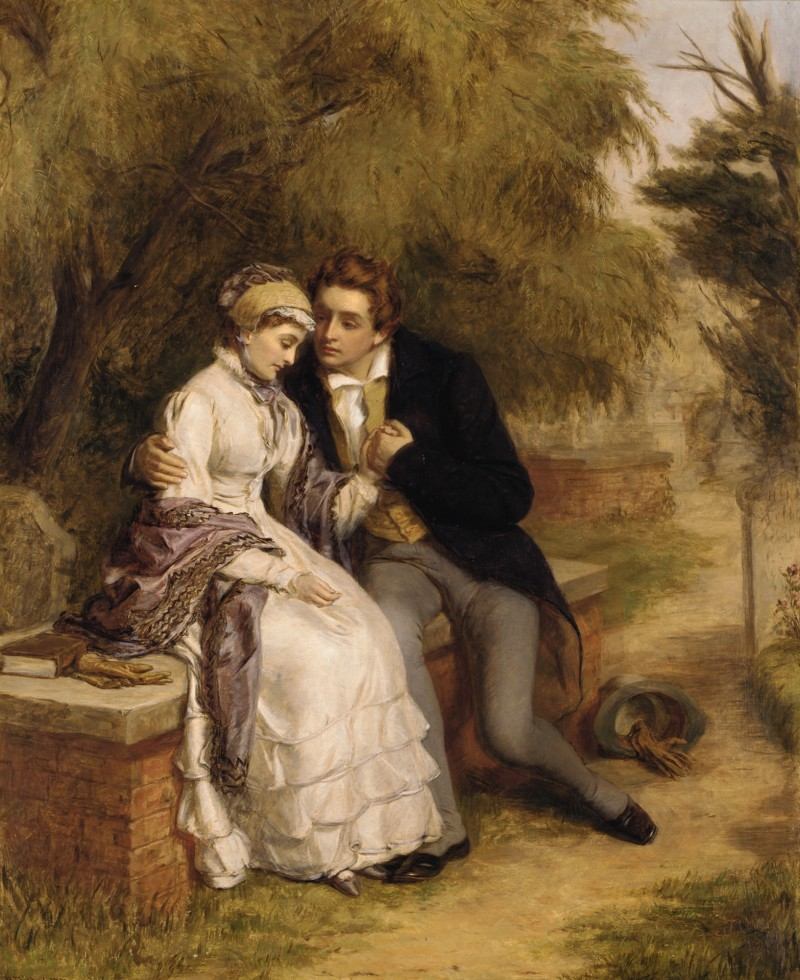
The Lover's Seat by William Powell Frith

The Vicar of Wakefield by William Powell Frith

A Zuyder Zee Fishing Haven by Edward William Cooke

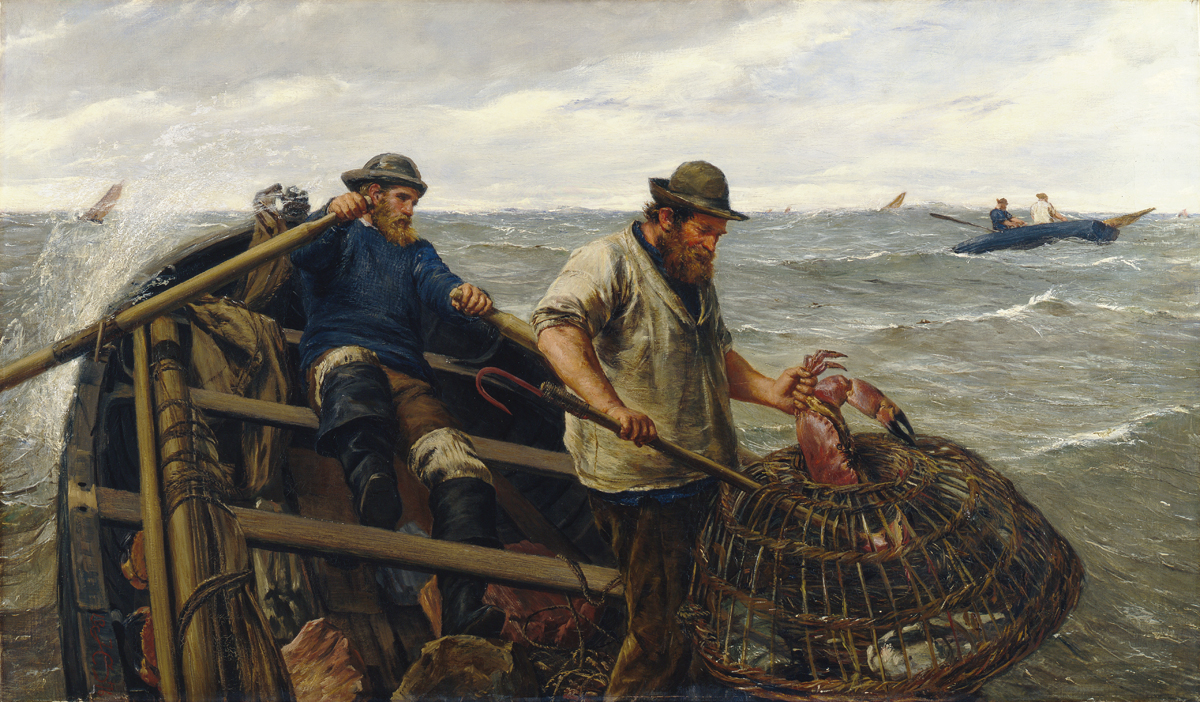
Crabbers by James Clarke Hook

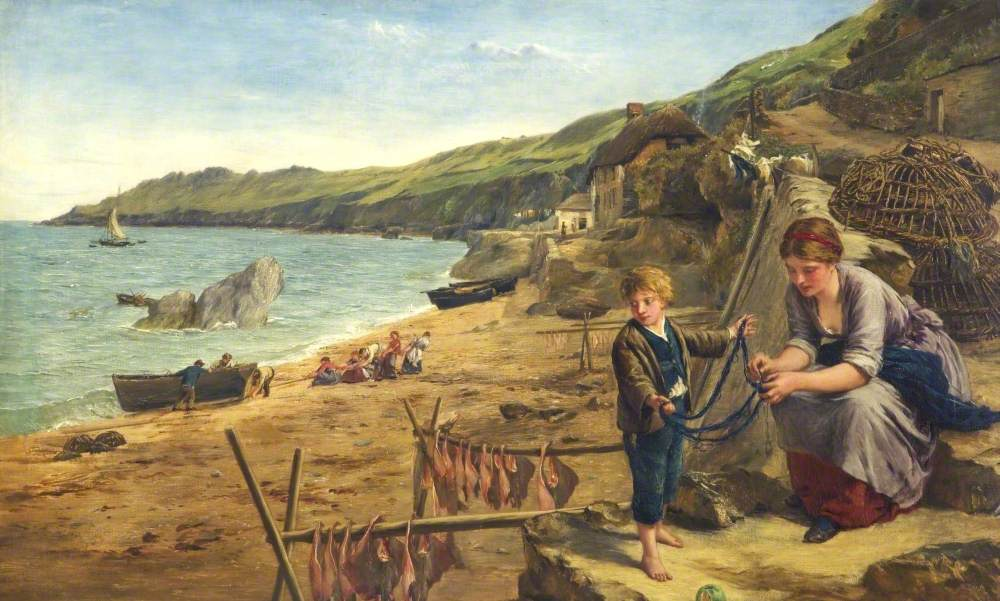
Hard Lines by James Clarke Hook

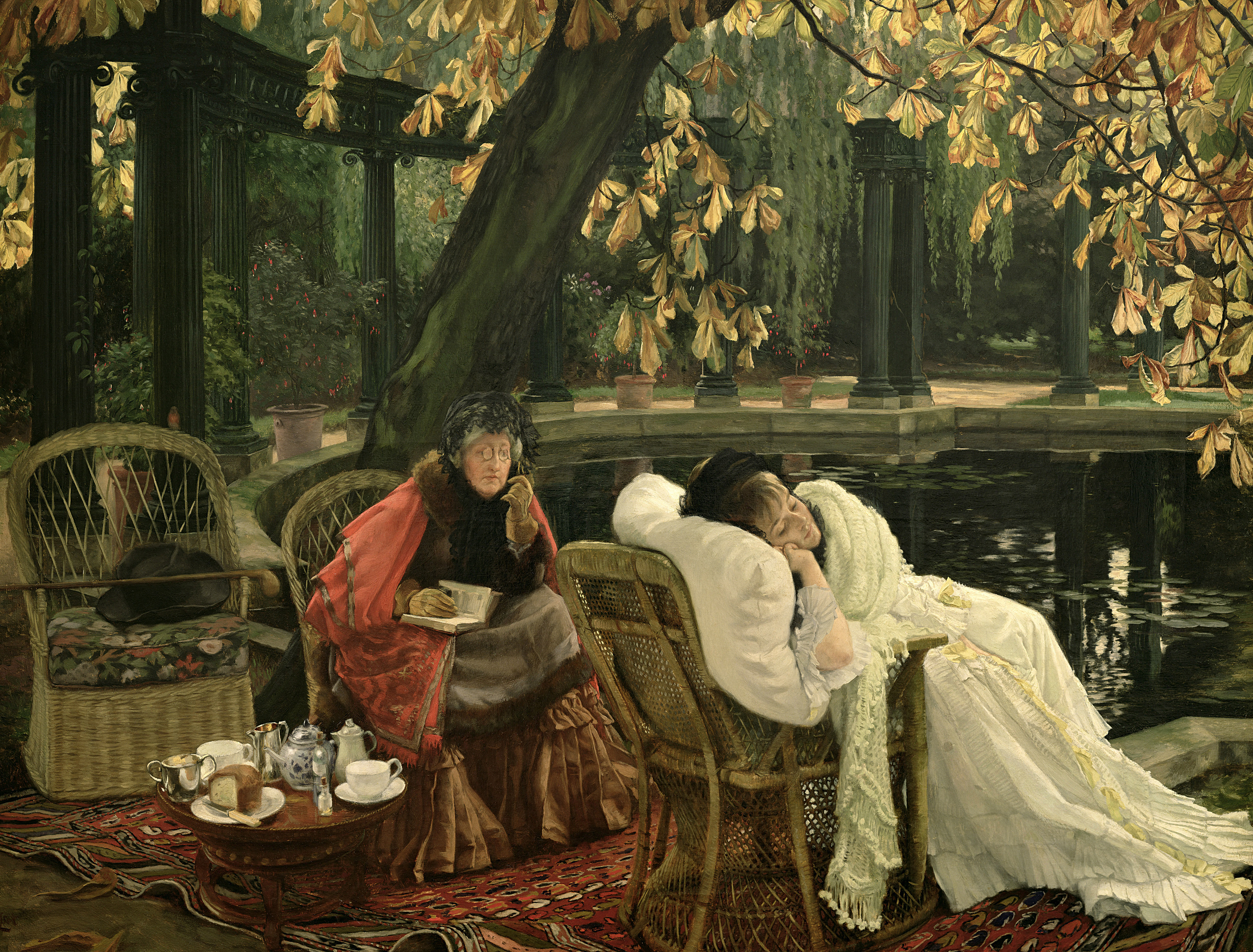
The Convalescent by James Tissot

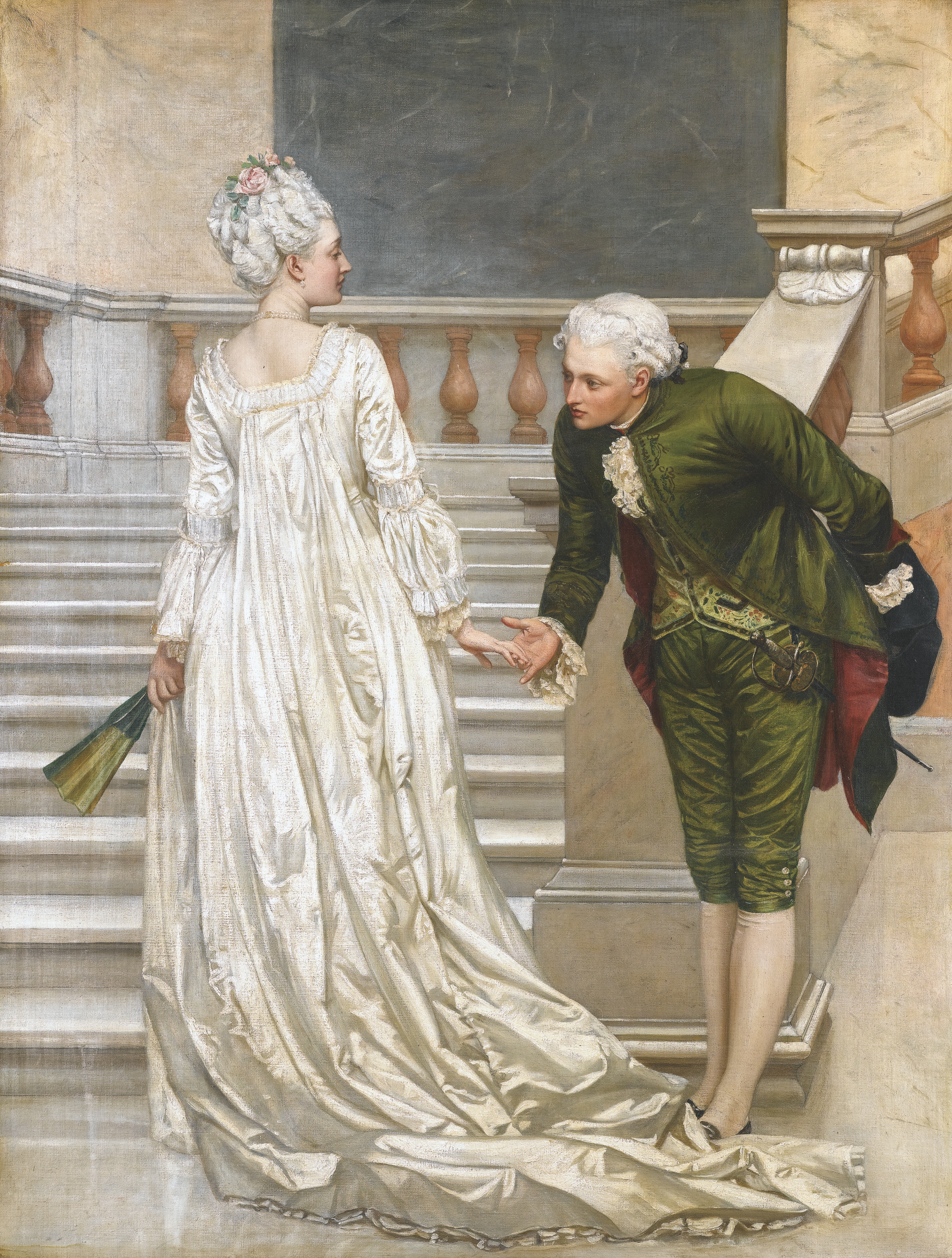
À Bientôt by Valentine Cameron Prinsep

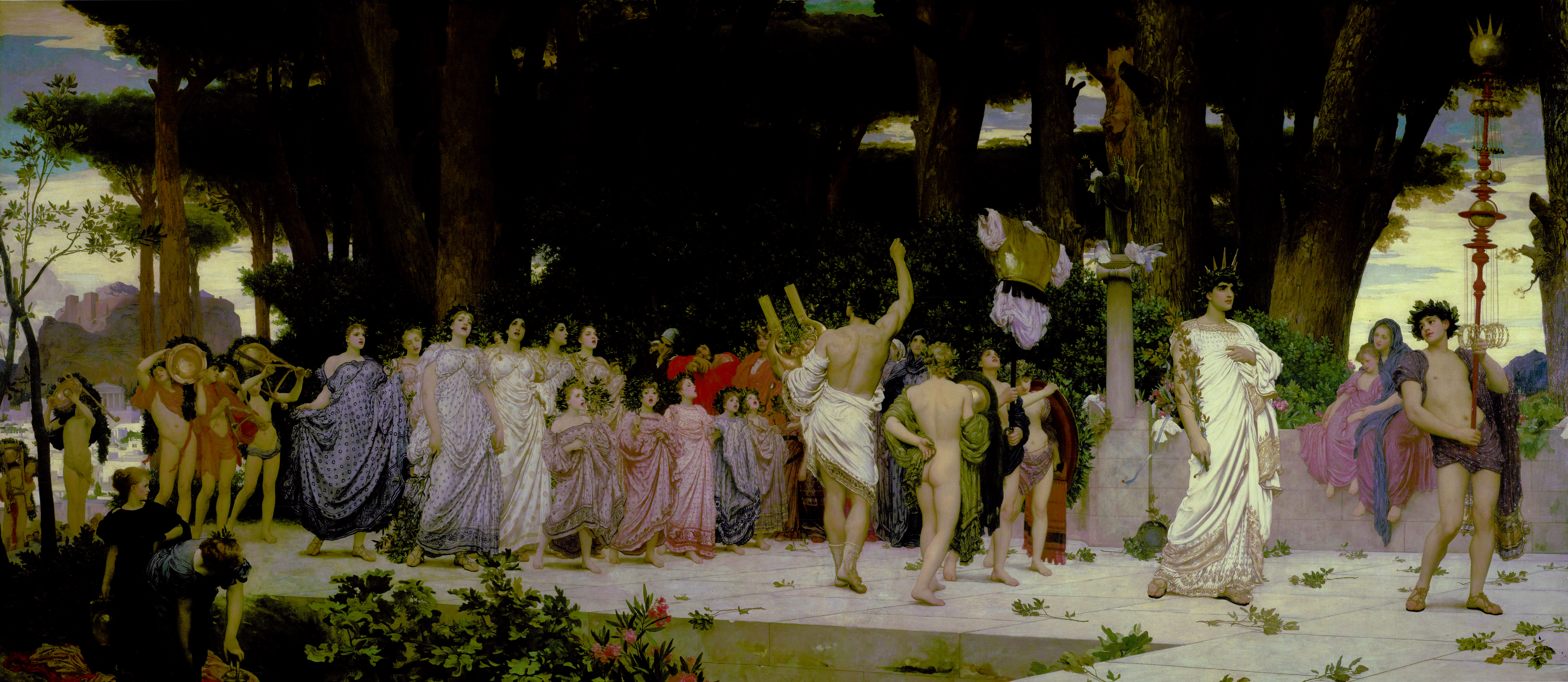
Daphnephoria by Frederic Leighton

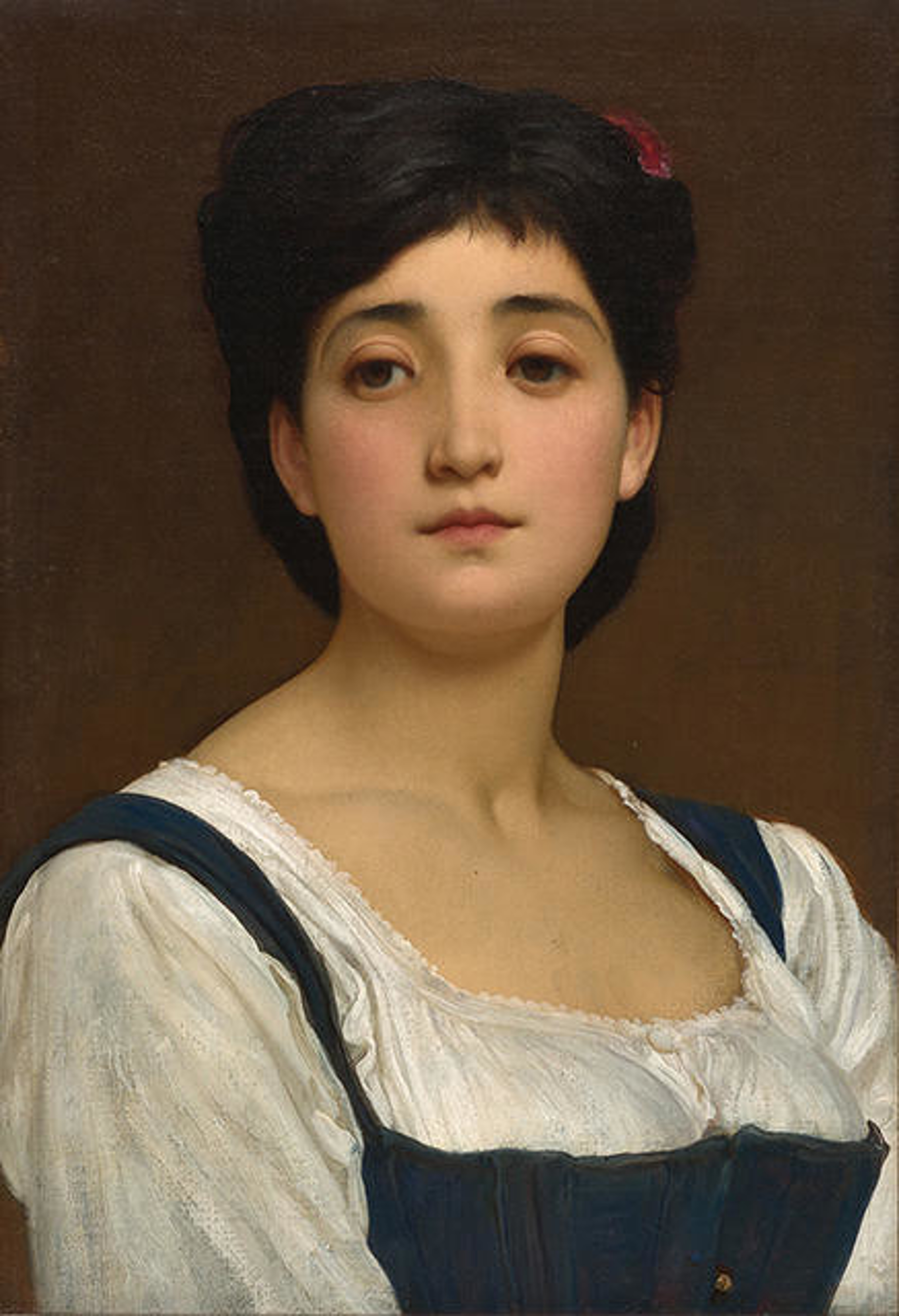
Teresina by Frederic Leighton

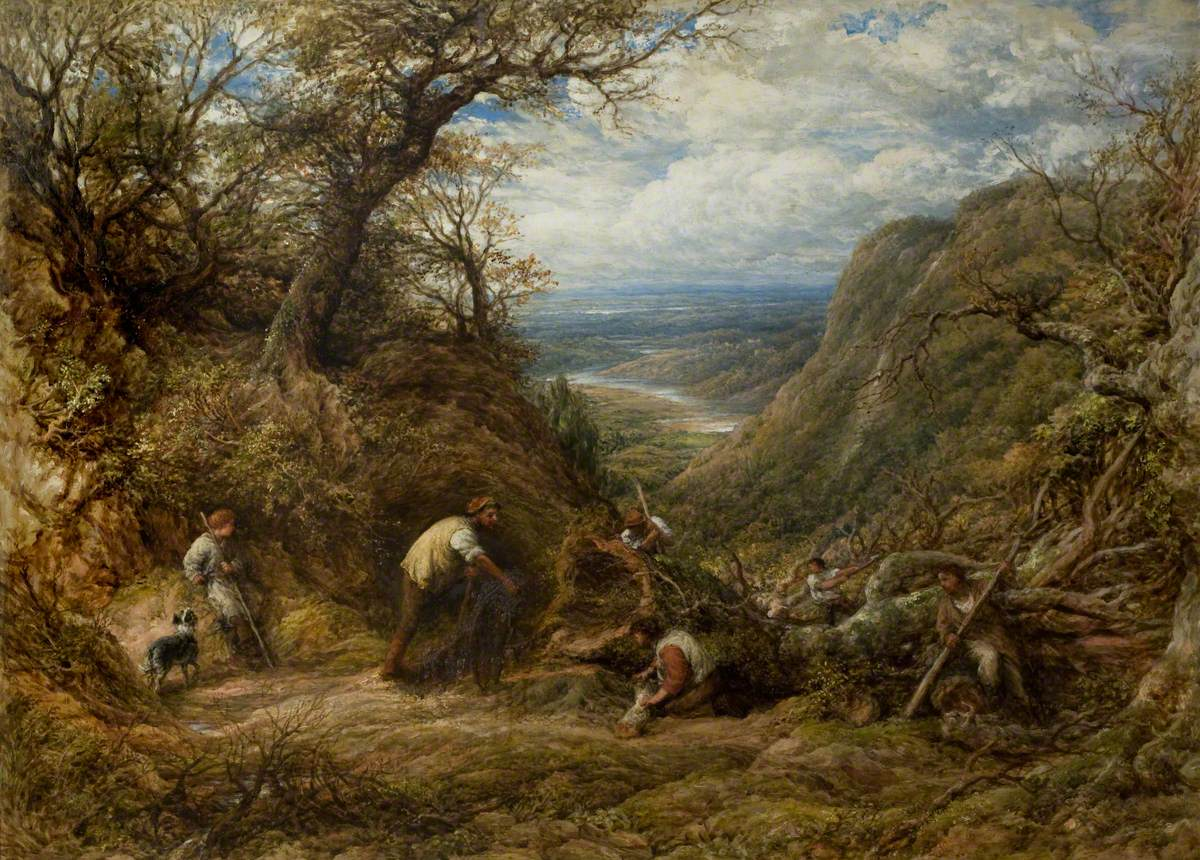
The Hollow Tree by John Linnell

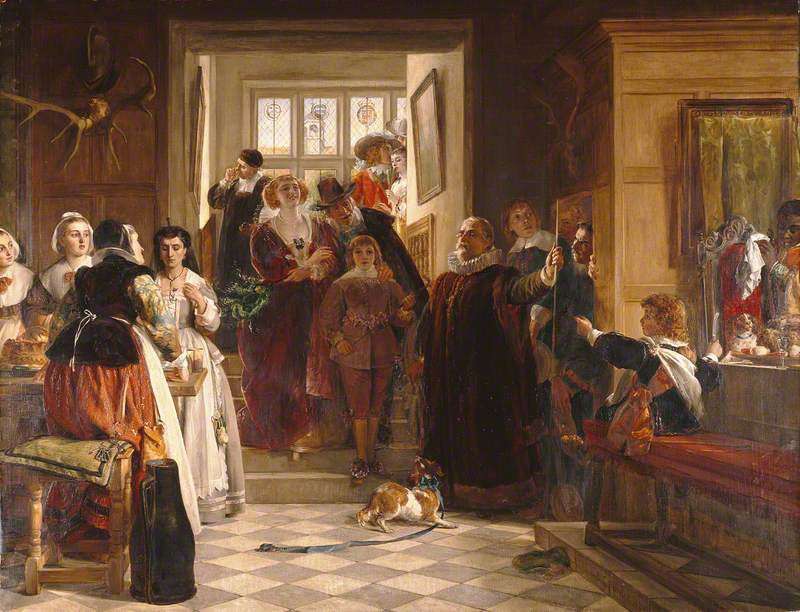
Coming Down to Dinner by John Callcott Horsley

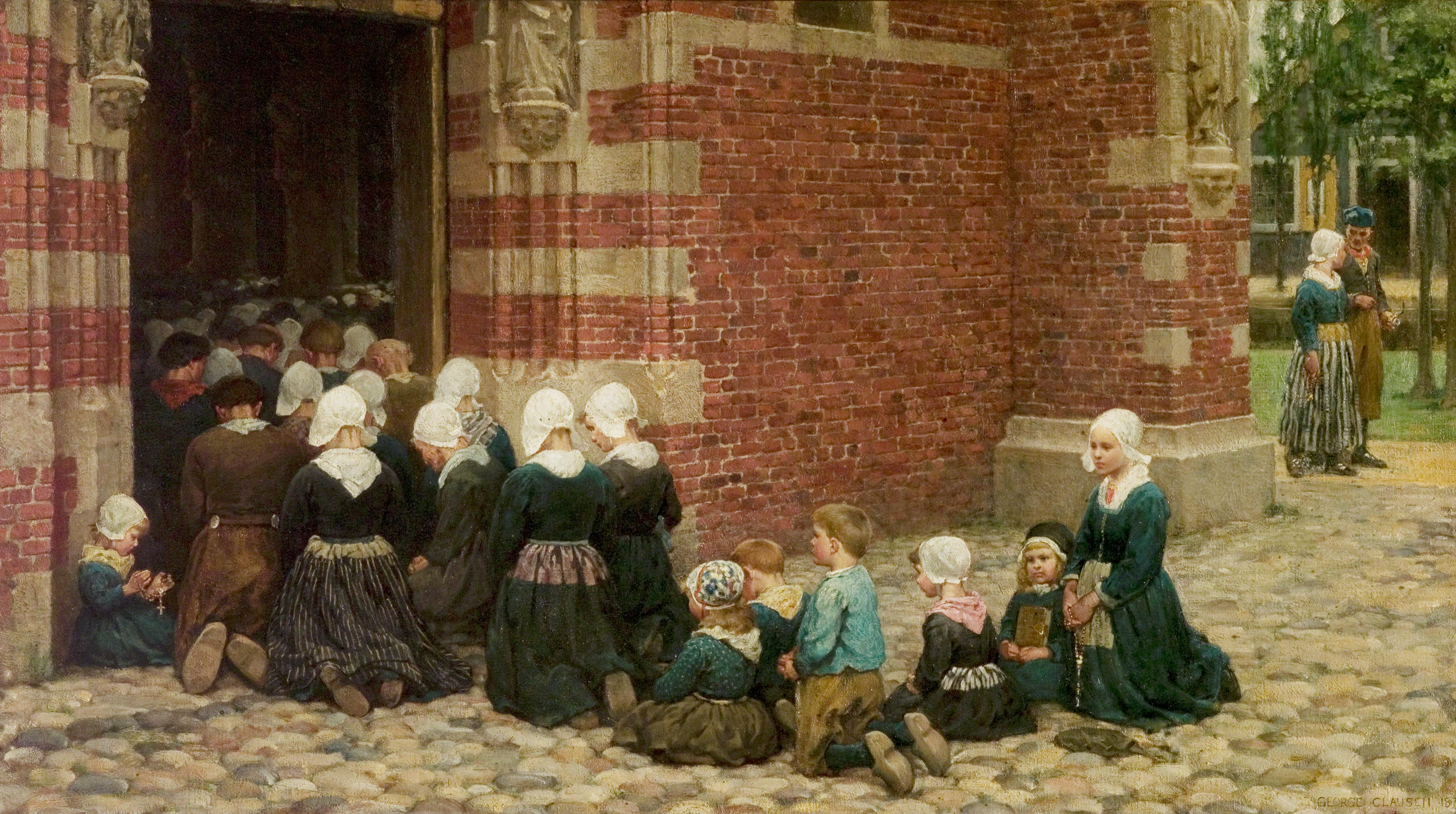
High Mass at a Fishing Village on the Zuyder Zee by George Clausen

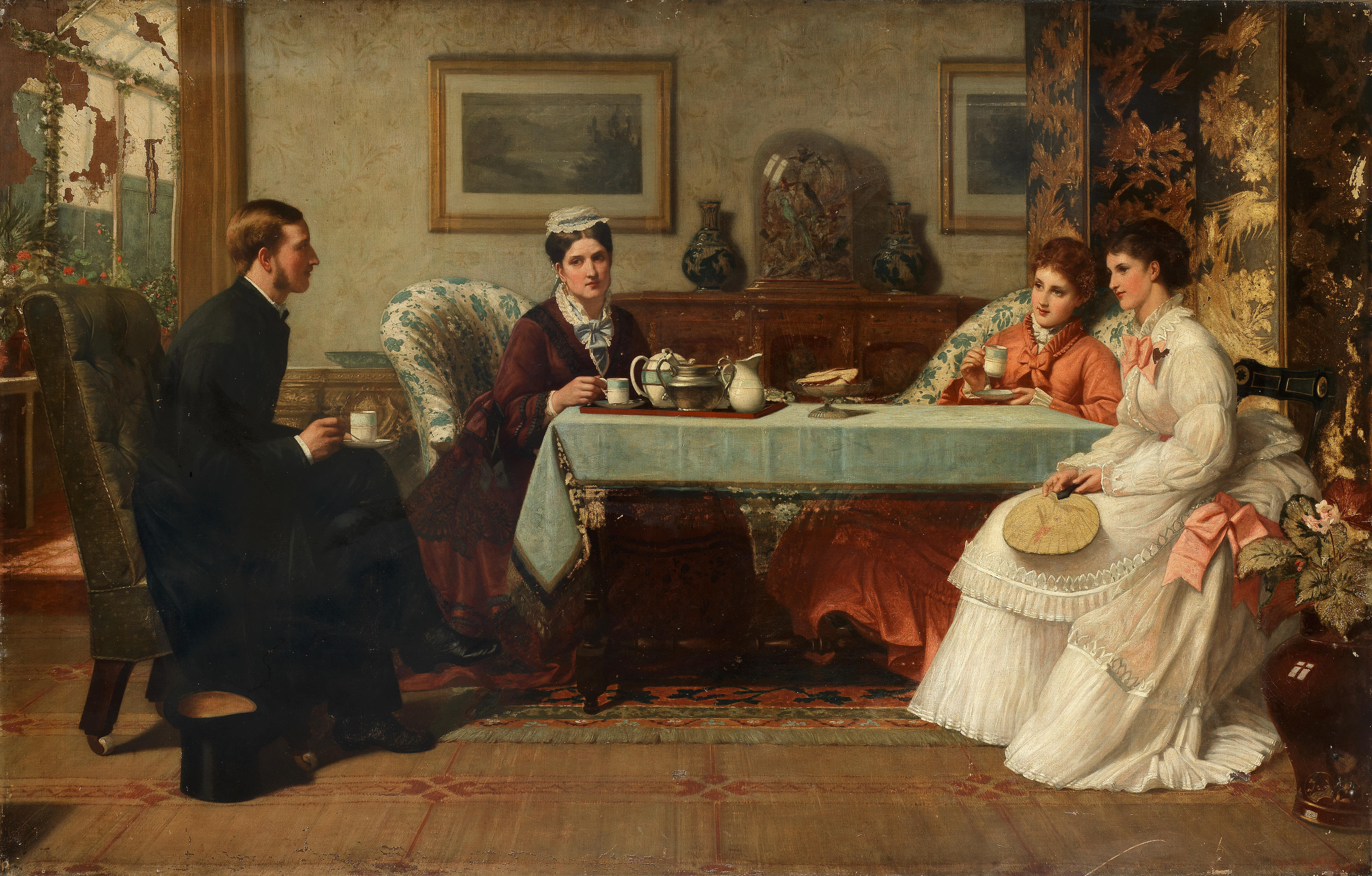
The New Curate by David Wilkie Wynfield

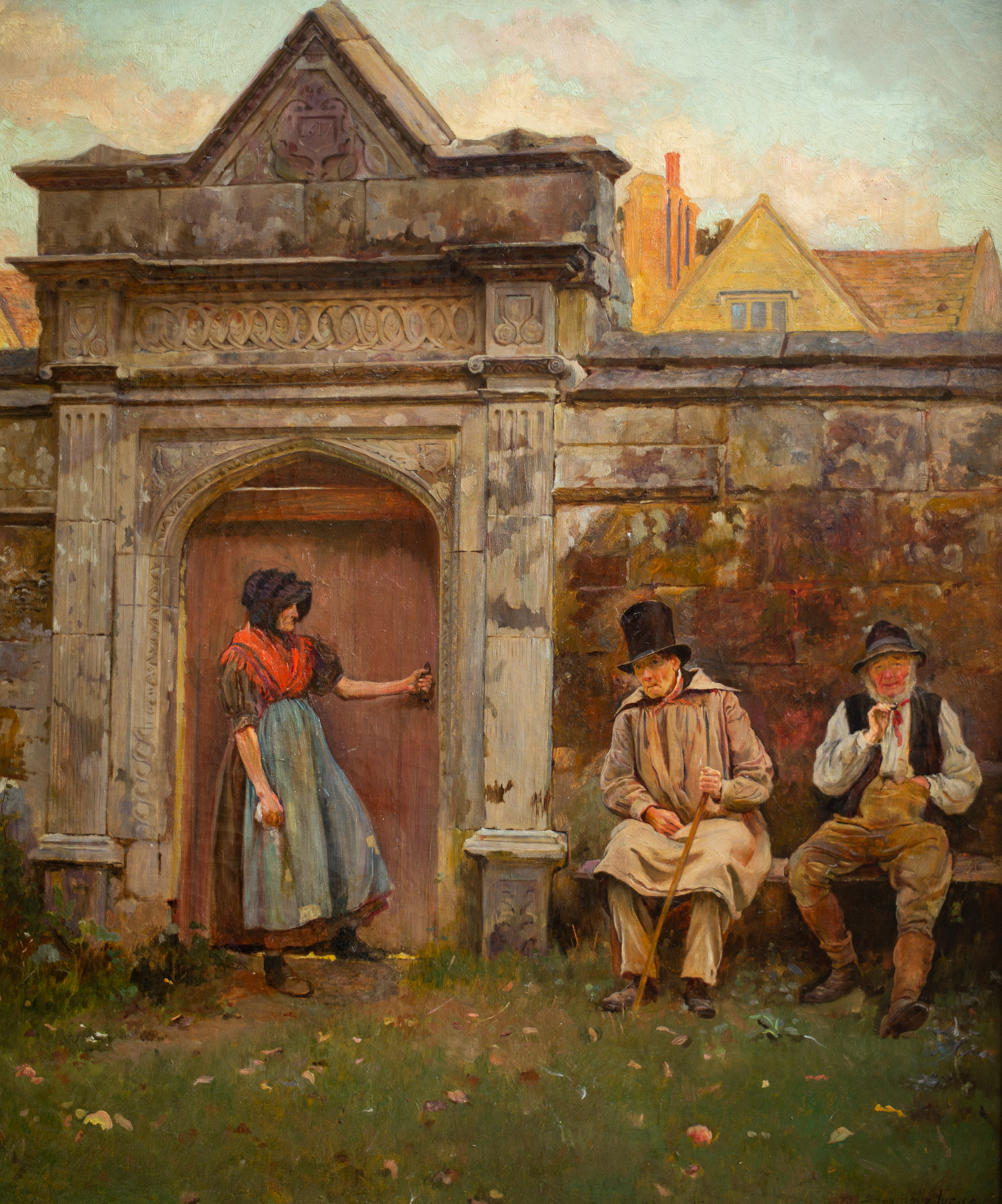
The Old Gateway by John Seymour Lucas

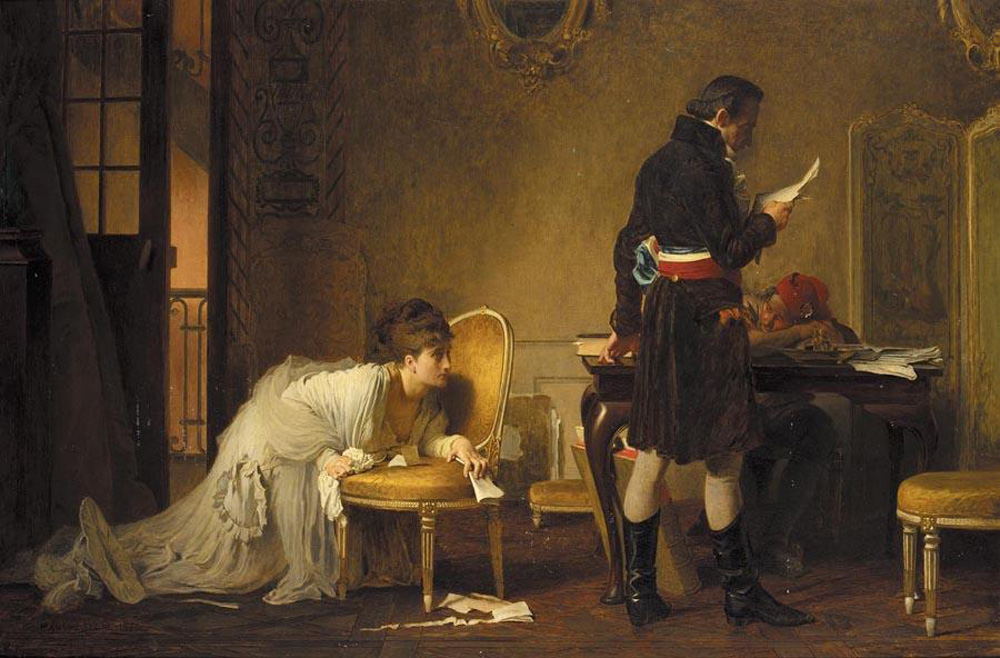
An Appeal for Mercy, 1793 by Marcus Stone

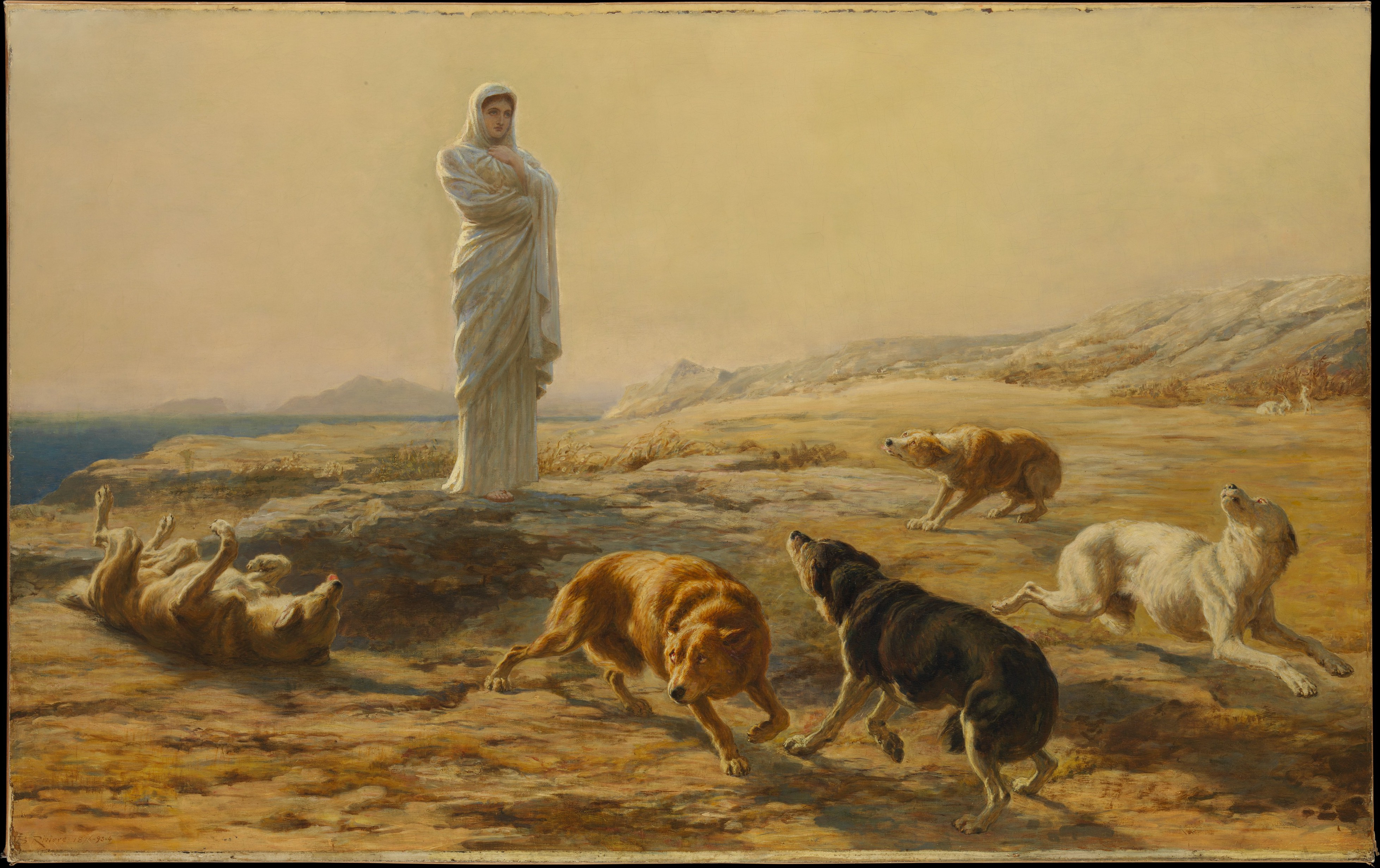
Pallas Athena and the Herdsman's Dogs by Briton Riviere

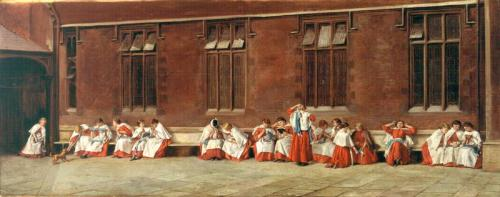
Darning Day by Eyre Crowe

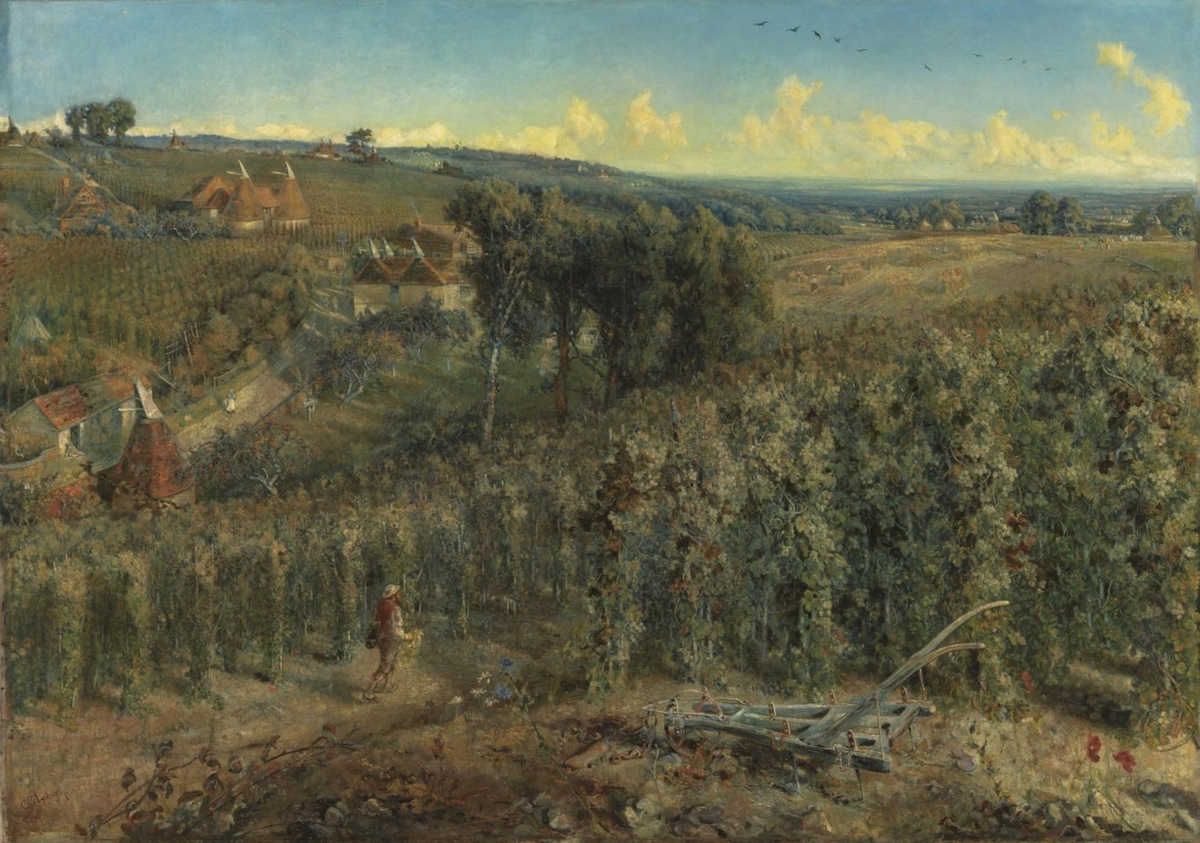
The Hop-Gardens of England by Cecil Gordon Lawson

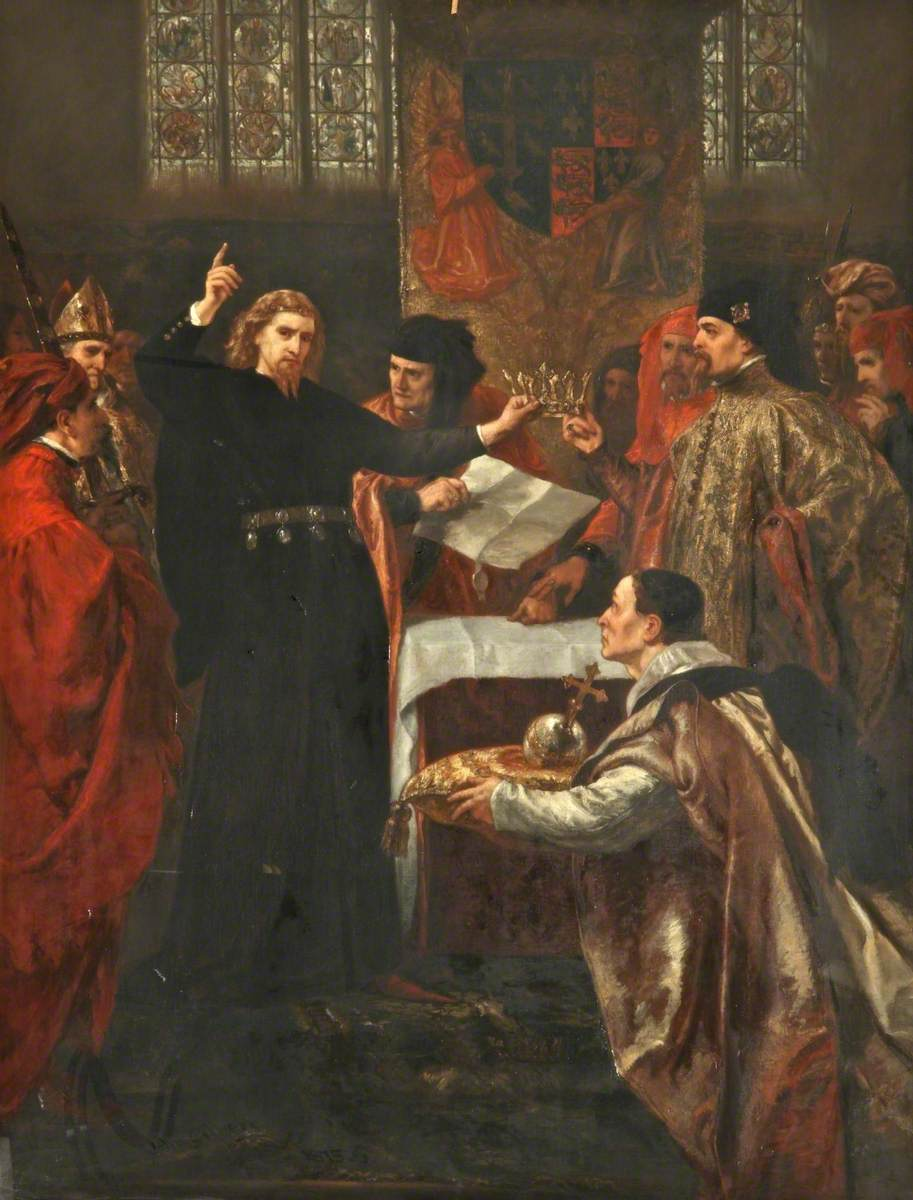
Richard II Resigning the Crown to Bolingbroke by John Gilbert

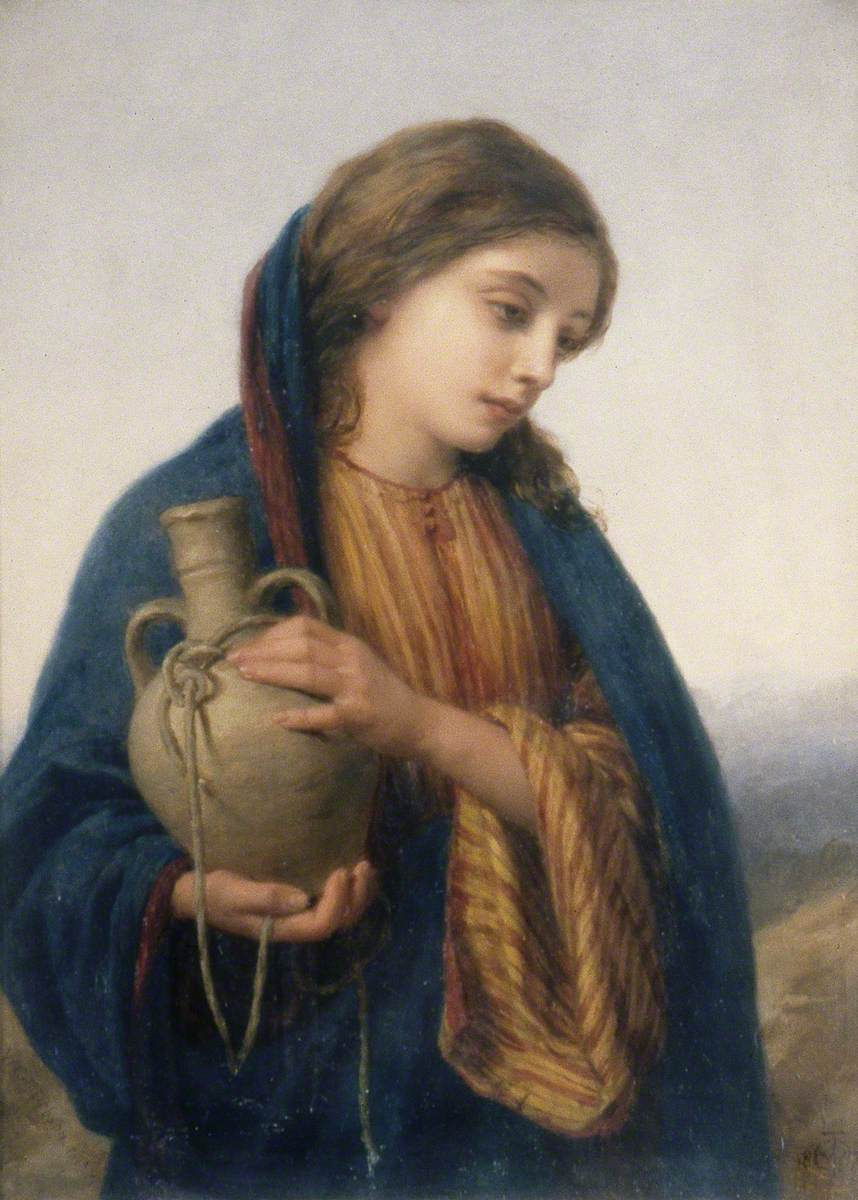
Rebecca by William Charles Thomas Dobson

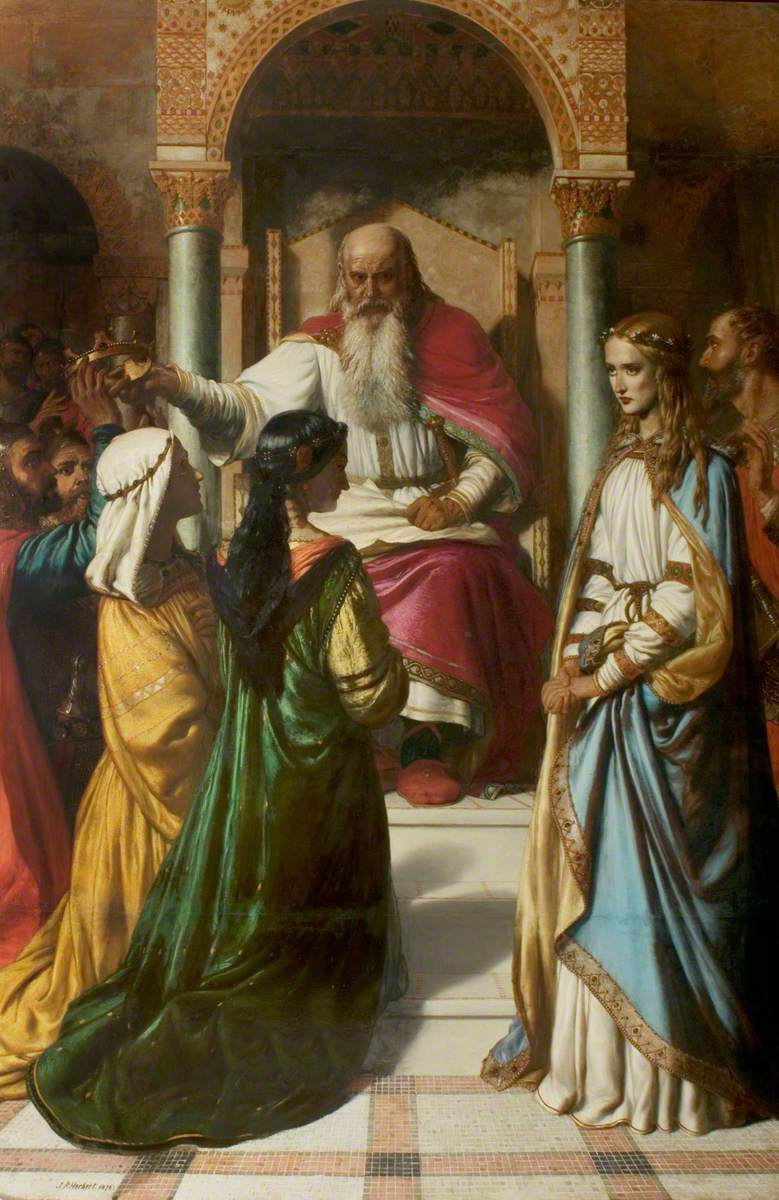
King Lear Disinheriting Cordelia by John Rogers Herbert

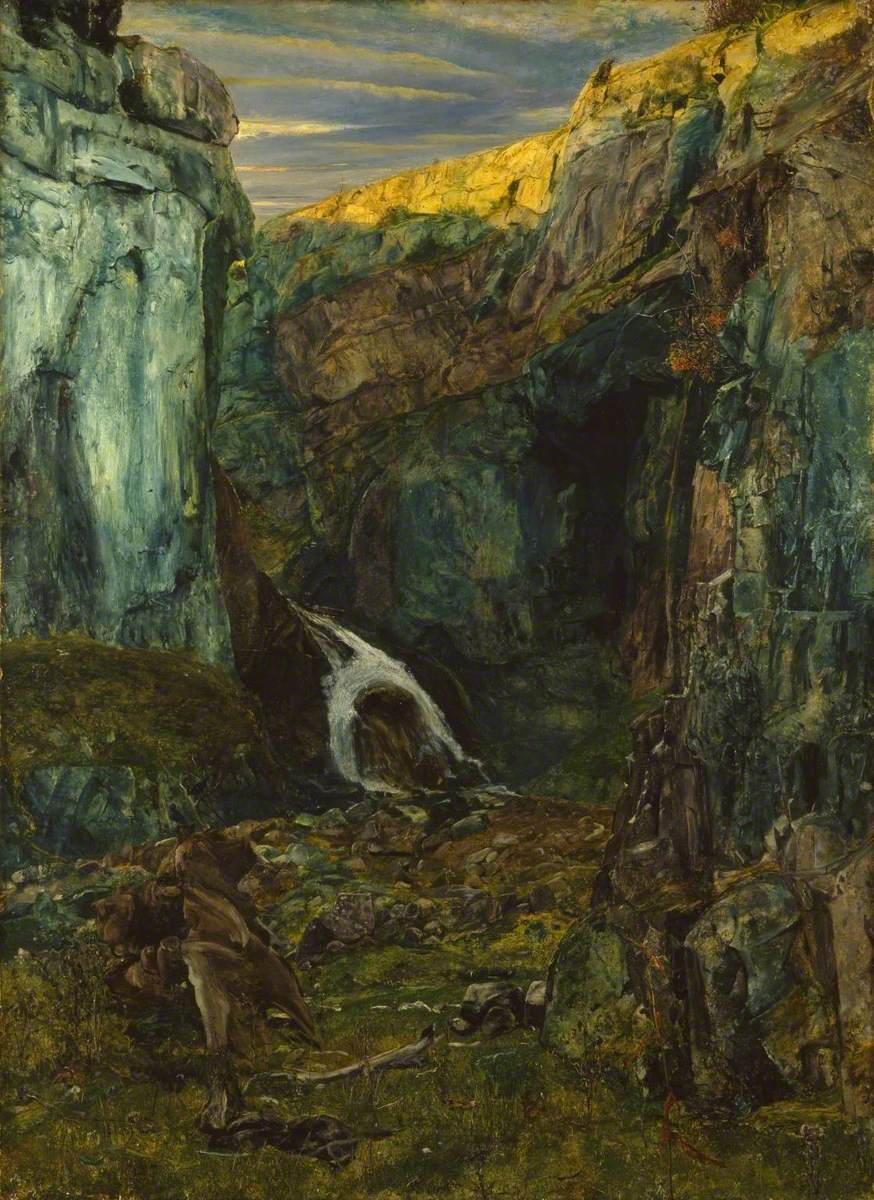
Gordale Scar by John William Inchbold

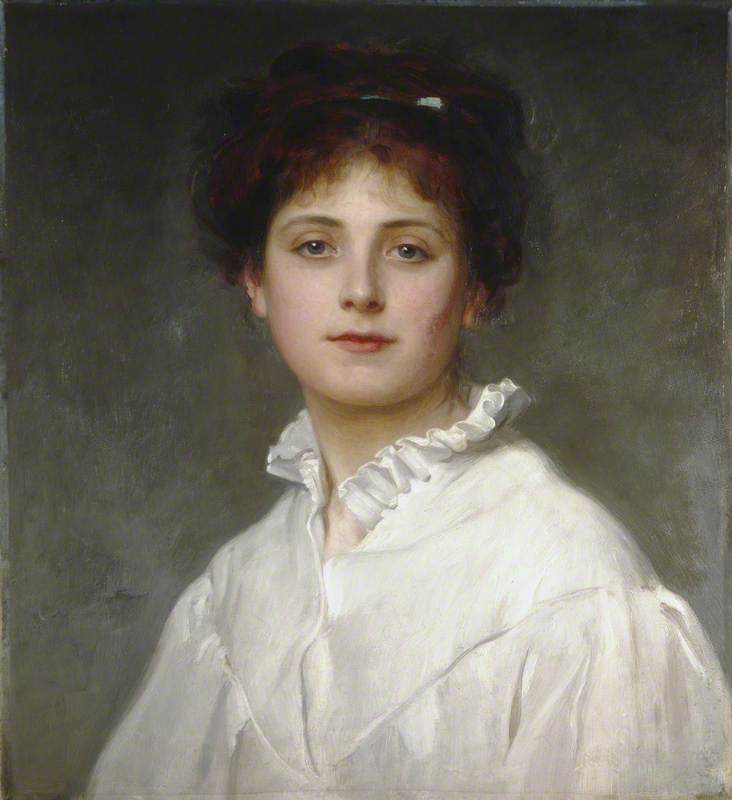
Margaret by Philip Hermogenes Calderon

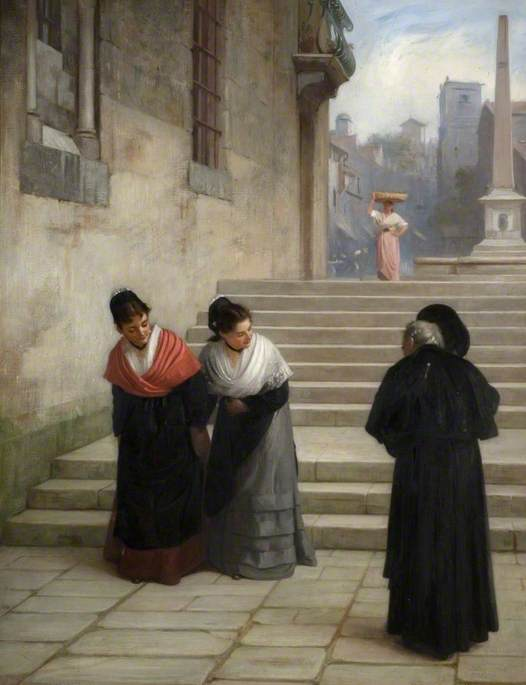
His Reverence by Philip Hermogenes Calderon

Under Lock and Key by John Callcott Horsley

A Birthday Tea Party by Thomas Webster

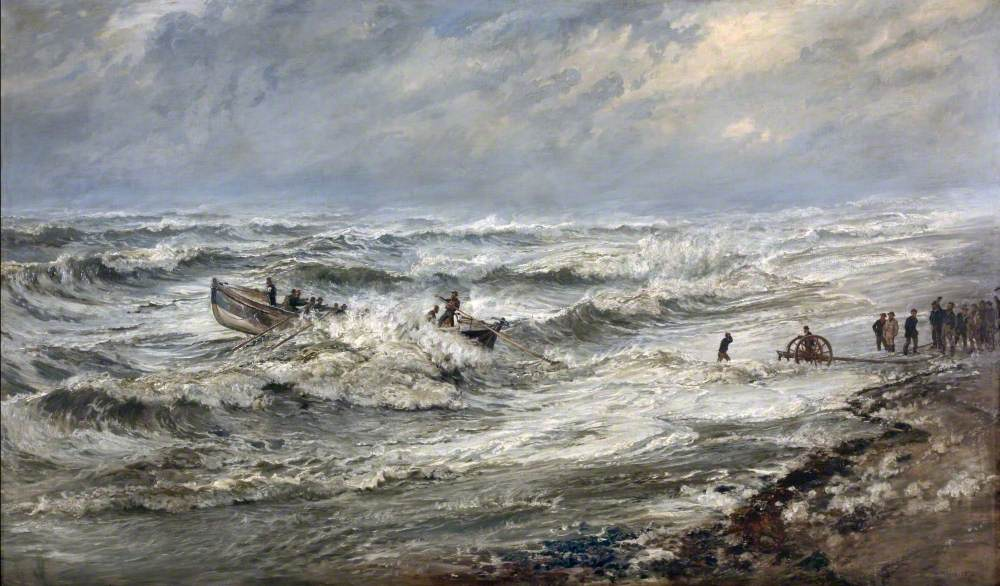
Launching the Lifeboat by Henry Moore

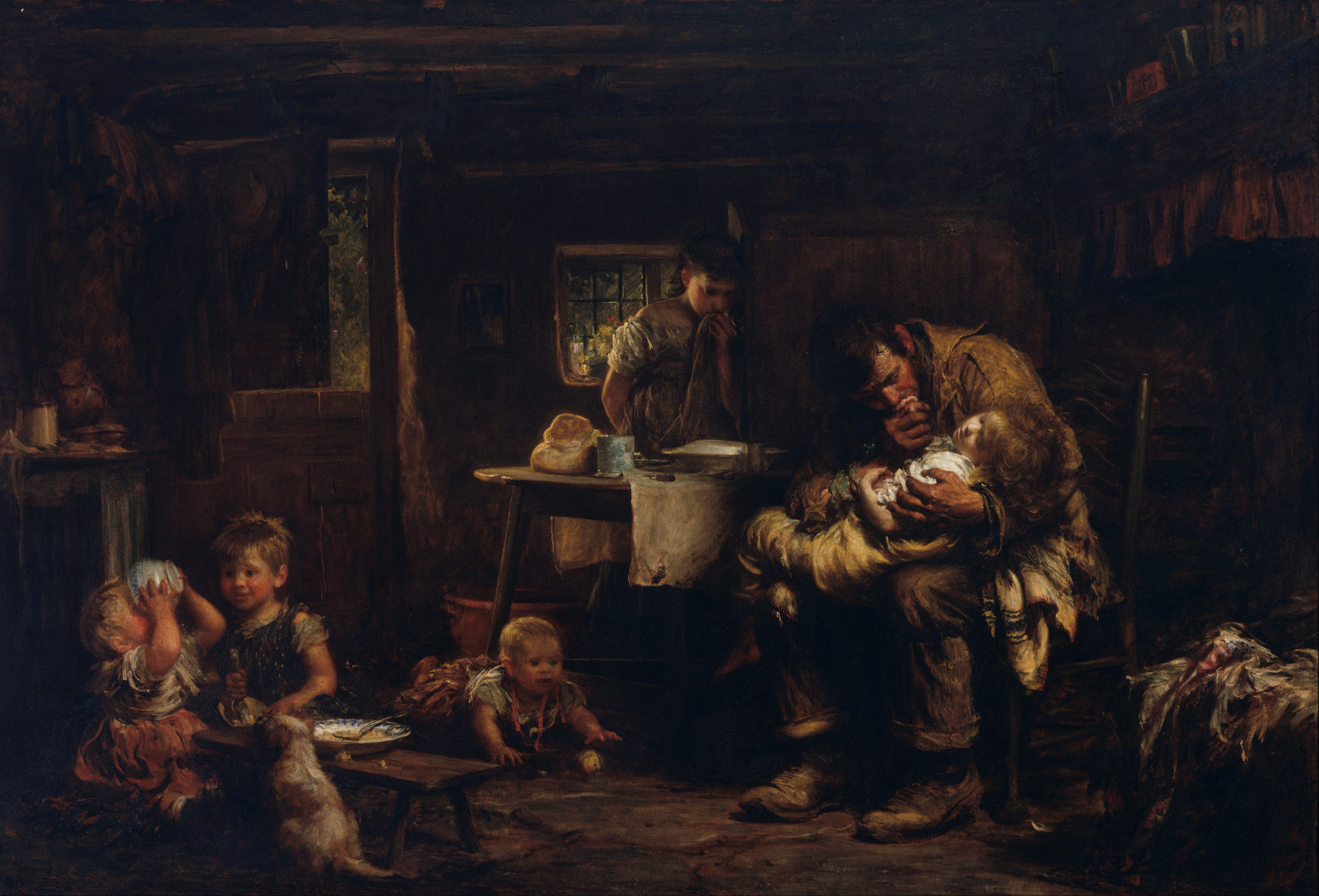
The Widower by Luke Fildes

Looking Out For a Safe Investment by Erskine Nicol

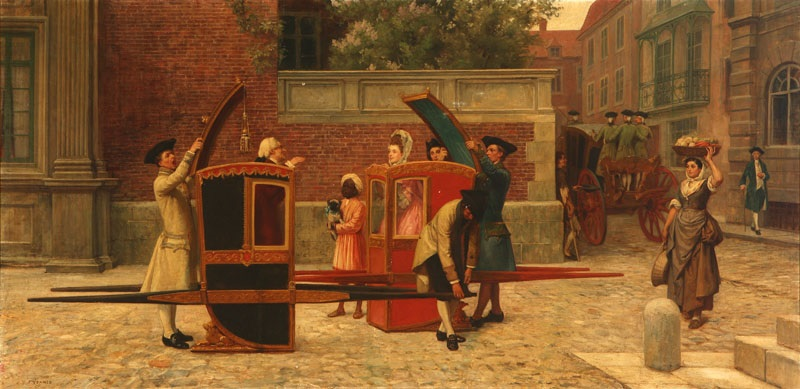
The Last Bit of Scandal by William Frederick Yeames

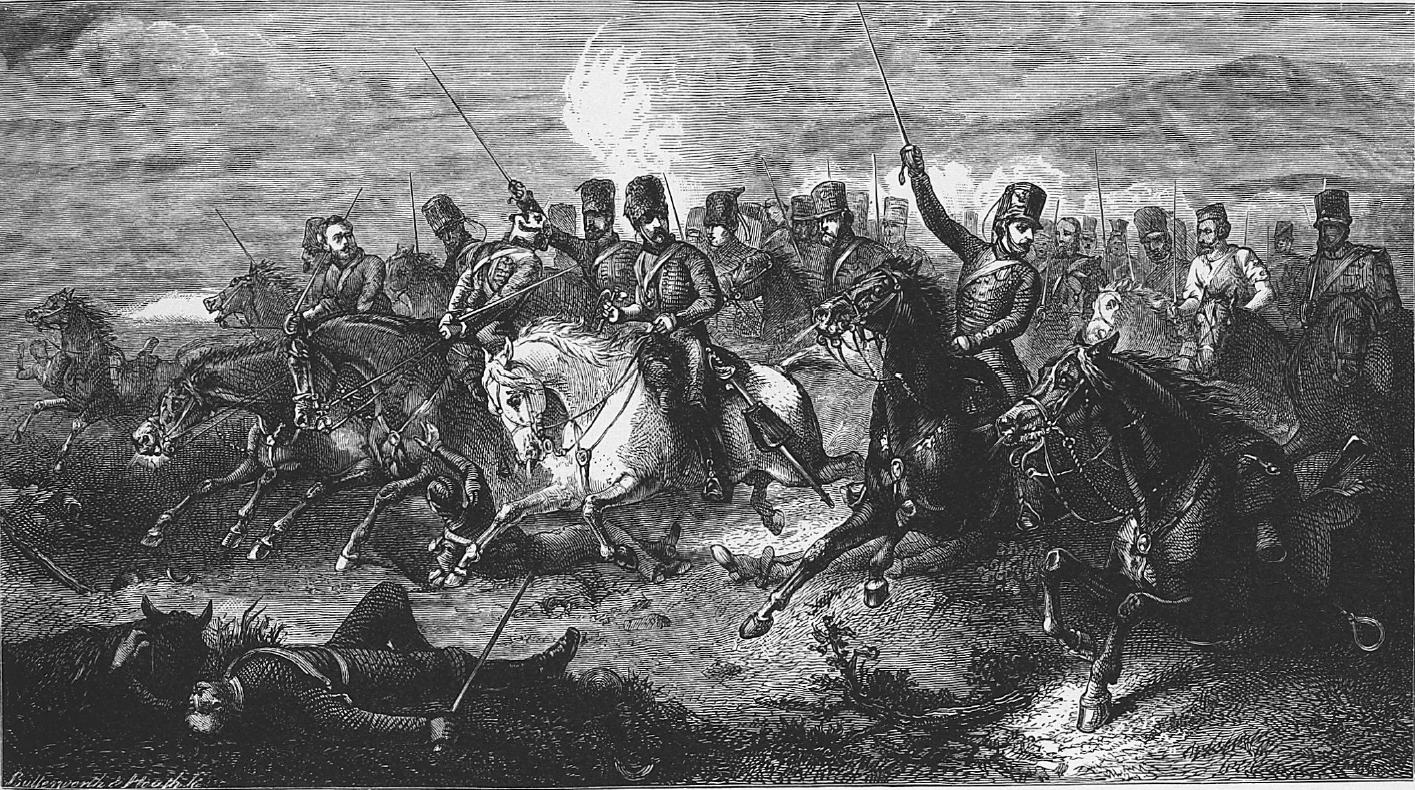
Return Through the Valley of Death engraving based on the original painting by Thomas Jones Barker

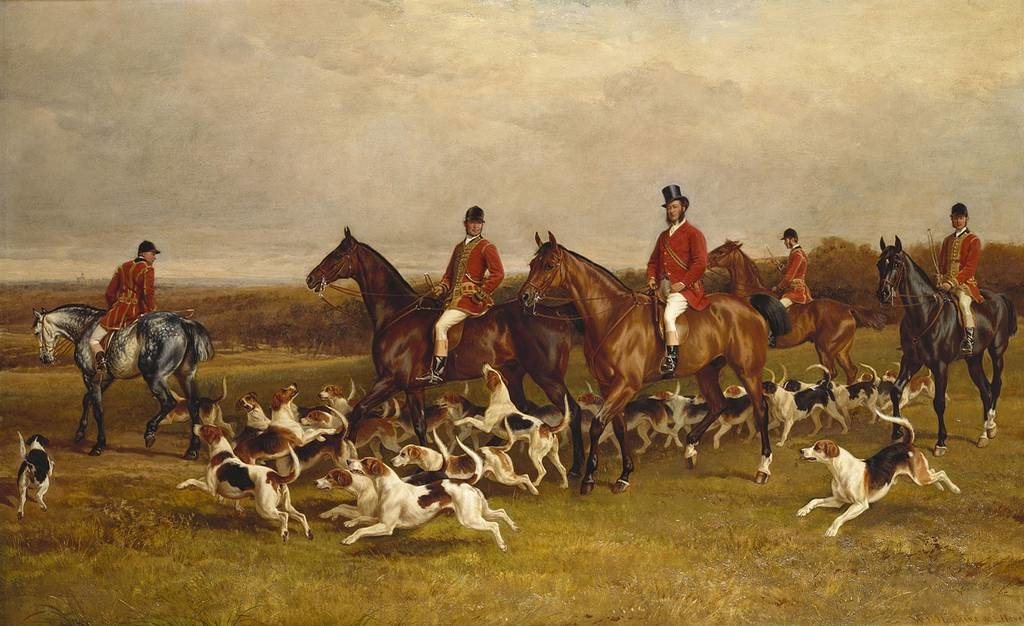
Her Majesty's Buckhounds by William Henry Hopkins

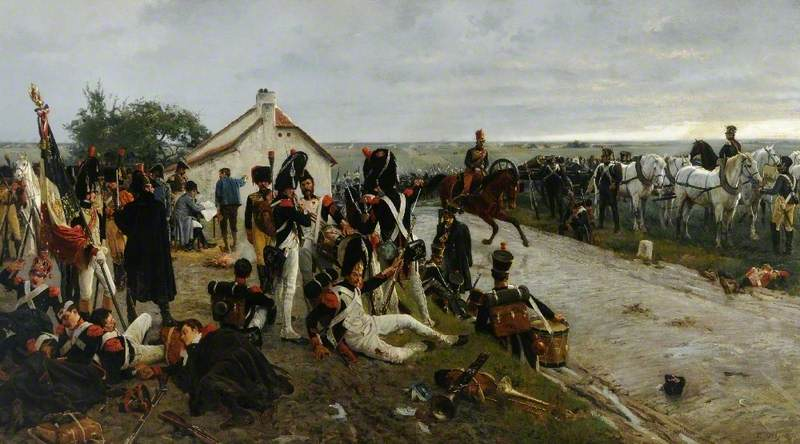
The Morning of the Battle of Waterloo by Ernest Crofts

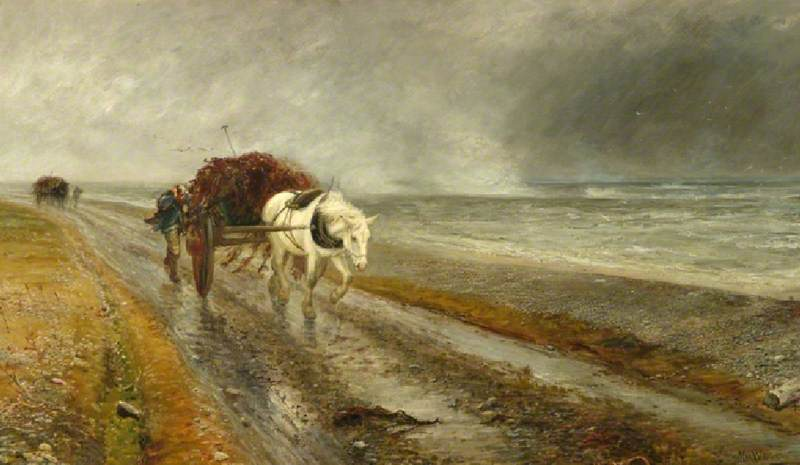
Spindrift by John MacWhirter

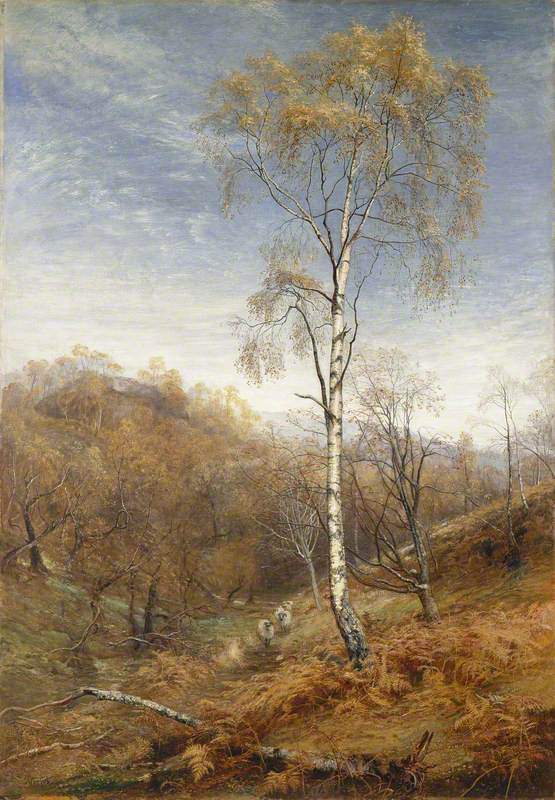
The Lady of the Woods by John MacWhirter

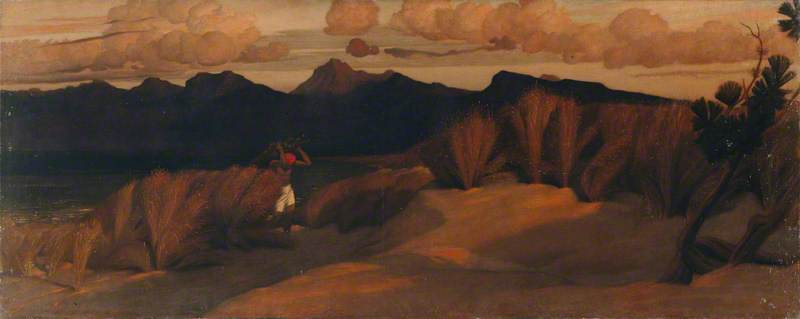
Near Viareggio, Where Shelley's Body Was Found by William Blake Richmond

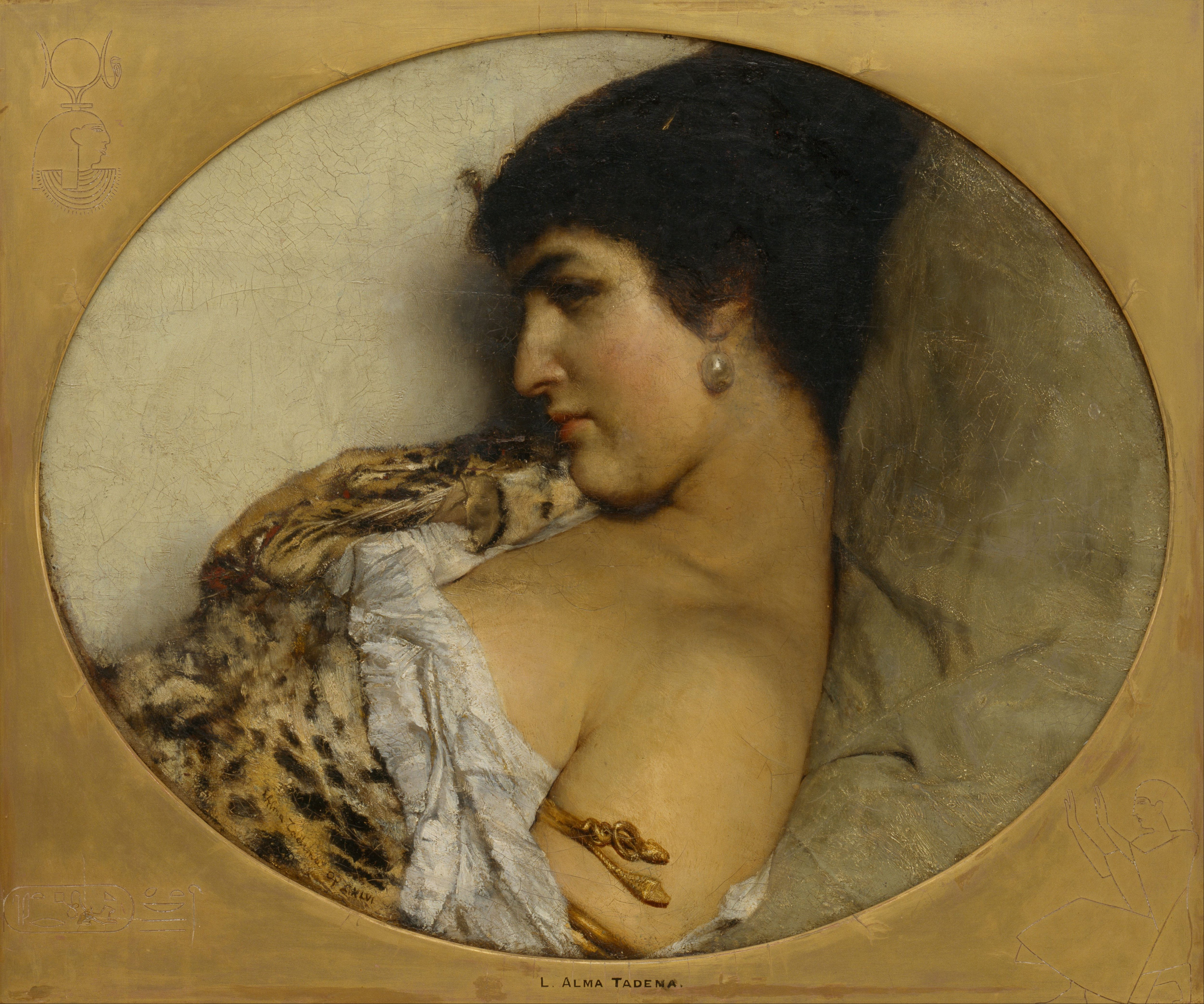
Cleopatra by Lawrence Alma-Tadema

Getting Better by John Everett Millais

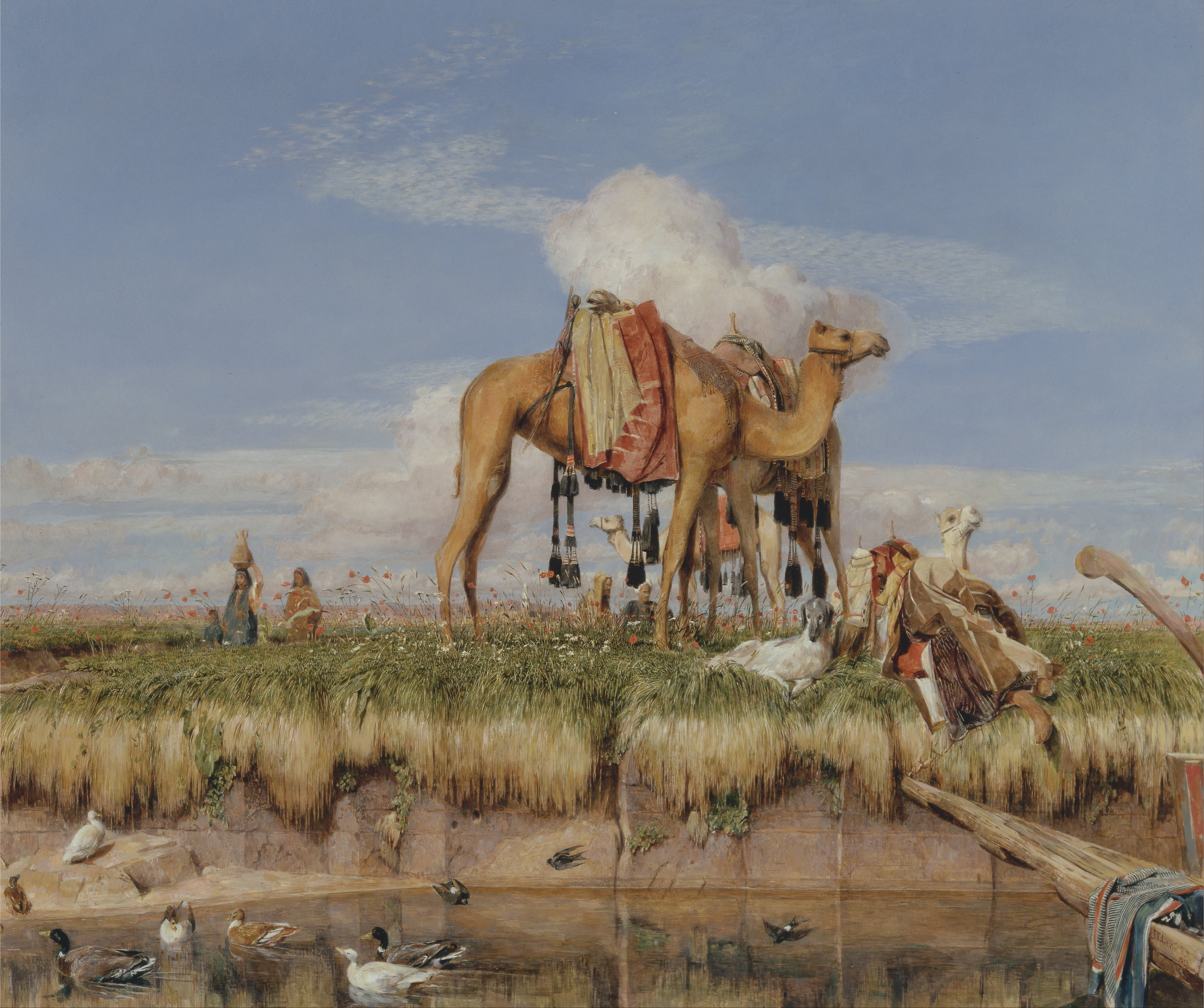
On the Banks of the Nile, Upper Egypt by John Frederick Lewis

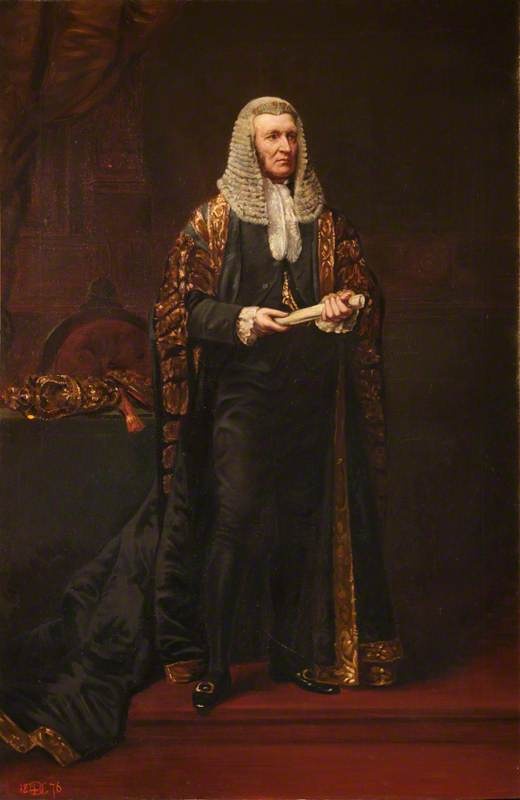
Portrait of Earl Cairns by Lowes Cato Dickinson

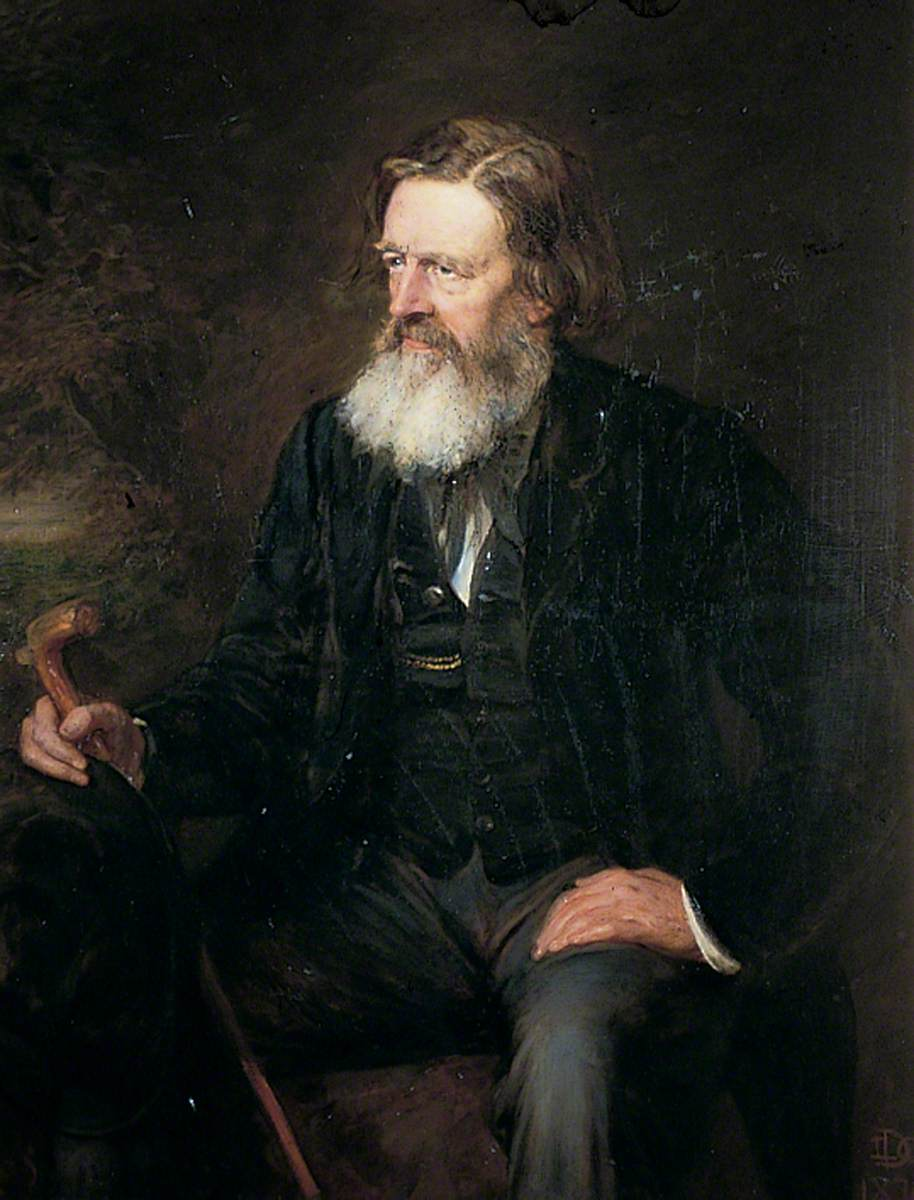
Portrait of Edmund Law Lushington by Lowes Cato Dickinson

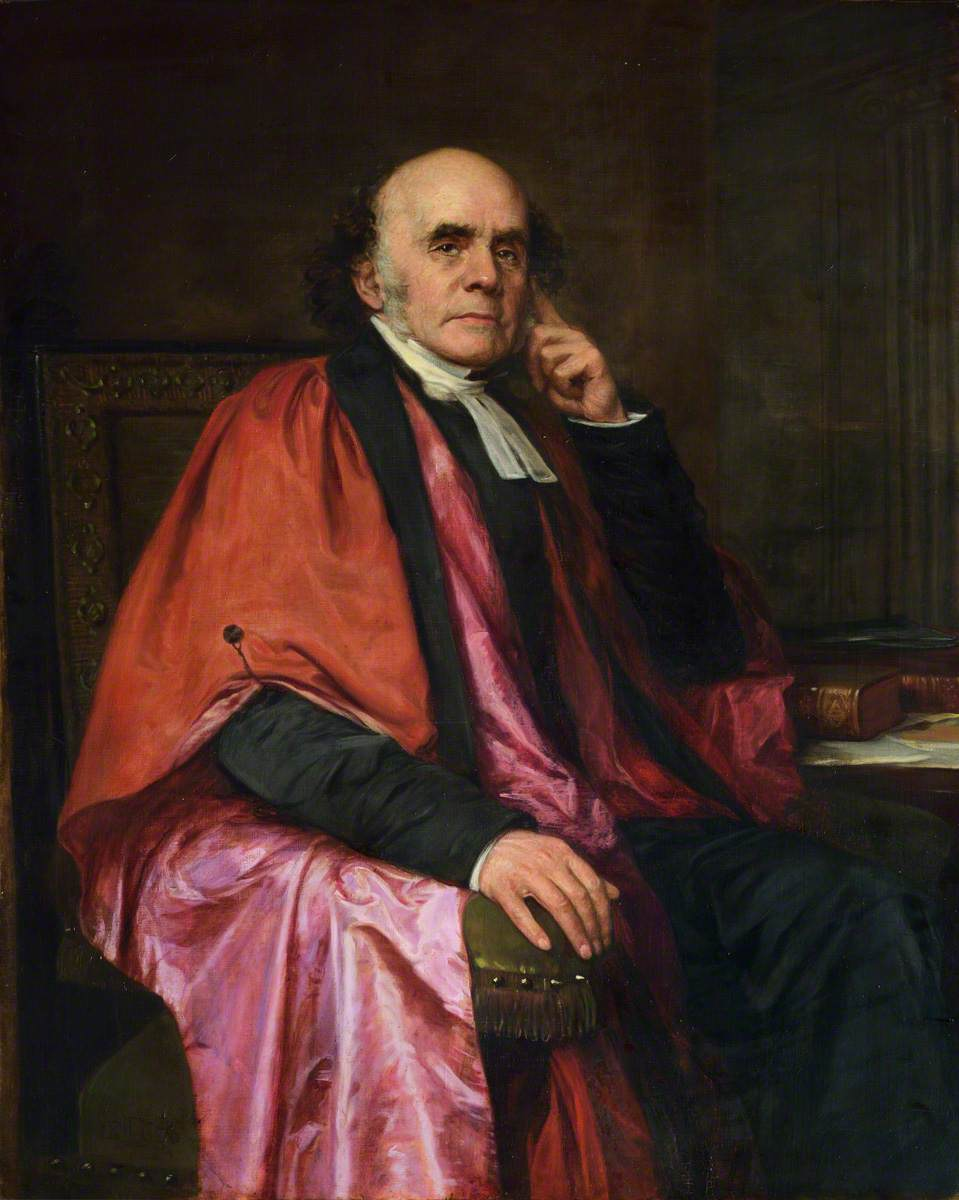
Portrait of Henry Wilkinson Cookson by Lowes Cato Dickinson

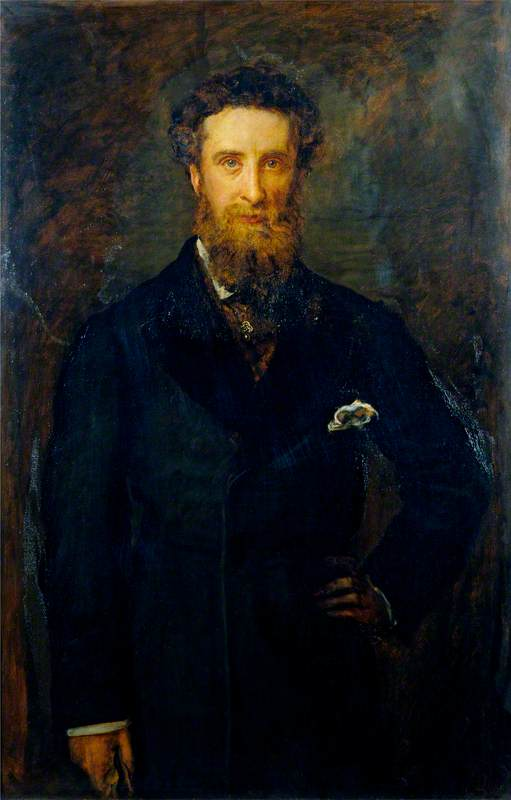
Portrait of Robert Bulwer-Lytton by John Everett Millais

Portrait of Berthe Schlesinger by John Everett Millais

Portrait of Richard Francis Burton by Frederic Leighton

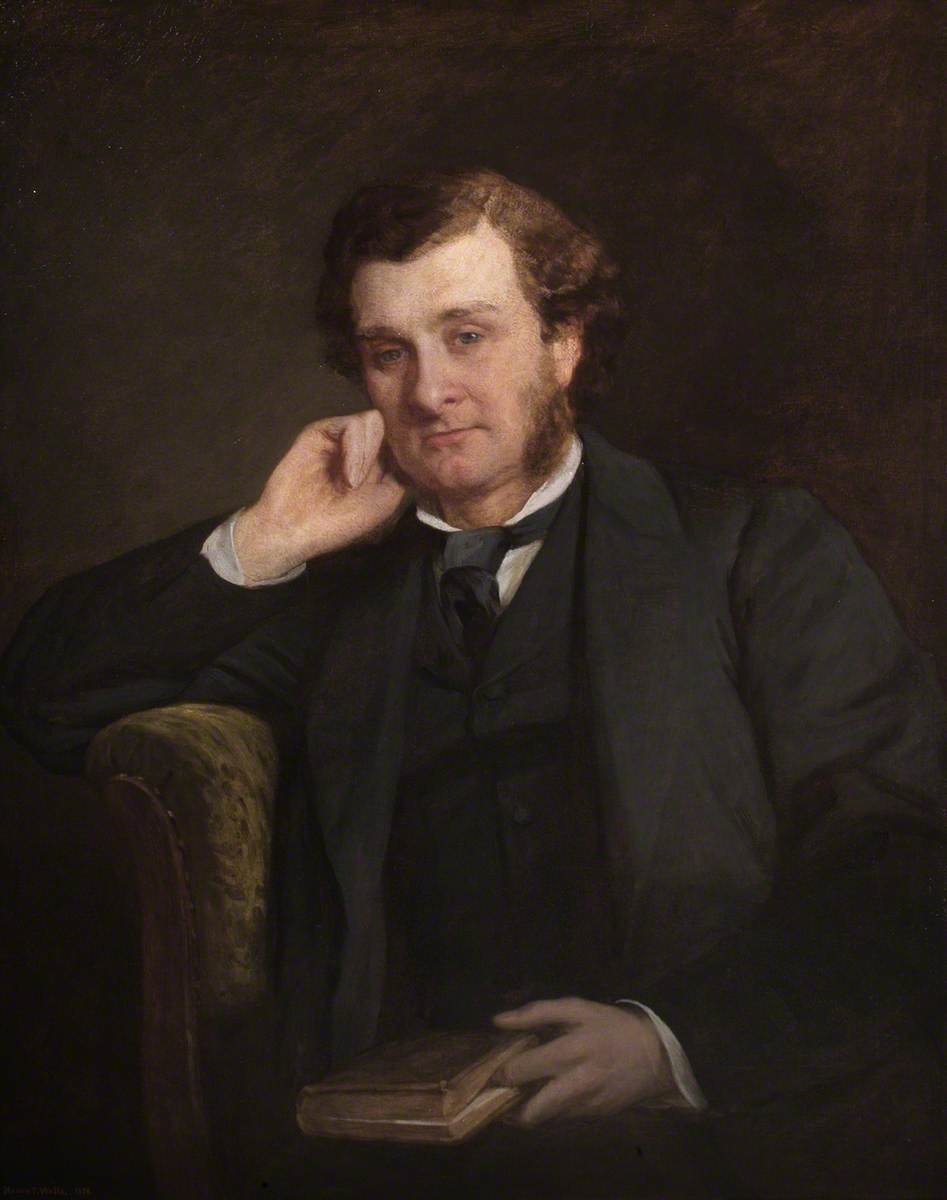
Portrait of Lionel Smith Beale by Henry Tanworth Wells

Portrait of the Earl of Milltown by Francis Grant

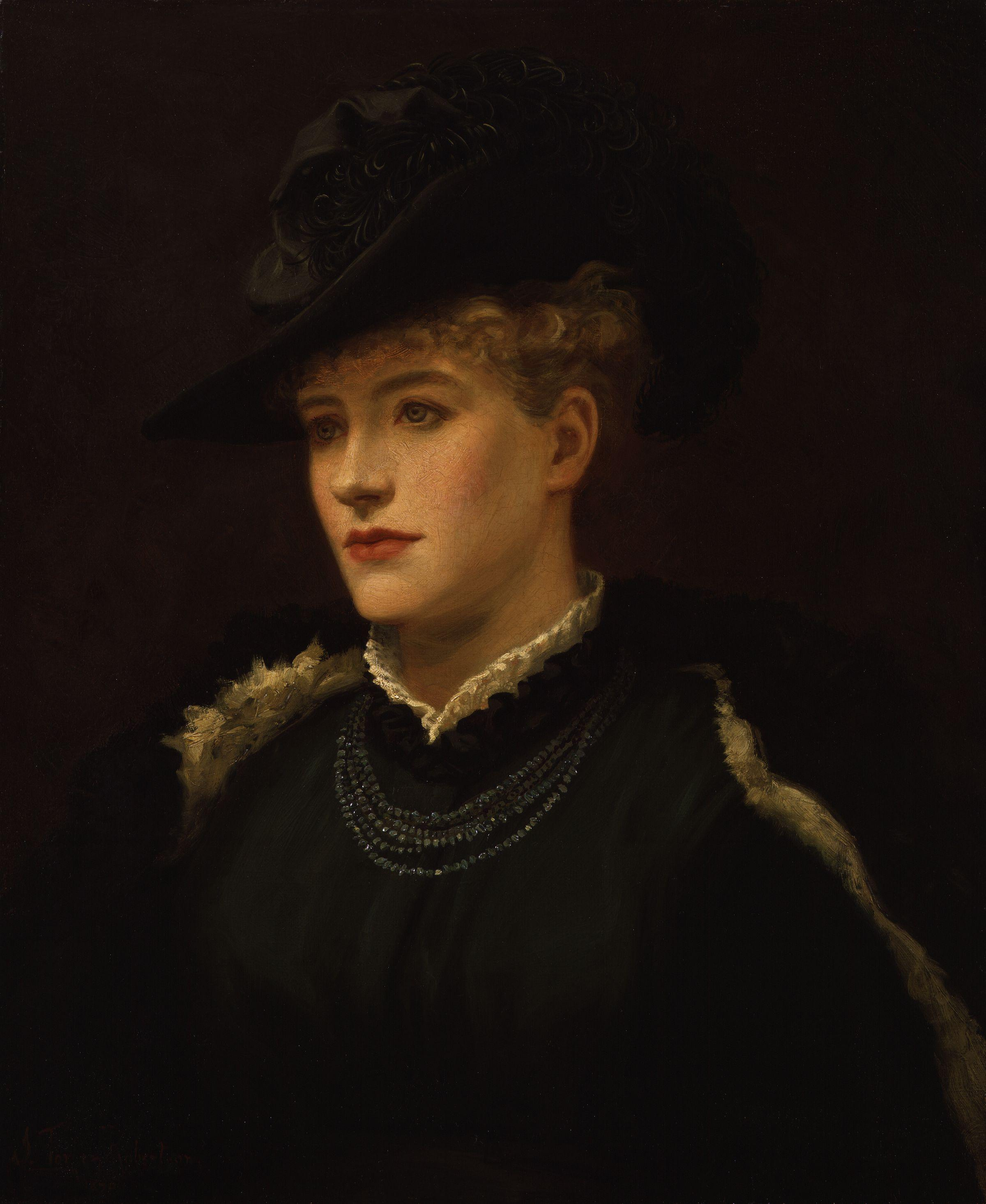
Portrait of Ellen Terry by Johnston Forbes-Robertson

== Bibliography ==
- Cusack, Tricia (ed.) Art and Identity at the Water's Edge. Taylor & Francis, 2017.
- Marshall, Nancy Rose & Warner, Malcolm. James Tissot: Victorian Life, Modern Love. Yale University Press, 1999.
