= The Convalescent =

Painting by James Tissot

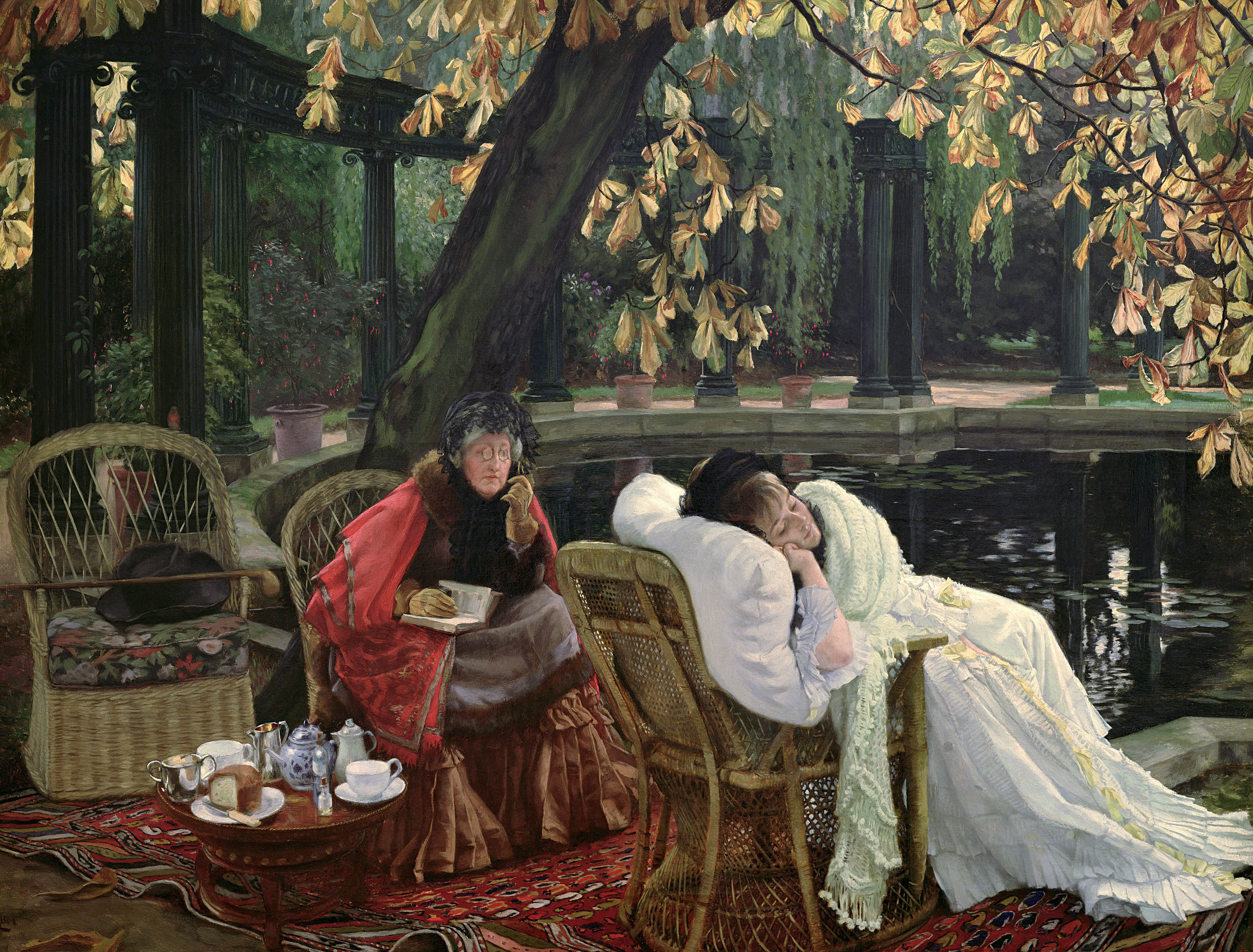
- Artist: James Tissot
- Year: 1876
- Type: Oil on canvas, genre painting
- Dimensions: 76.8 cm × 99.2 cm (30.2 in × 39.1 in)
- Location: Graves Art Gallery, Sheffield

The Convalescent is an oil painting on canvas by the French artist James Tissot, from 1876.

== History and description ==
A genre painting it shows a young woman recovering from ill health drowsing while an older woman reads aloud to her. It features Tissot's lover and frequent model Kathleen Newton, while the backdrop is the artist's own large garden at 17 Grove End Road in St John's Wood. The painting was displayed at the Royal Academy Exhibition of 1876 held at Burlington House in London. The picture is now part of the collection of the Graves Art Gallery, in Sheffield, which purchased it in 1949.

== Bibliography ==
- Marshall, Nancy Rose & Warner, Malcolm. James Tissot: Victorian Life, Modern Love. Yale University Press, 1999.
- Postle, Martin (ed.) Art of the Garden. Harry N. Abrams, 2004.
- Wentworth, Michael. James Tissot Clarendon Press, 1984.
