= Roy Bridges =

Roy Bridges may refer to:

- Roy D. Bridges Jr. (born 1943), American aviator and astronaut
- Roy Bridges (author) (1885–1952), Australian novelist
- Roy Bridges (historian) (1932–2020), British historian of exploration and Africa

== See also ==
- Roy Bridge (disambiguation)
