= Roy Bridge =

Roy Bridge may refer to:

- Roy Anthony Bridge (1921–2000), Jamaican member of the International Olympic Committee
- Roy Arthur Odell Bridge (1911–1978), English banker

== See also ==
- Roybridge, a village in Scotland
- Roy Bridges (disambiguation)
