= Edwin Forbes =

American painter

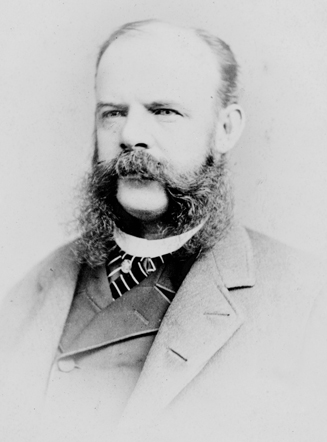
- Born: 1839; New York City
- Died: March 6, 1895 (aged 55–56); Brooklyn
- Resting place: Green-Wood Cemetery
- Known for: Landscape painter and etcher
- Notable work: Military subjects

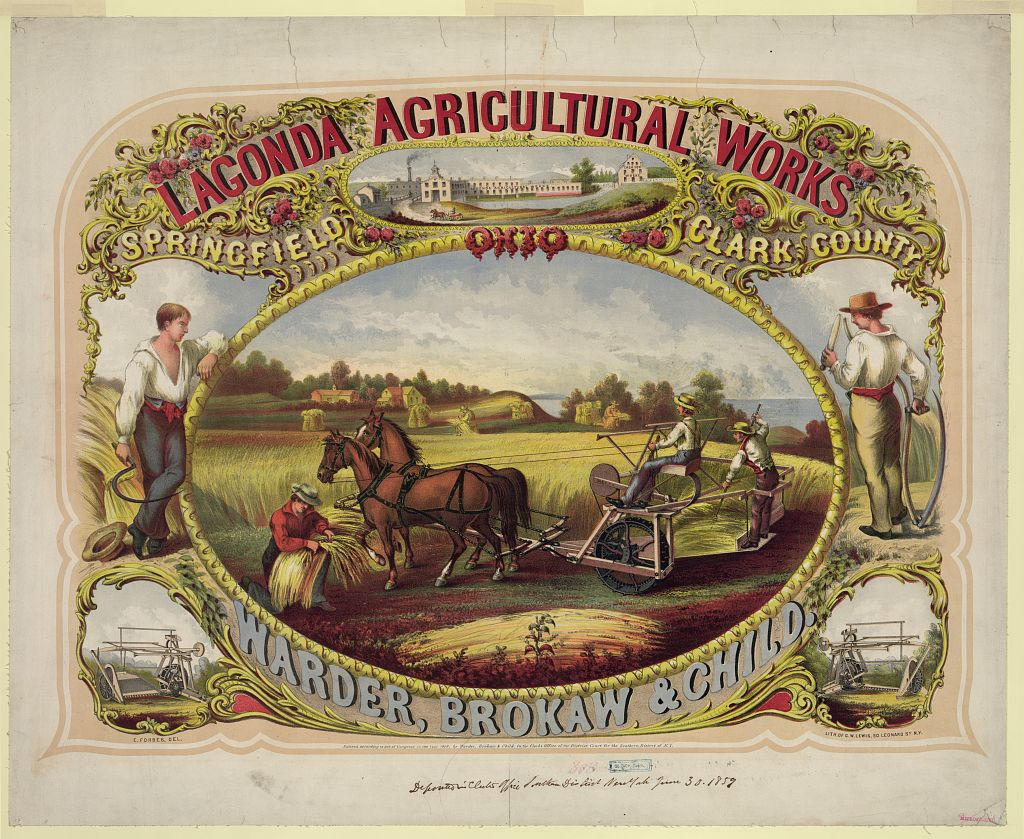
Poster by Edwin Forbes

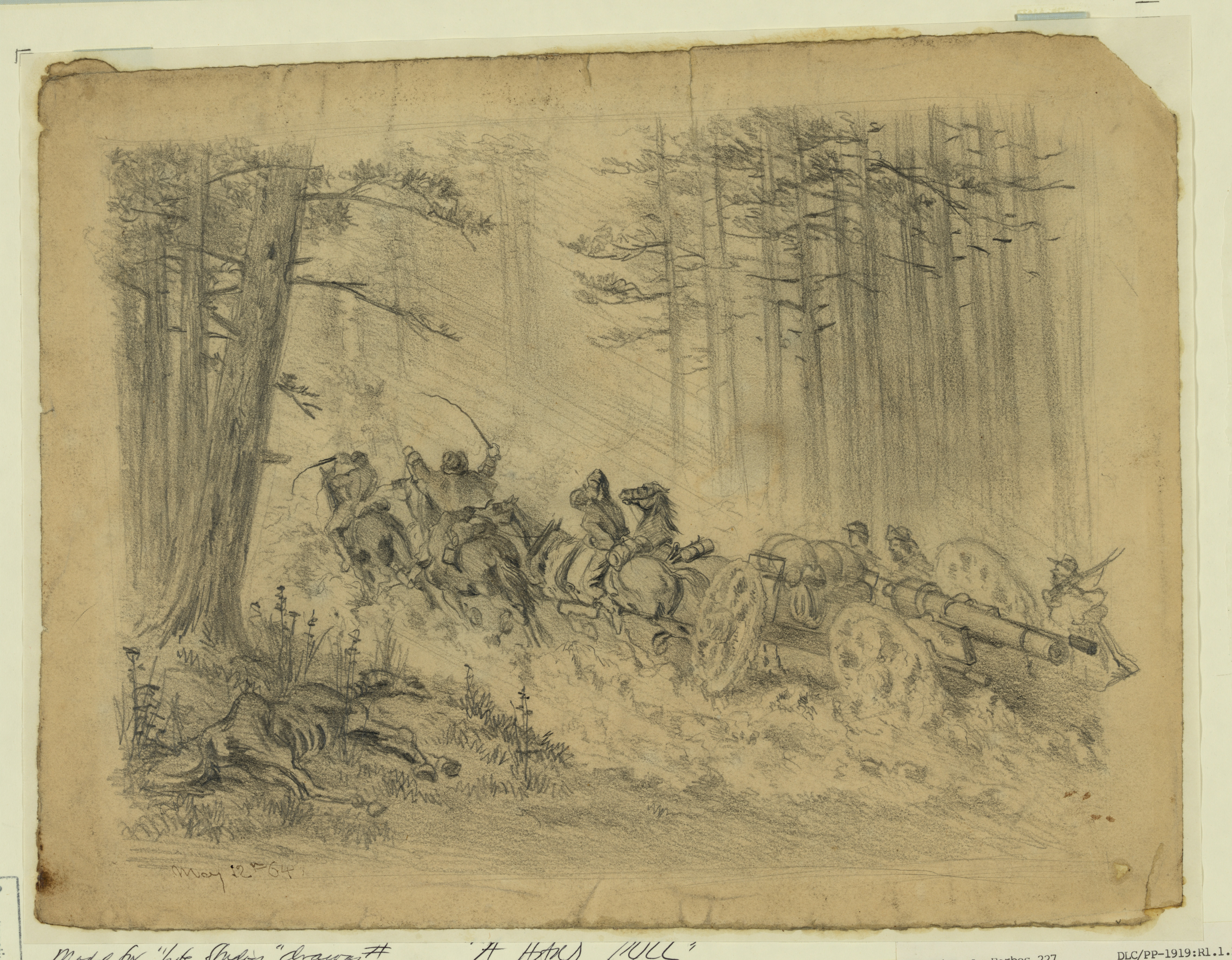
A stormy march to the Battle of Spotsylvania Court House, sketched by Edwin Forbes.

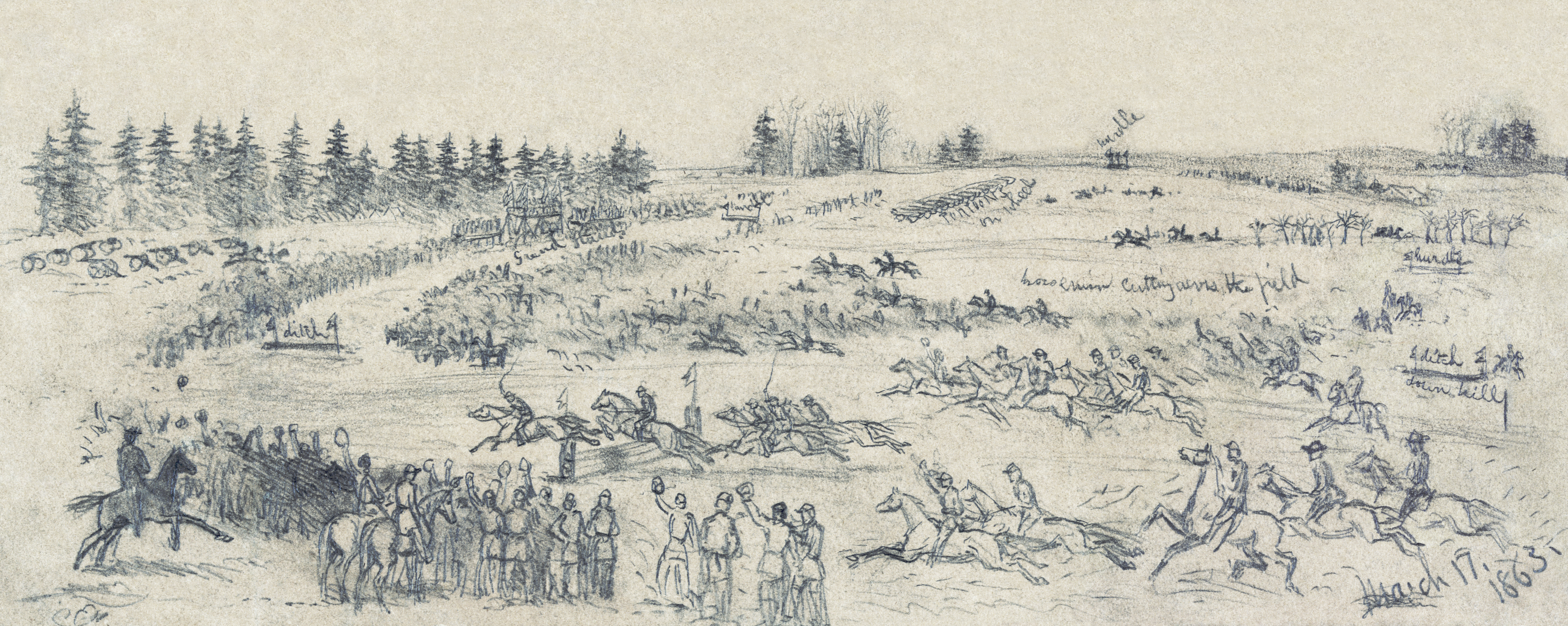
Saint Patrick's Day celebration in the Army of the Potomac. Depicts a steeplechase race among the Irish Brigade, March 17, 1863, Edwin Forbes. Digitally restored.

Edwin Austin Forbes (1839 – March 6, 1895) was an American landscape painter and etcher who first gained fame during the American Civil War for his detailed and dramatic sketches of military subjects, including battlefield combat scenes.

== Biography ==
Forbes was born in New York, studied under Arthur Fitzwilliam Tait, and began as an animal and landscape painter. During the Civil War, he was special artist for Frank Leslie's Magazine. Many of the spirited etchings he drew during the conflict were later presented by General Sherman to the government. They are now preserved in the War Office at Washington because of their historic value.

After the war, Forbes painted landscape and cattle scenes, among which are "Orange County Pasture" (1879) and "Evening—Sheep Pasture" (1881). In 1877 he was made an honorary member of the London Etching Club.

He died in 1895 in Brooklyn and is interred in Green-Wood Cemetery.
