= The Etching Club =

19th-century artists' society in London

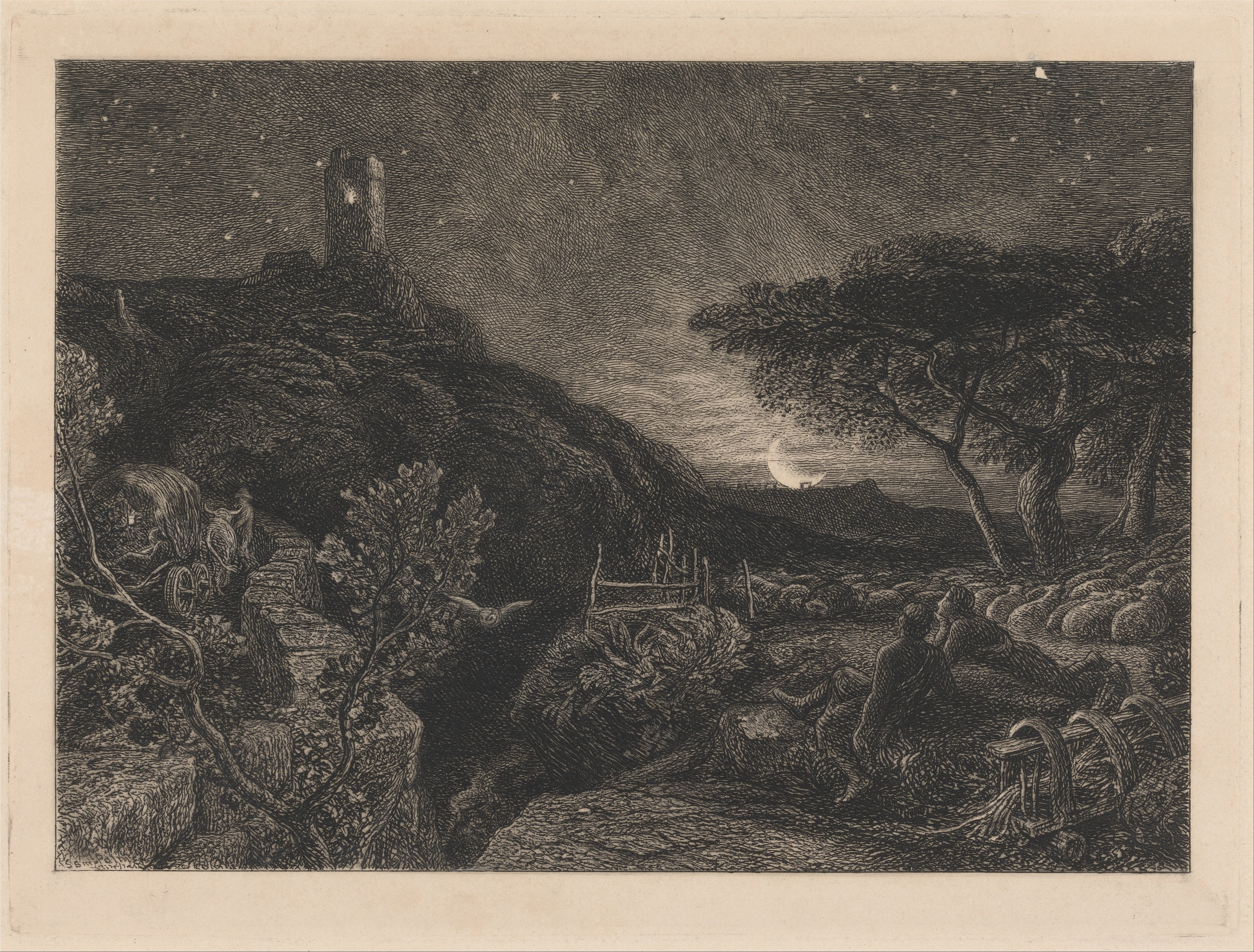
Samuel Palmer, The Lonely Tower, 1879

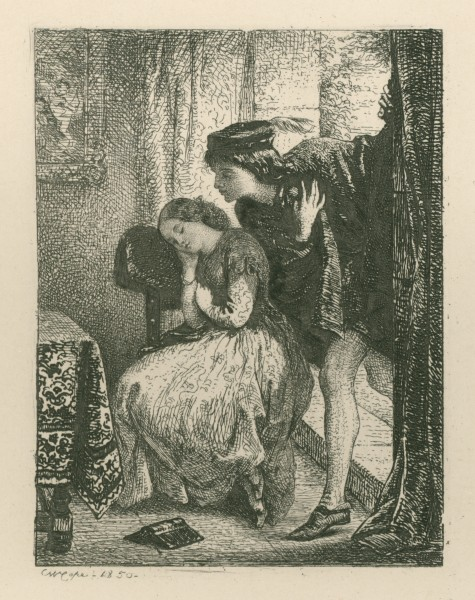
Charles West Cope, The Stolen Kiss, 1850, published by The Etching Club, 1857

The Etching Club (also known as Etching Club, the London Etching Club, and the British Etching Club; or the Junior Etching Club for its younger membership grouped separately) was an artists' society founded in London, England, in 1838 by Charles West Cope. It was part of the Etching Revival in printmaking. The club published illustrated editions of works by authors such as Oliver Goldsmith, Shakespeare, John Milton and Thomas Gray in small editions, normally using actual etchings rather reproductions of them by other techniques. It effectively ceased to exist in 1878.

== Membership ==
- Richard Ansdell
- Thomas Oldham Barlow
- Charles West Cope (1811–1890)
- Thomas Creswick
- William Charles Thomas Dobson
- Edwin Austin Forbes (1839–1895) (Honorary member)
- William Edward Frost
- Francis Seymour Haden
- James Clarke Hook
- John Callcott Horsley
- William Henry Hunt
- William Holman Hunt
- John Everett Millais
- George B. O'Neill
- Samuel Palmer
- Richard Redgrave (1804–1888)
- Frank Stone
- John Frederick Tayler (1806–1889)
- Henry James Townsend (1810–1890)
- Thomas Webster

== Publications of The Etching Club ==
- Oliver Goldsmith. The Deserted Village (Joseph Cundall, 1855 with reproductions – first pub. 1841 with the original etchings).
- Oliver Goldsmith. The Vicar of Wakefield.
- Bolton Corney. Goldsmith's poetical works (1845).
- William Shakespeare. Songs of Shakespeare (1843).
- William Shakespeare. The Ballads of Shakespeare (1852).
- John Milton. L'Allegro and Il ponseroso (1849).
- Thomas Gray. Elegy written in a country churchyard (1847).
- The Etching Club. Etched thoughts (1844)
- The Etching Club. Etchings for the Art-Union of London by The Etching Club (London: Art Union of London, 1857).
- The Etching Club. A selection of etchings by the etchings club (Joseph Cundall, 1865).

== Publications of the Junior Etching Club ==
- Junior Etching Club. Passages from Modern English Poets (Forty-Seven Etchings) (London: William Tegg, 1875); Alaric Alexander Watts.

== References and bibliography ==
- Cope, H. W. "Reminiscences of Charles West Cope, R. A." (London: Bentley, 1891) p. 35 ff.
- Ray, Gordon Norton. The Illustrator and the Book in England from 1790 to 1914 Dover Publications, 1992) p. 139 ff.
- Lang, Gladys Engel & Lang, Kurt. Etched in memory: the building and survival of artistic reputation (University of Illinois Press, 2001) p. 37 ff.
- Fredericksen, A. The Etching Club of London: a taste for painters' etchings (exhibition catalogue, 2002).
