= Hakluyt Society =

British text publication society

- Logo depicting Ferdinand Magellan's ship Victoria, which circumnavigated the globe in 1519–22
- Founded: 15 December 1846
- Founder: William Desborough Cooley
- Country of origin: United Kingdom
- Headquarters location: London
- Publication types: Books
- Nonfiction topics: Primary records of historic voyages, travels and other geographical material
- Official website: www.hakluyt.com

The Hakluyt Society is a text publication society, founded in 1846 and based in London, England, which publishes scholarly editions of primary records of historic voyages, travels and other geographical material. In addition to its publishing role, the Society organises and participates in meetings, symposia and conferences relating to the history of geographical exploration and cultural encounter. It is a registered charity and a non-profitmaking institution administered by a voluntary team of council members and officers. Membership is open to all with an interest in its aims.

The Society is named after Richard Hakluyt (1552–1616), a collector and editor of narratives of voyages and travels and other documents relating to English interests overseas. The Society's logo, which appears on the cover of all volumes, is a vignette of Ferdinand Magellan's ship, the Victoria.

== Foundation ==
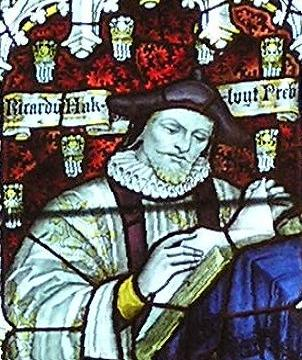
Richard Hakluyt, after whom the Society is named, pictured in a stained glass window of c. 1905 in Bristol Cathedral.

The Society was created at a meeting convened in the London Library, St James's Square, on 15 December 1846. Under the chairmanship of the geologist Sir Roderick Murchison, it established an eight-man steering group which included the geographer and historian William Desborough Cooley; the Army medical officer Andrew Smith; the naval officer and surveyor Sir Charles Malcolm; the antiquary Bolton Corney; the British Museum Principal Librarian Sir Henry Ellis; the physicist and mathematician William Rowan Hamilton, FRS; and John Edward Gray, Keeper of Zoology at the British Museum. Cooley had previously criticised the Royal Geographical Society for relying too heavily on contemporary materials in the solution of geographical problems, arguing that the scientific study of geography should involve a far wider analysis and appreciation of earlier sources. He took the major role during the Society's formative period, assisted by Corney and Smith, while Murchison occupied little more than a figurehead position.

Cooley had proposed that the society should be known as the "Columbus Society", but at the inaugural Council Meeting on 26 January 1847 it was decided that it be named in commemoration of Richard Hakluyt. Not only did Hakluyt's name as a recorder of voyages, rather than an explorer in his own right, better reflect the society's aims, but it also proclaimed its central ambition, which was to advance Hakluyt's work into the modern age. A resolution was adopted whereby the Society would print and circulate to its members, for a subscription of one guinea per annum, rare accounts of voyages, travels and geographical records dating from any period prior to William Dampier's circumnavigation (effectively before the end of the 17th century). Meetings were initially held in a room at the London Library, but in 1849 transferred to the offices of the Society's printer in St Martin's Lane, and from 1850 in Great Queen Street. From 1872 they were held at the Royal Geographical Society's premises, originally in Savile Row and subsequently in Kensington Gore.

A General Meeting on 4 March 1847 agreed a constitution and a list of works to be published. The Society was to be governed by a President (Murchison), two vice-presidents (Charles Malcolm and Revd H. H. Milman), a Secretary (Cooley) and 17 elected council members. The first year's Council included – in addition to the members of the original steering group – Charles Darwin, Charles Beke, Captain Charles Ramsay Drinkwater Bethune and the scholar Richard Henry Major.

The Society attracted 220 members in its first two years. Its first publication, Bethune's Observations of Sir Richard Hawkins, appeared in December 1847; followed by Major's Select Letters of Christopher Columbus (printed 1847 but published in January 1848). Richard Hakluyt's Divers Voyages touching the Discovery of America, which the Society had intended for its inaugural publication, was postponed until 1850. Meanwhile, Sir Robert Schomburgk's edition of Ralegh's voyage to Guiana had appeared (1849), together with Cooley's Sir Francis Drake his Voyage (1849), Thomas Rundall's Voyages towards the North-West, and Major's Historie of Travaile into Virginia Britannia. Early print-runs were relatively small – around 250 copies to satisfy the existing membership, with a few to spare – at a cost to the Society in the region of £50–60.

== Later development ==
Murchison served as president until his death in 1871, although his position was largely honorary. He was succeeded by Sir David Dundas (1871–77), a lawyer and politician, and then by Sir Henry Yule (1877–89), an Oriental scholar and former East India Company soldier. Yule took a more direct interest in the editing of the society's publications than either Murchison or Dundas, and it was his decision that all future volumes should be indexed. R. H. Major, who had taken over as secretary from Cooley in 1849, held the office until 1858 when his place was taken by the geographer, historian and expedition promoter Clements Markham. Markham served as secretary 1858–87, and as president 1889–1909, and personally edited no fewer than 29 volumes. From 1893 he was assisted by William Foster, the East India Company historian and India Office archivist, who served as secretary until 1902. The first permanent treasurer, appointed in 1908, was Edward Heawood, the Royal Geographical Society's librarian: he remained in office for thirty-eight years.

In 1908, the final year of Markham's rule, the Society broke with tradition and published its first post-1700 text, Bolton Corney's Voyage of Captain Don Felipe Gonzalez.

In 1909 Markham was succeeded as president by Sir Albert Gray, an ex-member of the Ceylon Civil Service. From this time onwards the Society began to extend its activity beyond that of publication. It supported the establishment of a memorial to Richard Hakluyt in Bristol Cathedral in 1911, and in 1914 Gray represented the Society on the British Academy Committee involved in organising the Shakespeare Tercentenary. The period also saw the emergence of women as editors and translators, notably Bertha Phillpotts, Lavinia Mary Anstey and Zelia Nuttall. Membership increased, largely on account of institutional subscriptions which by 1911 accounted for half of the 440 members. Sir William Foster, the former Secretary, served as President 1928–1945, and then as vice-president until his death in 1951. Foster's skill in annotating rubbed off on his editors and resulted in a period distinguished by considerable improvements in the quality of the Society's publications, together with a steady growth in membership to more than 2000. Foster was succeeded in 1945 by Edward Lynam, Superintendent of the Map Room at the British Museum (now the British Library) and the first of a line of post-war presidents whose terms of office were restricted to a period of five years. In the post-war period the Society's publication programme benefited from the labours of those of its voluntary officers who also took on editorial responsibilities, including R. A. Skelton, Eila Campbell, Terence Armstrong, Sarah Tyacke, Michael Brennan, Robin Law and Will Ryan.

== Publications ==
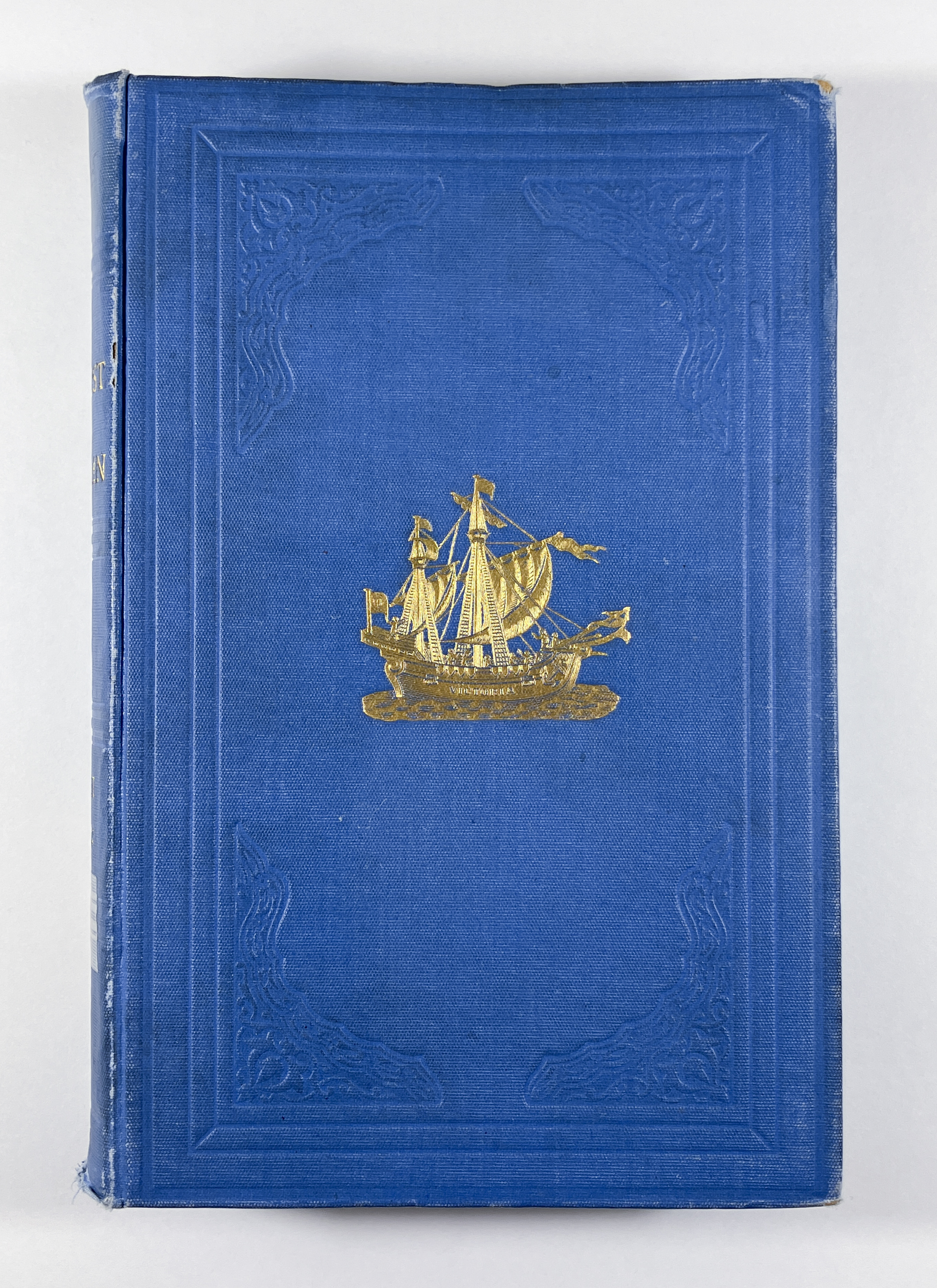
Slipcase containing the Hakluyt Society's 1910 publication The True History of the Conquest of New Spain... (2nd series, no. 25, vol. III)

The main activity of the Society is the publication of scholarly editions of primary sources on the voyages and travels undertaken by individuals in many parts of the globe. These include early accounts dealing with the geography, ethnology and natural history of the regions visited. The Society has to date published over 200 editions in some 350 volumes. All editions are published in English.

Although many of the Society's past editions relate to British ventures, with documentary sources in English, the majority concern non-British enterprises and are based on texts in languages other than English. Translations from Spanish, Portuguese, Italian, French or Dutch have regularly appeared, and occasional translations from Russian, Greek, Latin, Amharic, Mandarin, Persian or Arabic. The translation in which the material is presented is normally a fresh version, but has sometimes been an earlier rendering, checked and corrected as necessary.

All editions contain scholarly annotation to elucidate the complexities of the text, and to place it in its wider historical context. Volumes are produced in a standard binding, and generally contain maps and contemporary illustrations.

Editions have dealt with the following explorers: Ibn Battuta, Bernal Díaz del Castillo, Fabian Gottlieb von Bellingshausen, Pedro Cieza de León, John Cabot, Christopher Columbus, Thomas Dallam, John Covel, Ferdinand Magellan, Cosmas Indicopleustes, James Cook, Vasco da Gama, Semyon Dezhnev, Francis Drake, Humphrey Gilbert, Jean-François de La Pérouse, Ludwig Leichhardt, Jan Huyghen van Linschoten, Ma Huan, Olaus Magnus, Arthur J. M. Jephson, Jens Munk, William of Rubruck, and George Vancouver.

The Society published 100 volumes in its First Series, from 1847 to 1899. The Second Series ran from 1899 to 1998, and accounted for 190 volumes. The Third Series, in a larger format, began in 1999, and by 2021 had reached 38 volumes. These included a 3-volume journal of The Malaspina Expedition, published in association with the Museo Naval de Madrid.

Currently, two volumes are published on average each year.

=== Extra Series ===
In addition to its regular series, the Society publishes a separate Extra Series, comprising books which are too expensive in their production to be freely distributed, but which are made available to members at reduced prices. Publications of this type first appeared in 1903–07 with C. R. Beazley's annotated extracts from Hakluyt, and the multi-volume MacLehose editions of Hakluyt's Principal Navigations and Purchas's Pilgrimes. These are now treated as volumes 1–33 of the Extra Series, although only a few sets of the MacLehose printings appeared in Hakluyt Society binding, and none carried the Extra Series imprint. The concept was revived and formally designated in the 1950s with the publication of the Journals of Captain James Cook (4 volumes, 1955–67, numbered as Extra Series vols 34–37), followed by other titles including the monumental Charts & Coastal Views of Captain Cook's Voyages (1988–92). The Extra Series had reached 47 volumes by the end of 2012.

== Other activities ==
The Society's Annual General Meeting (AGM) and Annual Lecture were held at the Royal Geographical Society until 2011, since when they have been held at the University of Notre Dame, London Centre. In 2020 and 2021 the AGM was held online via Zoom. The Society's website hosts a discussion group, regional research guides to its published volumes and hosts the peer-reviewed Journal of the Hakluyt Society.

== Presidents ==
- 1847–71: Sir Roderick Murchison
- 1871–77: Sir David Dundas
- 1877–89: Sir Henry Yule
- 1889–1909 Sir Clements Markham
- 1909–28: Sir Albert Gray
- 1928–45: Sir William Foster
- 1945–50: Edward Lynam
- 1950–54: Malcolm Letts
- 1955–59: Professor J. N. L. Baker
- 1959–64: Sir Alan Burns
- 1964–69: Sir Gilbert Laithwaite
- 1969–72: C. F. Beckingham
- 1972–78: Esmond S. de Beer
- 1978–82: Glyndwr Williams
- 1982–87: David Beers Quinn
- 1987–92: Sir Harold Smedley
- 1992–97: Professor Paul E. H. Hair
- 1997–2002: Sarah Tyacke
- 2002–08: Professor Roy Bridges
- 2008–11: Professor Will Ryan
- 2011–16: Captain Mike Barritt
- 2016–21: Professor Jim Bennett
- 2021–present: Dr Gloria Clifton

== American Friends of the Hakluyt Society ==
A sister organisation, the American Friends of the Hakluyt Society, was founded in 1996 at the John Carter Brown Library located on the campus of Brown University. The American Friends was founded in conjunction with the 150th anniversary celebration of the Hakluyt Society. The Rhode Island merchant John Carter Brown (1797–1874), was the first American to join the Society as a charter member in 1846.

The American Friends was a non-profit corporation with objectives similar to those of the Hakluyt Society in London, but with a focus on the history of the Americas. It promoted and helped provide financial support for the society's publications. The group had fallen into abeyance by 2025.

== Archives ==
The archives of the society are kept at the British Library. These include Council Minutes, Committee papers, administrative records and financial papers, as well as correspondence and other papers.
