= James Clarke Hook =

English painter (1819–1907)

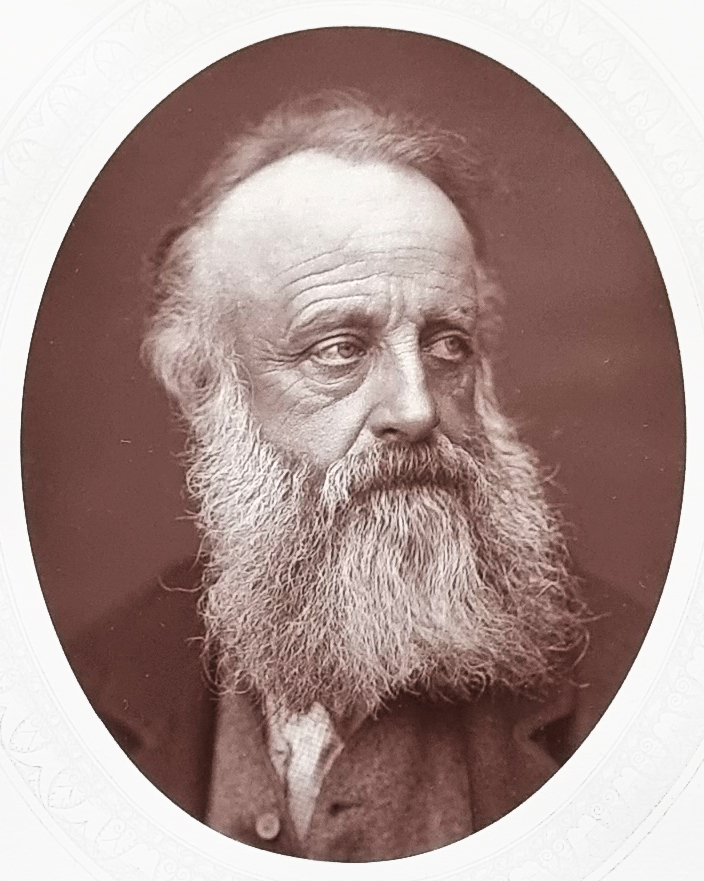
- Portrait of James Clarke Hook, Woodburytype, c. 1880
- Born: James Clarke Hook; 21 November 1819; London
- Died: 14 April 1907 (aged 87); Silverbeck, Surrey
- Education: Royal Academy, London
- Known for: Marine, History Painting and genre

James Clarke Hook RA (21 November 1819 – 14 April 1907) was an English painter and etcher of marine, genre and historical scenes, and landscapes.

== Life ==
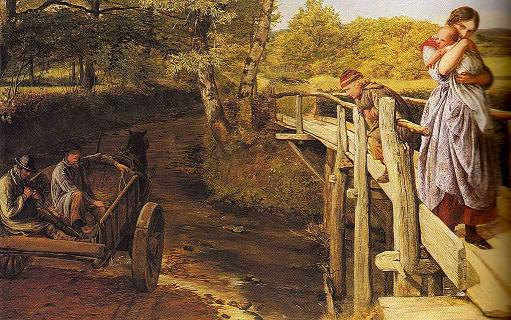
The Brook (1859)

Hook was born in London, the son of James Hook, a draper and one time Judge of the Mixed Commission Court in Sierra Leone. His mother was the second daughter of Bible scholar Dr Adam Clarke – hence the painter's second name. Young Hook's first taste of the sea was on board the Berwick smacks which took him on his way to Wooler. He drew with rare facility, and determined to become an artist, practiced his work, on his own initiative, for more than a year in the sculpture galleries of the British Museum. Still in his youth, he also had some advice by John Jackson and John Constable.

In 1836, Hook was admitted as a student to the Royal Academy, London, where he worked for three years. His first picture, called The Hard Task, was exhibited in 1839, and represented a girl helping her sister with a lesson. In 1842, Hook's second exhibited work was a portrait of Master J. Finch Smith. In 1844 he was represented at the exhibition at Westminster Hall with a design called "Satan in Paradise" to compete for the fresco decorations of the new Palace of Westminster but was not selected or won a prize. In 1844 the academy showed his "Pamphilius relating his Story" (inspired by the Decameron), which consisted of a meadow scene in bright light, with sumptuous women, richly clad, reclining on the grass.

== Exhibitions ==
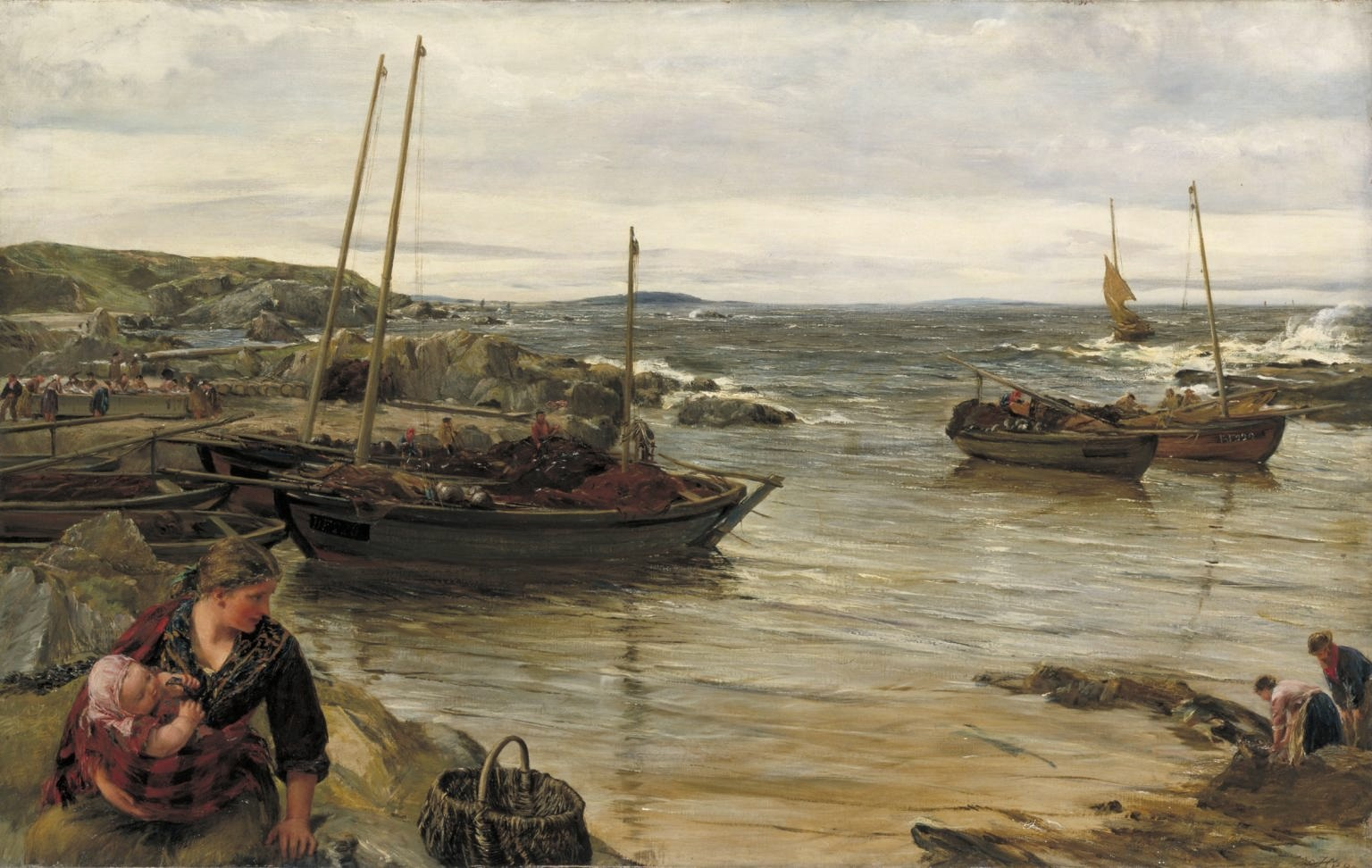
Home with the tide (1880)

In 1844 and 1845 the British Institution exhibited two of Hook's paintings – subjects taken from Shakespeare and Burns, which, with the above, showed him able to handle themes of romantic sentiment and the picturesque which were then in vogue, but in an original and vigorous manner. "The Song of Olden Times" (Royal Academy, 1845) marked the artist's future path distinctly in most technical respects. It was in this year Hook won the academy gold medal for "The Finding of the Body of Harold."

A travelling studentship in painting was awarded to Hook for Rizpah watching the dead sons of Saul in 1846, and he went to Italy for three years, having married fellow artist, Rosalie Burton, before leaving England. Rosalie's diaries present vivid pictures of their life in Italy and later. Hook passed through Paris, worked diligently for some time in the Louvre, traversed Switzerland, and, though be stayed only part of three years in Italy, gained much from studies of Titian and other Venetians.

The influence of these old masters dominated the future coloration of Hooke's pictures, and he applied the artistic lessons learned from his travels to the painting of romantic subjects and those English themes of land and sea which became his trademarks. A Dream of Ancient Venice (RA, 1848), Bayard of Brescia (R.A., 1849), Venice (BI, 1849) and other works, won him an Associateship of the Royal Academy in 1850, and he gained full membership in 1860. In 1850, he also became a member of the Etching Club.

== Genre paintings ==
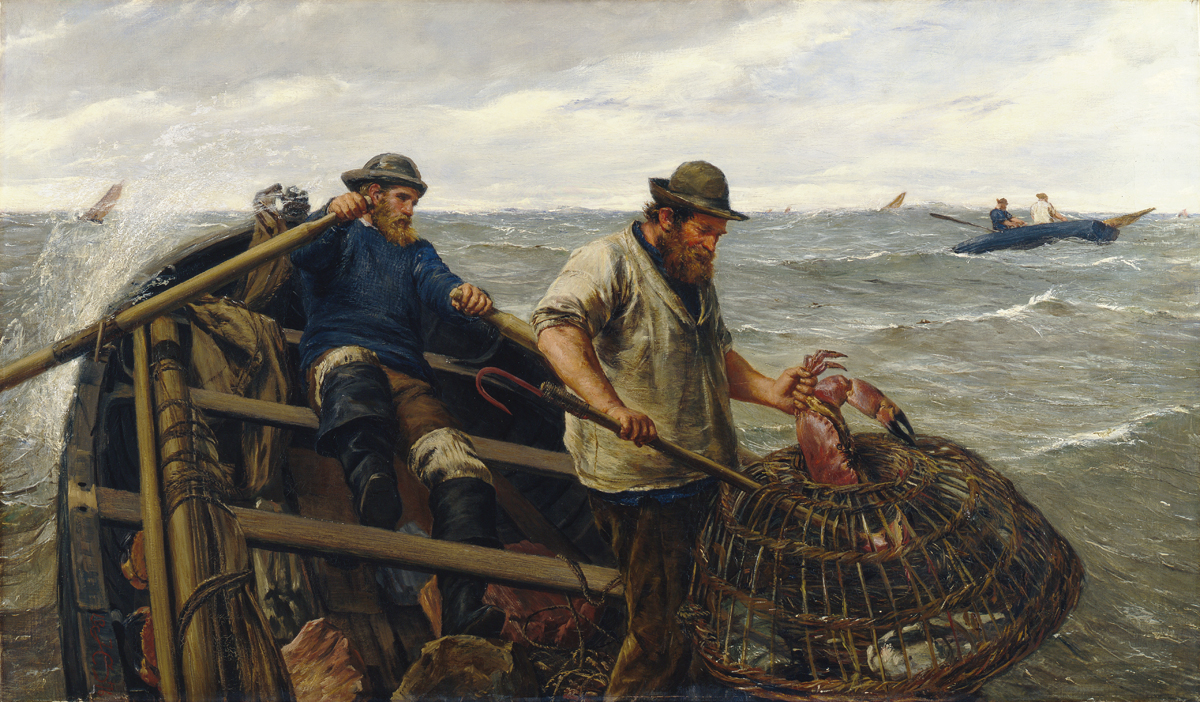
Crabbers (1876)

Soon after, he abandoned History Painting and turned his attention to genre depictions in rural landscapes like A Rest by the Wayside and A Few Minutes to Wait before Twelve o'clock (both exhibited 1854). Several visits to Clovelly in Devon prompted him to adopt coastal scenes as his main motif and showed the hardship and rewards of life by the sea. Some early examples are "A Signal on the Horizon" (1857), "A Widow's Son going to Sea," "The Ship-boy's Letter," "Children's Children are the Crown of Old Men," "A Coast-boy gathering Eggs," a scene at Lundy; "Luff, Boy!" (1859), "The Book, Stand Clear! O Well for the Fishermans Boy!" (1860), "Leaving Cornwall for the Whitby Fishing," and "Sea Urchins". He painted these types of scenes so frequently that his coastal paintings were soon dubbed "Hookscapes".

In 1857, Hook left London to settle in rural Surrey around Godalming. In 1866 he built his country house "Silverbeck" near Churt where he lived for the rest of his life. He was a frequent traveller, however, and searched out picturesque coastal areas in Scotland, Wales, Devon and Cornwall, and also abroad in Brittany and the Netherlands. The more remote and unknown the place the better. There he painted en plein air but put the final touches to each picture back home.

Hook continued to exhibit every year until 1902. He died at Silverbeck in 1907. Two of his sons were also artists: Allan James Hook (1853–1946), a marine painter, and Bryan Hook (1856–1925), an animal and bird painter.

== Works ==
Artwork by Hook is held at the Tate Gallery, Royal Academy of Arts and Guildhall Art Gallery in London, and in the major public collections in Manchester, Liverpool, and Aberdeen. A chronology of his exhibited works can be found at the James Clarke Hook website.

Works

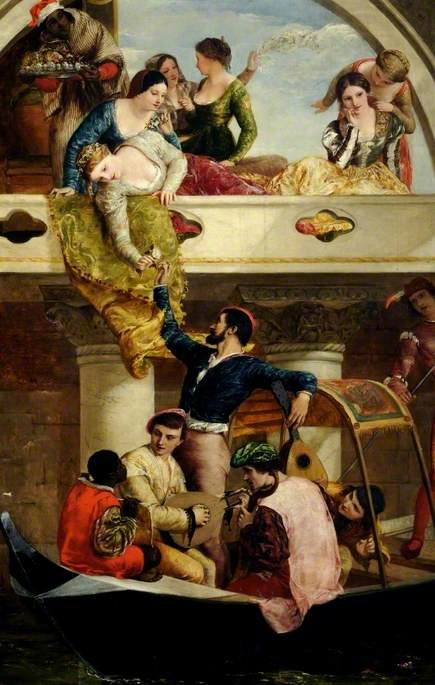
A Dream of Venice (1850)

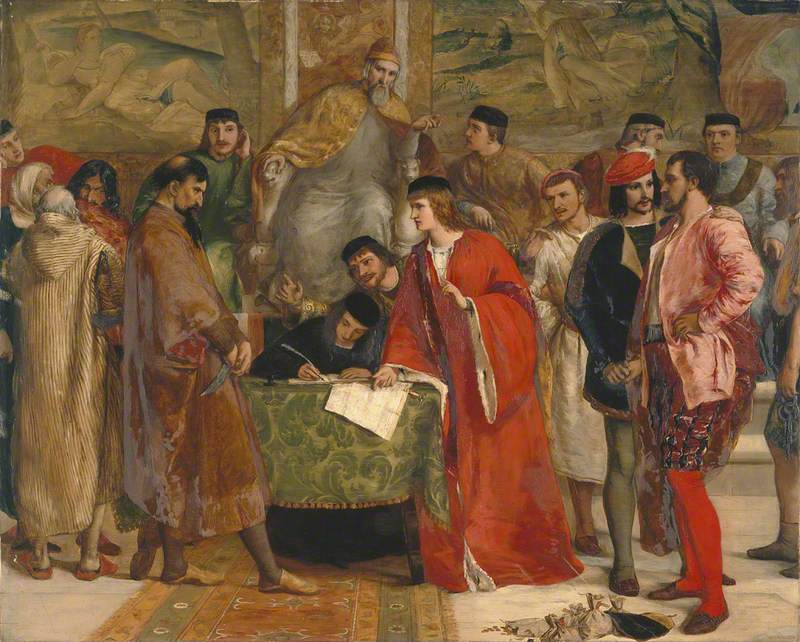
The Defeat of Shylock (1851)

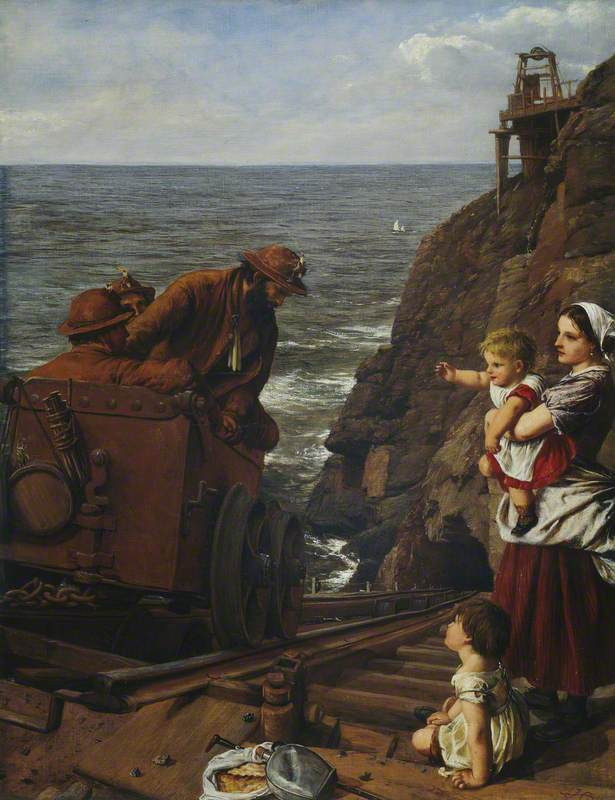
From Under the Sea (1864)

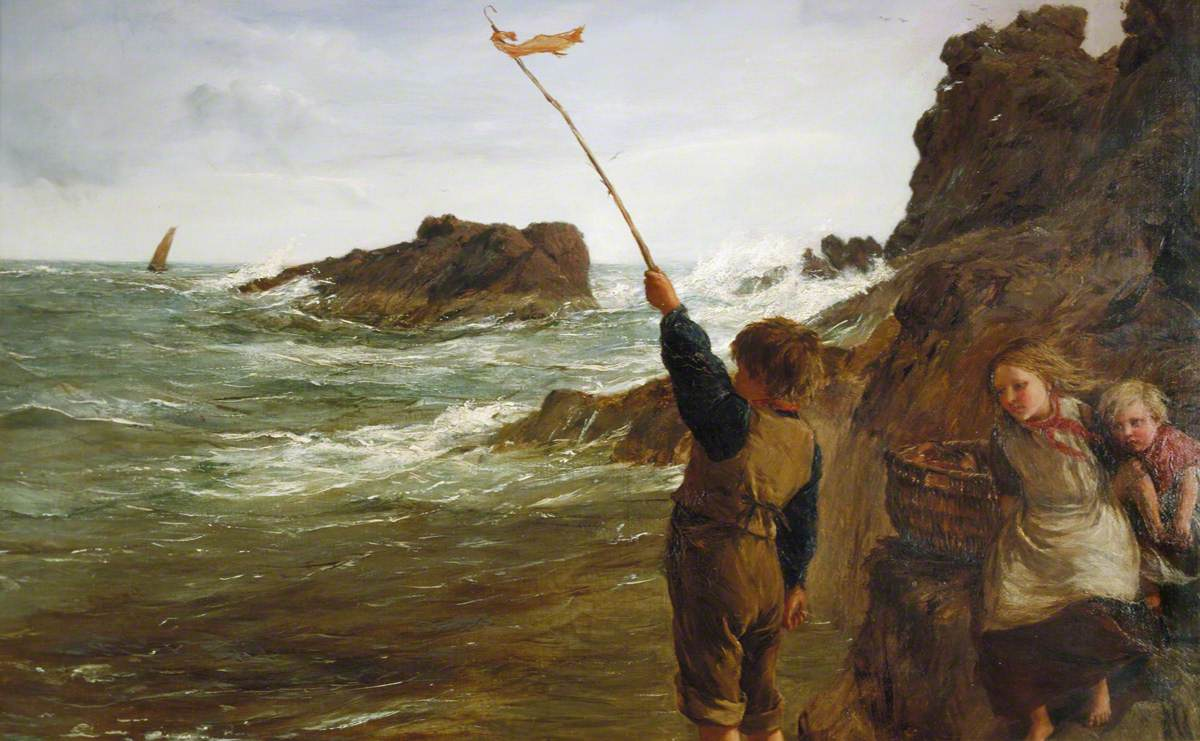
Caught by the Tide (1869)

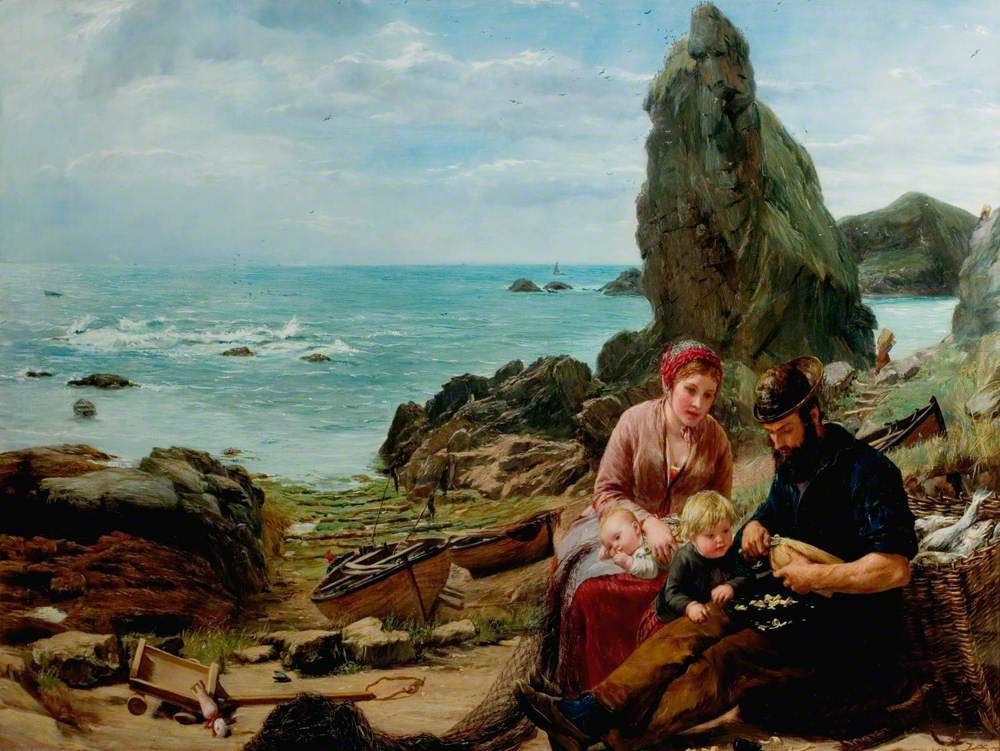
Hearts of Oak (1875)

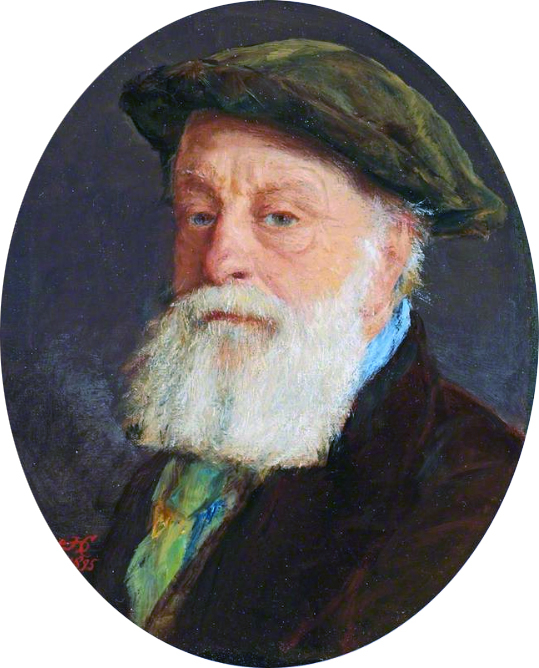
Self portrait (1885)

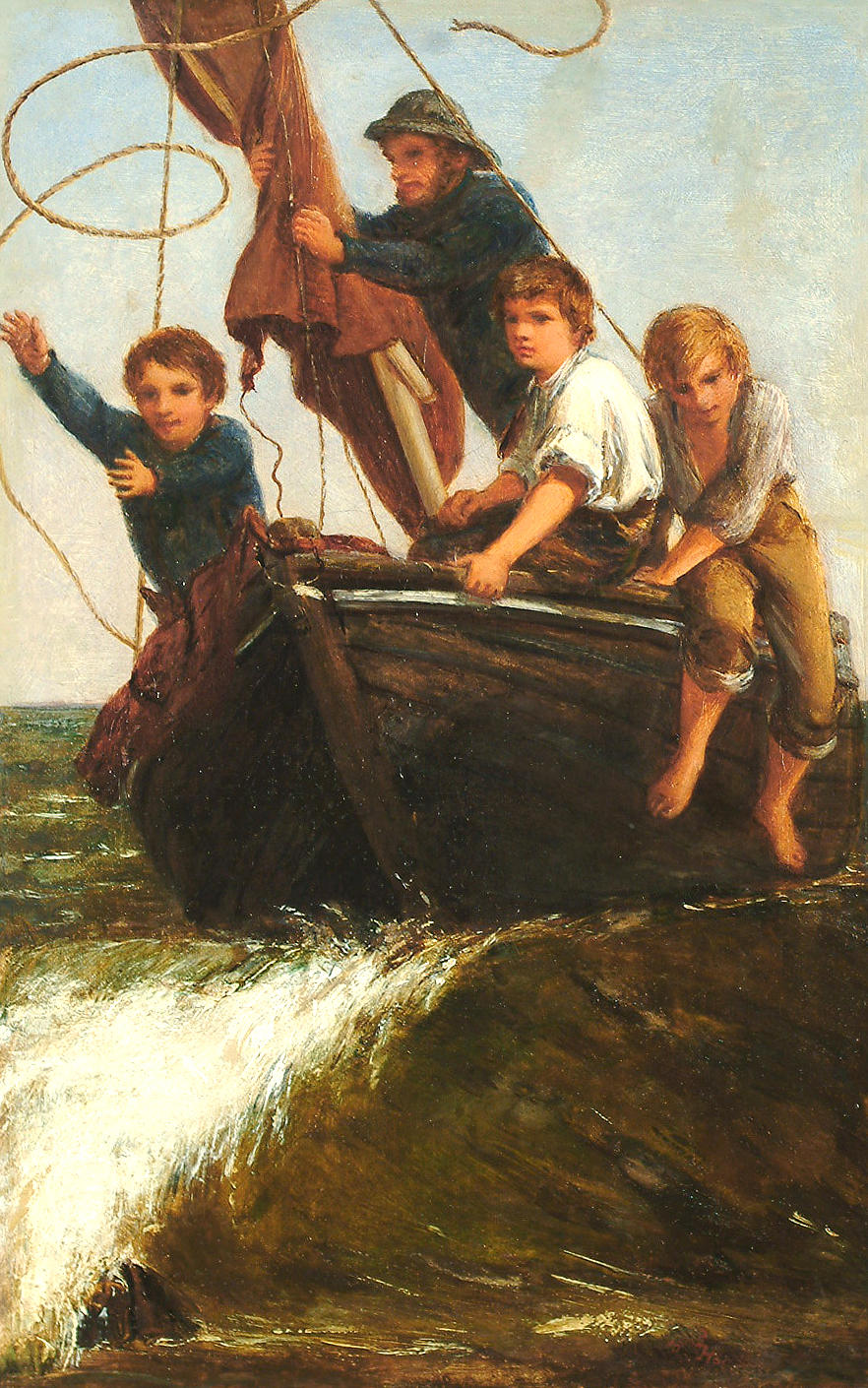
Bringing the boat ashore

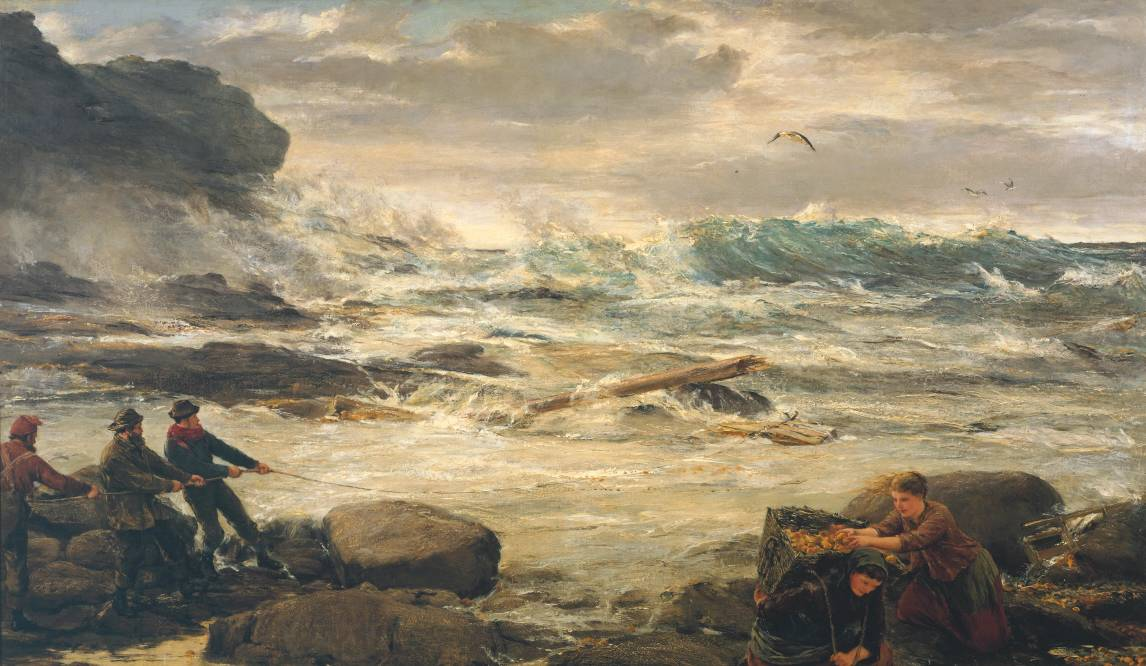
Wreckage from the Fruiter

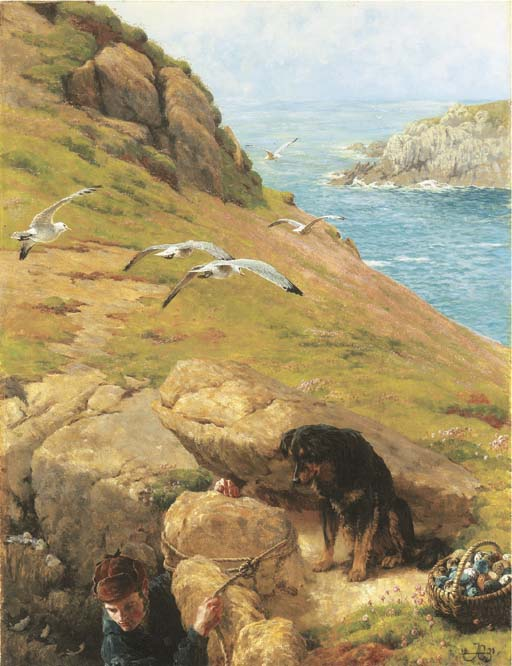
The Gull Catcher

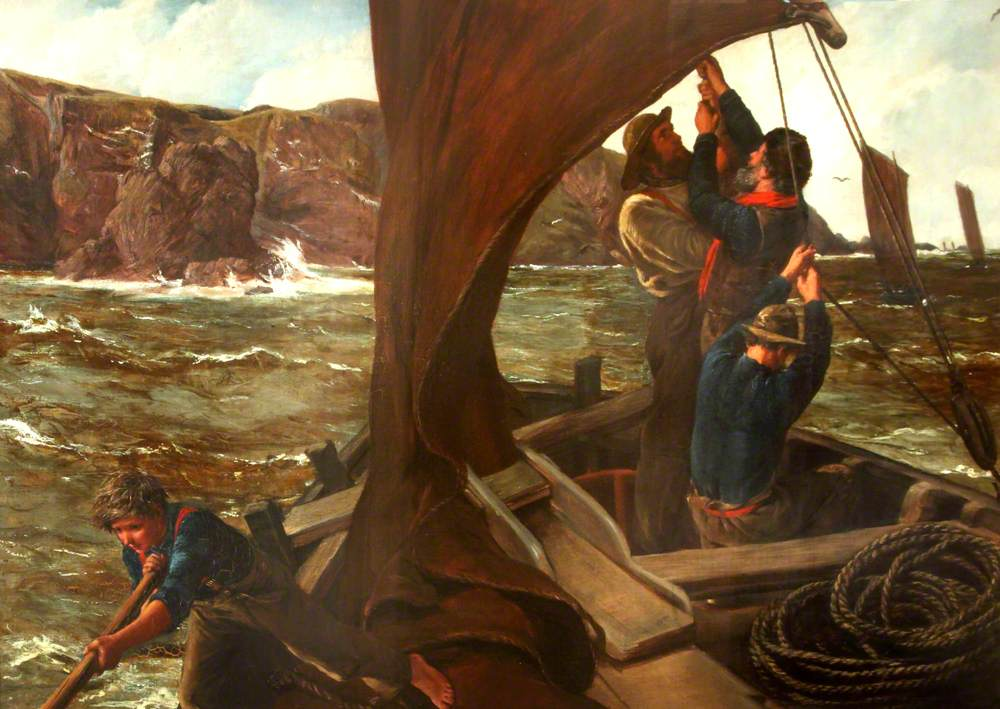
Give us this day our daily bread

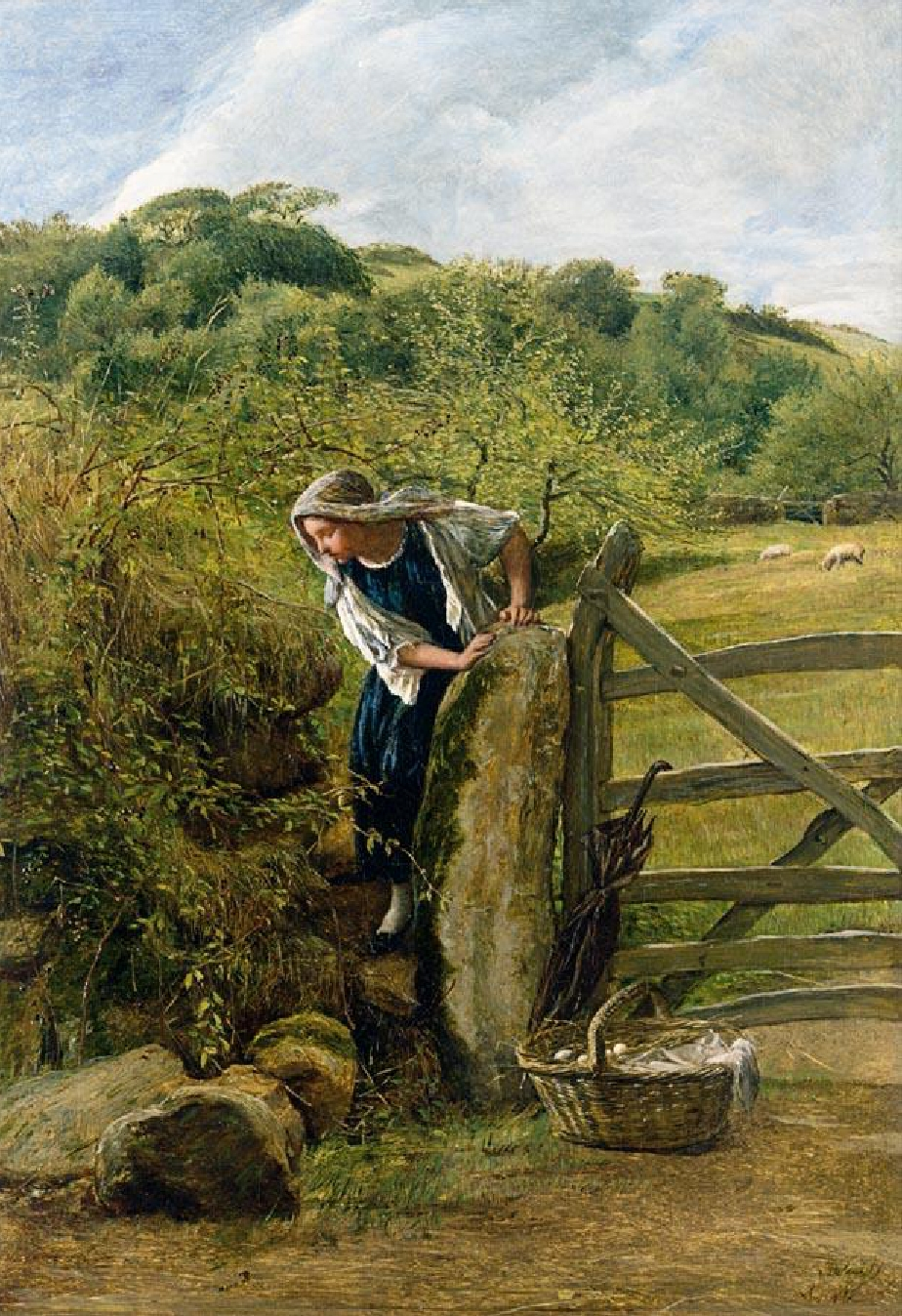
Going to market

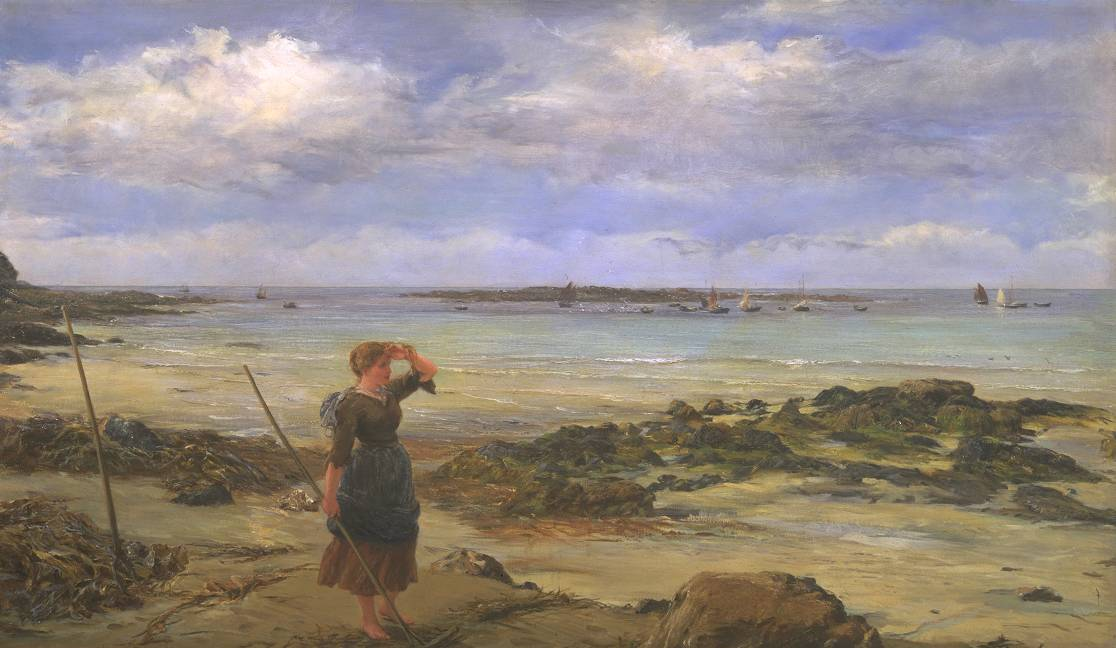
The Seaweed Raker

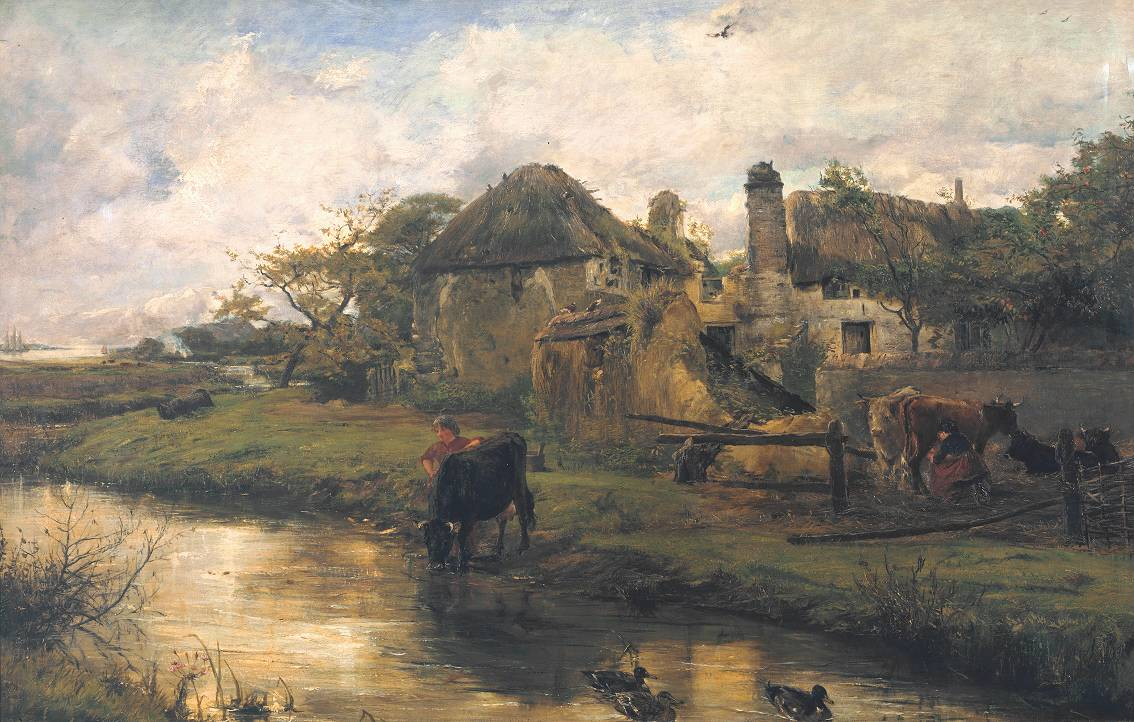
The Stream

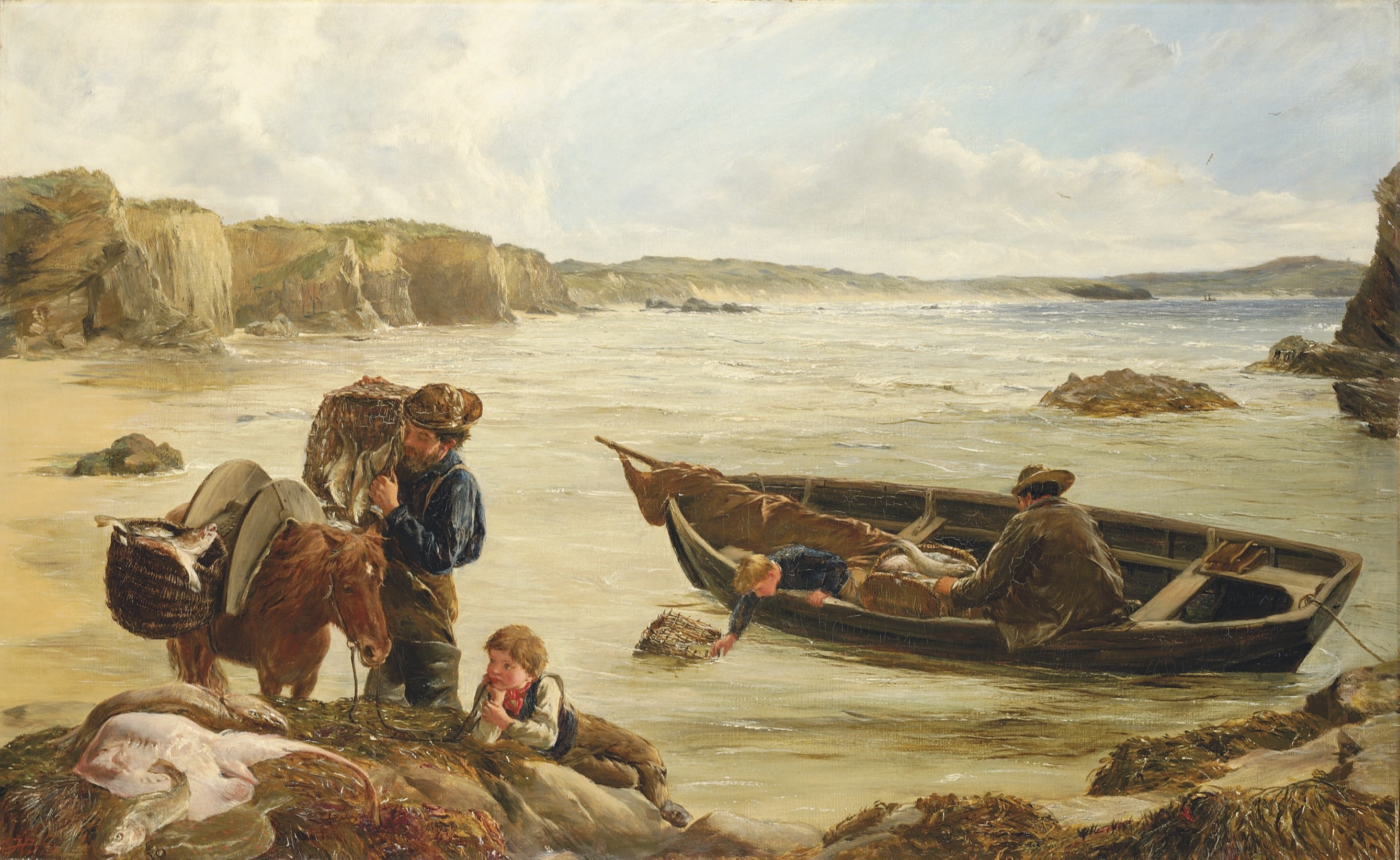
Under the lee of a rock
