= William Charles Thomas Dobson =

English painter

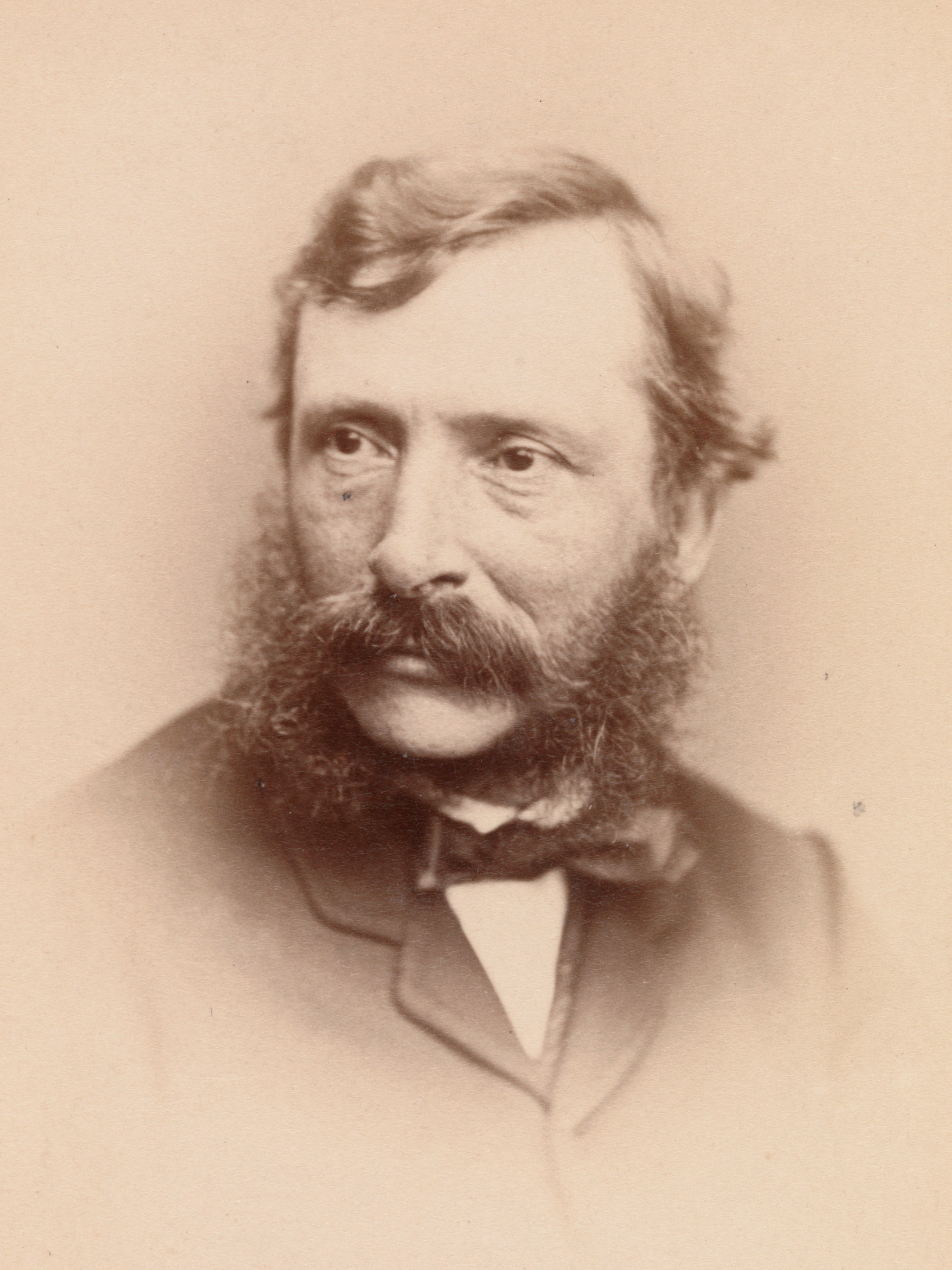
- Born: 8 December 1817; Hamburg
- Died: 30 January 1898 (aged 80); Ventnor, Isle of Wight, England, United Kingdom
- Education: Royal Academy
- Known for: Religious painting
- Movement: Nazarene school

William Charles Thomas Dobson RA RWS (8 December 1817 – 30 January 1898) was an English painter.

== Life ==
Dobson was born in Hamburg, the son of the merchant John Dobson, who had married in Germany. The family came to England in 1826, and Dobson was educated in London. He studied in the British Museum, and was taught by Edward Opie, nephew of John Opie. In 1836 he entered the Royal Academy Schools, and was instructed by Charles Lock Eastlake.

Through Eastlake's influence Dobson obtained a post in the government school of design established in the old Royal Academy rooms at Somerset House. In 1843 he became head-master of the government school of design in Birmingham, resigning in 1845, and went to Italy, where he spent most of his time at Rome. Moving on to Germany, he was impressed by the Nazarene school of that time. On returning to England he took up religious painting.

Dobson was elected an Associate of the Royal Academy on 31 January 1860, and an academician in January 1872. He was a member of the Etching Club, founded in 1842. In 1870 he was elected an associate of the Royal Watercolour Society, of which he became a full member in 1875. He remained a constant exhibitor, both at the Royal Academy and at the Royal Watercolour Society, contributing about a hundred and twenty pictures to the former and about sixty to the latter. He was appointed a British juror for the Exposition Universelle, Paris in 1878 and was represented there by 3 watercolours. He became a retired academician in 1895, and died at Ventnor on 30 January 1898.

== Work ==
Dobson exhibited portraits, and The Hermit, a subject from Thomas Parnell's poem, at the Royal Academy Exhibitions of 1842–45. The Young Italian Goatherd, painted in Italy, was at the exhibition of 1846. He painted numerous scriptural subjects, at first in oils, later in water-colours also, which caught the vogue for sentimentality, and were popularised by engraving.

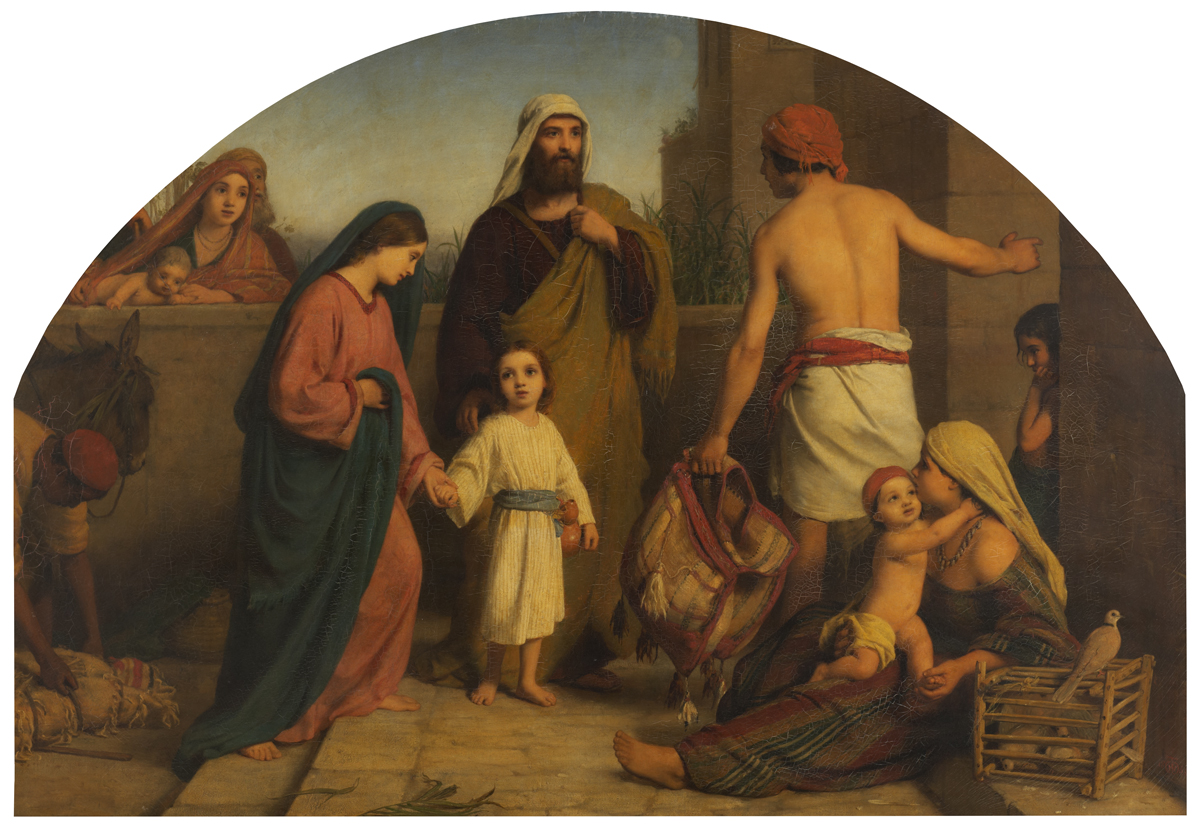
The Holy Family Returned from Egypt Dobson, 1863 painting by Dobson

Some of Dobson's religious pictures were:

- Tobias and the Angel, 1853
- The Charity of Dorcas, 1854
- The Aims-Deeds of Dorcas, 1855, which was bought by Queen Victoria
- The Prosperous Days of Job, 1856 (this and the previous work were engraved by Henry Bourne for The Art Journal)
- The Child Jesus going to Nazareth with his Parents, and Reading the Psalms, 1857, both owned by Baroness Burdett-Coutts
- The Holy Innocents
- The Good Shepherd
- Abraham and Hagar

and among secular subjects: The Picture Book (International Exhibition 1862); The Camellia, The Dresden Flower-Girl, Sappho, Mignon, and Ione.

As a watercolourist Dobson resisted innovation, by artists such as Frederick Walker, and George John Pinwell who used bodycolour.
