= Bolton Corney =

Bolton Corney (1784–1870) was an English army officer and official, known as a critic and antiquary.

== Life ==
Corney was born at Greenwich on 28 April 1784, and baptised in the parish church of St. Alphage. He obtained in 1803 a commission as ensign in the 28th Foot. Later he was at Greenwich, where he held the post of first clerk in the steward's department at the Royal Hospital. He retired in 1845 or 1846, when he married, and moved to Barnes, Surrey, where he lived to his death on 30 August 1870, surrounded by his books.

Corney was a member of the council of the Shakspere Society and the Camden Society, and an auditor of the Royal Literary Fund. He engaged in controversy with Anthony Panizzi of the British Museum.

== Works ==
Corney's works were:

- Researches and Conjectures on the Bayeux Tapestry [Greenwich, 1836], London 1838. He contended that the tapestry was not executed till 1205, and his view was adopted by John Lingard. Édouard Lambert (1794–1870) published a reply to Corney, Réfutation des objections faites contre l'antiquité de la Tapisserie de Bayeux,’ Bayeux, 1841.
- Curiosities of Literature by I. D'Israeli illustrated, Greenwich [1837], criticism of Isaac D'Israeli who replied in The Illustrator illustrated [1838], prompting Corney to bring out a second edition, with Ideas on Controversy, deduced from the practice of a Veteran; and adapted to the meanest capacity.
- On the new General Biographical Dictionary: a Specimen of Amateur Criticism, in letters to Mr. Sylvanus Urban, Lond. 1839, privately printed. Letters originally published in the Gentleman's Magazine, criticising the work of Hugh James Rose.
- Comments on the Evidence of Antonio Panizzi, Esq., before the Select Committee of the House of Commons on the British Museum, A.D. 1860; privately printed.
- The Sonnets of William Shakspere: a Critical Disquisition suggested by a recent discovery (by V. E. Philarète Chasles, relating to the inscription which precedes the sonnets in the edition of 1609) [Lond. 1862]; privately printed.
- An Argument on the assumed Birthday of Shakspere: reduced to shape, 1864; privately printed.

He edited:

- From manuscript An Essay on Landscape Gardening by Sir John Dalrymple, 4th Baronet, Greenwich, 1823;
- The Seasons by James Thomson, with illustrations designed by The Etching Club, 1842;
- Oliver Goldsmith's Poetical Works, illustrated, with a Memoir, 1846;
- The Voyage of Sir Henry Middleton to Bantam and the Maluco Islands in 1604 (for the Hakluyt Society), 1855;
- Of the Conduct of the Understanding, by John Locke, 1859.

Corney was a contributor to Notes and Queries and The Athenæum; and he made collections on William Caxton, which he provided to William Blades.

== Family ==
Around 1846 Corney married Henrietta Mary Pridham, eldest daughter of Richard Pridham R.N. of Plymouth. He left an only son, Bolton Glanvill Corney, born 1851, of the Royal College of Surgeons, who was appointed government medical officer in Fiji.
