= William Foster (historiographer) =

British historiographer and civil servant

Sir William Foster CIE
- Born: 19 November 1863
- Died: 11 May 1951 (aged 87)

Sir William Foster CIE (19 November 1863 – 11 May 1951) was a British historiographer and civil servant who was Registrar and Superintendent of Records in the India Office. He was a member of the Hakluyt Society and was "the foremost authority on the detailed history of early British relations with India and other countries in Asia."

== Biography ==
Foster was born on 19 November 1863, the son of a civil servant. He was educated in the Coopers' Company's (Grammar) School for Boys and London University. In 1882 he entered India Office and continued working there until 1927. He became Registrar and Superintendent of Records from 1907 to 1923 and Historiographer to the India Office from 1923 to 1927. He served the Hakluyt Society as Secretary (1893–1902) and President (1928–1945).

Foster was knighted in the 1925 New Year Honours.

== Works ==
A bibliography of Foster is provided by Anthony Farrington.

- The Register of Letters and of the Governor and Company of Merchants of London Trading into the East Indies 1600-1619 with Sir George Birdwood (1893)
- Letters Received By The East India Company (1897)
- The Embassy of Sir Thomas Roe to India 1615-19: As Narrated in his Journal and Correspondence 2 vols. (ed. 1899)
- The English Factories in India, 1618-1669 : a Calendar of Documents in the India Office, British Museum and Public Record Office (1911) first of thirteen volumes, eleven of which are available at: Internet Archive
- A Guide to the India Office Records, 1600-1858 (1919)
- Early Travels in India, 1583-1619 (1921)
- The East India House: its History and Associations (1924)
- John Company (1926)
- A Supplementary Calendar of Documents in the India Office Relating to India or to Home Affairs of the East India Company 1600-1640 (1928)
- Thomas Herbert: Travels in Persia 1627-1629 (ed. 1928)
- A New Account of the East Indies 2 vols. with Alexander Hamilton (1930)
- England's Quest of Eastern Trade (1933)

Also - * Winter, Edward, (signed as "W. F.") in Dictionary of National Biography, London: Smith, Elder, & Co., (1885-1900) in 63 vols.

== Bibliography ==
- Beckingham, C. F. (1951). "Sir William Foster, C.I.E." Journal of the Royal Asiatic Society. 83 (3–4): 224. doi:10.1017/S0035869X0010499X.
