= Roy Arthur Odell Bridge =

British banker

Roy Arthur Odell Bridge CMG (27 June 1911 – 14 September 1978) was a banker in charge of international currencies at the Bank of England. He spent a 40-year career at the Bank of England and was mainly in charge of managing the value of sterling during the Bretton Woods period.

== Career ==
Bridge started his career at the Bank of England at the age of 18. He was UK Alternate on managing board of European Payments Union in Paris from 1950 to 1952. He then moved to various posts at the Bank of England including adviser to the governors from 1963 to 1965 ending assistant to the governors, until the end of his career at the Bank of England in 1969. After his career at the Bank of England he became adviser to the chairman at the Mellon Bank (1970–77).

Forrest Capie, in his history of the Bank of England, qualified him as "the master of foreign exchange but also a considerable character". One of his biggest professional challenge was to avoid the 1967 devaluation of sterling, mission he eventually failed. After his death, the Bank of England organised the Roy Bridge Memorial lecture series in his honour.
