= Roy Bridges (historian) =

Roy C Bridges (1932 – 1 August 2020) was a noted historian the main focus of whose academic work was the British institutions and personnel which were established in East Africa in the middle years of the nineteenth century. He was Professor of History at the University of Aberdeen where he taught from 1964 to 1997. From 2002 to 2008 he was the President of the Hakluyt Society. He was also a Fellow of the Royal Geographical Society and the Royal Historical Society.

His PhD thesis began his course of research into the identification and analysis of the British institutions which sent expeditions to East Africa from the period roughly 1840 to 1870. The thesis was concerned with the Royal Geographical Society, but the scope of his interest was soon extended to embrace missionary societies, British government representatives and the explorers themselves.

He also sought to analyse and discuss the nature of the interaction which took place between the newly arriving British institutions and their personnel on the one hand, and the various indigenous peoples of East Africa on the other. It is this examination of the interaction and demonstration that the relationships were not as straightforward as previously assumed that may justify the claim to some academic and wider historical significance for the publications produced.

== Full list of publications ==
- 'Krapf and the Strategy of the Mission to East Africa', Makerere Journal 5 (1961) pp. 37–50 (pamphlet: 2 copies).
- 'Speke and the Royal Geographical Society', Uganda Journal 26 (1962) pp. 23–43 (1 journal; 1 offprint).
- ‘The RGS and the African Exploration Fund, 1876-1880', Geographical Journal 129 (1963) pp. 25-35 (2 copies).
- 'Explorers and East African History', Proceedings East African Academy 1 (1964) pp. 69-73 (2 copies).
- Introduction to second edition of JL Krapf, Travels, Researches and Missionary Labours [1858] London: Cass (1968) pp. 1-75. [The only substantial biography of Krapf in English.]
- 'The Sponsorship and Funding of Livingstone's Last Journey', [International Journal] African Historical Studies 1 (1968) pp. 79-104 (2 copies).
- 'A Manuscript Kinika Vocabulary and a Letter of JL Krapf, Bulletin of the Society for African Church History 2, no.4 (1968) pp. 293-8 (Bulletin plus offprint).
- Editor (with P Dukes, JD Hargreaves and W Scott), Nations and Empires. Documents on the History of Europe and its Relations with the World, London: Macmillan (1969).
- 'John Hanning Speke: Negotiating a Way to the Nile', in Africa and its Explorers ed. Robert Rotberg, Cambridge, Mass., and London: Harvard University Press (1970) pp. 95-137 (3 copies).
- Entries on 'East Africa-Exploration; East Africa- Slavery and the Slave Trade; Uganda- History; Tanzania-History; Kenya-History; Kenya-Mau Mau' in Standard Encyclopedia of Southern Africa, Cape Town (1971-5) vols IV 160-3; 169-73; VI 340-7; VII 247-50; X 409-13; XI 31-8.
- Contribution to Debate at RGS on The Nile Quest in Geographical Journal 138 (1972) pp. 223-4.
- 'The Problem of Livingstone's Last Journey', Livingstone and Africa. Edinburgh: Centre of African Studies (1973) pp. 163-77.
- 'Europeans and East Africans in the Age of Exploration', Geographical Journal 139 (1973) pp. 220-32.
- Editor, Senegambia. Aberdeen: African Studies Group (1974) 185 pp.
- 'The Centenary of David Livingstone', Kenya Historical Review 8 (1975) pp. 6-11.
- 'W.D. Cooley, the R.G.S. and African Geography in the Nineteenth Century’.
  - Part I: ‘Geography of Eastern Africa', Geographical Journal 142 (1976) pp. 27–47;
  - Part II: ‘Attitudes and Achievements', Ibid. 142 (1976) pp. 274-86 (2 copies).
- The Documentation of David Livingstone. London: Hakluyt Society (1978) [The text of a lecture delivered at the Annual General Meeting] (2 copies).
- 'The First Conference of Experts on Africa' in Experts in Africa, ed. JC Stone, Aberdeen: African Studies Group (1980) pp. 12-28
- Editor and Introduction (with JD Hargreaves) of Rose Nwoye, The Public Image of Savorgnan de Brazza, Aberdeen: African Studies Group (1981)
- 'Europe in Africa' and ‘The Source of the Nile Debate' in A Cultural Atlas of Africa, ed. J Murray, Oxford (1981) pp. 56-63
- 'James Augustus Grant 1827 - 1892 - African Explorer and Illustrator' [being the Introduction to] James Augustus Grant in Africa, London: HMSO for National Library of Scotland (1982)
- 'The Historical Role of British Explorers in East Africa', Terrae Incognitae 14 (1982) pp. 1-21 (1 journal; 2 offprints)
- Editor and Introduction, An African Miscellany for John Hargreaves, Aberdeen: African Studies Group (1983). Including:
  - 'An Aberdeenshire Family and the Indian-African Connection in the Nineteenth Century', pp. 5-10.
- 'Africa, Africans and the Sea', in Africa and the Sea, ed. JC Stone. Aberdeen: African Studies Group (1985) pp. 14-26.
- ‘The Foundation and Early Years of the Aberdeen Centre of the Royal Scottish Geographical Society', Scottish Geographical Magazine 101 (1985) pp. 77-84.
- 'The Visit of Frederick Forbes to the Somali Coast in 1833', International Journal of African Historical Studies 19 (1986) pp. 679-91.
- 'David Livingstone's Journal Entry for 26 March 1866' in J Thrower, ed., Essays In Religious Studies for Andrew Walls, Aberdeen: Dept of Religious Studies (1986) (off print).
- 'Nineteenth-Century East African Travel Records with an Appendix on "Armchair Geographers" and Cartography’, Paideuma 33 (1987) pp. 179–96.
- 'Nineteenth-Century Exploration and Mapping’ in Maps and the Mapping of Africa, ed. PM Larby, London: SCOLMA (1987) pp. 9–13.
- 'Elephants, Ivory and the History of the Ivory Trade in East Africa', in The Exploitation of Animals in Africa, ed. JC Stone, Aberdeen: African Studies Group (1988) pp. 193–220
- 'Britain and the Boers, 1899-1902', in Romance of the Three Empires, 1830s to 1980s. Tokyo (1989) pp. 113–124 [in Japanese]. Also in Asahi Magazine 30 (1988) pp. 64–68 (Typescript of English and Japanese offprint).
- 'Official Perceptions during the Colonial Period of Problems facing Pastoral Societies in Kenya', in Pastoral Economies in Africa and Long-Term Responses to Drought, ed. JC Stone, Aberdeen: African Studies Group (1991) pp. 141–53.
- 'Africa from the 18th Century', being Chapters 37-41 of The Times Atlas of World Exploration, ed. Felipe Fernandez-Armesto, London: HarperCollins (1991) pp. 186–209 and 35 short biographies pp. 246–72.
- Contribution to four articles in Times Atlas of World History, 4th ed. London (1993) pp. 134–5; 162–3; 234–5; 236–7.
- 'Alexander Mackay' in Dictionary of Scottish Church History, ed. NM de S Cameron. Edinburgh: Clark (1993) p. 518.
- 'James Augustus Grant's Visual Record of East Africa', Hakluyt Society, Annual Report (1994) pp. 12–24.
- 'Maps of East Africa in the Nineteenth Century', in Maps and Africa, ed JC Stone, Aberdeen: African Studies Group (1994) pp. 12–13.
- History Bibliography: South Africa 1910-1984. Curriculum Support Series: CSYS History, Scottish Consultative Council on the Curriculum (1996)>
- Editor (with PEH Hair) Compassing the Vaste Globe of the Earth. Studies in the History of the Hakluyt Society, 1846-1996, London: Hakluyt Society (1996) xi +336 pp. Including also articles on:
  - 'William Desborough Cooley and the Foundation of the Hakluyt Society', pp. 50–78. (with PEH Hair)
  - ‘The Hakluyt Society and World History', pp. 225-39.
- 'Livingstone, David', in Encyclopedia of Africa South of the Sahara, ed. John Middleton, 4 vols, New York (1997) III pp. 55-7.
- 'Exploration in The Oxford Companion to British History, ed., John Cannon, Oxford: OUP (1997) pp. 361-2 and biographical entries on 33 explorers and travellers.
- 'Foreword' [on Thomas Callander and the Callander Lectures] in John MacKenzie, Empires of Nature and the Nature of Empires. Imperialism, Scotland and the Environment, East Linton: Tuckwell (1997) pp. vii-x.
- John D Hargreaves. An Academic Memoir and Bibliography. Aberdeen: Department of History, University of Aberdeen (1997) iv + 28 pp.
- 'Explorers' Texts and the Problem of Reactions by Non-Literate Peoples', Studies in Travel Writing 2 (1998) pp. 65-84.
- Editor, Imperialism, Decolonization and Africa. Studies Presented to John Hargreaves, Basingstoke: Macmillan (1999). xv + 213 pp. Including articles:
  - 'Towards the Prelude to the Partition of East Africa', pp. 65-113
  - 'John Hargreaves - an Academic Memoir'
  - 'A Bibliography of the Writings of John Hargreaves', pp. 181-205.
- People and Places in Newmachar Past and Present, Newmachar: Newmachar Community Council (2001) xvi + 224 pp.
- 'Exploration and Travel outside Europe (1720-1914)', in The Cambridge Companion to Travel Writing, ed Peter Hulme and Tim Youngs, Cambridge: CUP (2002) pp. 53-69.
- (with Elizabeth Trueland) Annotated Bibliography for South Africa 1910-1984, Dundee: Learning and Teaching Scotland, (2002) iv + 35 pp.
- Contributor to Literature of Travel and Exploration An Encyclopedia, ed. Jennifer Speake, 3 vols., New York and London: Fitzroy Dearborn [Taylor and Francis] (2003). Including articles on:
  - 'James Bruce' pp.130-132; ‘William Burchell’ pp. 141–143;
  - 'Hugh Clapperton' pp. 254–256;
  - 'Dixon Denham' pp. 328–330;
  - 'East Africa' pp. 355–360;
  - ‘Hakluyt Society' pp. 537-539;
  - 'Richard and John Lander' pp. 690-692;
  - 'Sir Roderick Murchison', 826-828;
  - ‘White Nile' pp. 1279-1281. Annotated bibliographies are on the website at www.routledge-ny.com/travellit/azentries
- Biographies of WD Cooley; JA Grant; JH Speke; T. Parke in (New) Oxford Dictionary of National Biography (2004).
- Articles on 'Africa: British Interests to 1895'; 'Henry Morton Stanley' in Readers' Guide to British History, ed. David Loades, London: Routledge & Taylor and Francis. (2003?).
- 'African History at Makerere in the 1960s: a Further Perspective' (with Merrick Posnansky), History in Africa 31 (2004) pp. 479-482.
- Contributor to Encyclopedia of African History, ed Kevin Shillington, 3 vols., London: Taylor and Francis, 2005. Including articles on:
  - 'Europe: Explorers, Adventurers and Traders’ pp. 516–518;
  - 'Zanzibar: Britain, Zanzibar, Germany and the Scramble for East Africa' pp. 713–14.
- Contributor to The Oxford Companion to World Exploration, ed. David Buisseret, 2 vols., New York and Oxford (2007). Articles on:
  - Africa: Exploration [8000 words] I, 8-20;
  - Africa: Geographical Barriers to Exploration I, 20–21;
  - Africa: Indigenous Porters and Guides I, 21–23;
  - Africa: Patrons, Sponsors and Supporters I, 24–26;
  - African Association I, 28;
  - Bruce, James I, 127–8;
  - Brussels Geographical Conference 1,128-130;
  - Burchell, William I, 135;
  - Cameron, Verney Lovett I, 150–1;
  - Challenger Expedition I, 178–80;
  - Denham, Dixon I, 234;
  - East African Lakes I, 251–2;
  - Expeditions, World Exploration: England I, 277–9;
  - Galton, Francis I, 339–41;
  - Grant, James Augustus I, 354;
  - Hakluyt Society I, 367–8;
  - Imperialism and Exploration I, 405–7;
  - Johnston, Keith I, 426–7;
  - Krapf, Ludwig I, 441;
  - Lander, Richard and John Lander I, 447–8;
  - Livingstone, David I, 474–6;
  - Mackinder, Halford II, 2–3;
  - Markham, Clements II, 17;
  - Nile River II, 71–3; Rebmann, Johannes II, 190–1;
  - Royal Geographical Society II, 205–7;
  - Royal Scottish Geographical Society II, 207;
  - Speke, John Hanning II, 269–70;
  - TeleIci, von Szek, Samuel, and Ludwig von Hohnel II, 291;
  - Thomson, Joseph II, 301–2;
  - Tuckey, James H. II, 313–4;
  - Zanzibar II, 372–3.
- 'Images of Exploration in Africa: the Art of James Augustus Grant on the Nile Expedition of 1860-1863', Terrae Incognitae 38 (2006) pp. 69–88.
- 'A Dangerous and Toilsome Journey. Jacob Wainwrights Diary of the Transportation of Dr Livingstone’s Body to the Coast, 4 May 1873 – 18 February 1874: Translated and edited by Roy Bridges, in Four Travel Journals, London: The Hakluyt Society, 3rd series, 18 (2006) [2007].
- 'The Christian Vision and Secular Imperialism: Missionaries, Geography and the Approach to East Africa, c. 1844-1890', in Converting Colonialism. Visions and Realities in Mission History, 1706-1914 ed. Dana L Robert, Grand Rapids Michigan and Cambridge, UK: William B Eerdmans (2008) pp. 43–59.
- Contributor to Oxford Companion to English Literature 7th Edition ed. Dinah Birch (2009). New and/or revised entries on: Baker; Barth; Burckhardt; Burton; Cameron; Galton; Hakluyt; Hakluyt Society; Harriot; Livingstone; Marco Polo; Purchas; Royal Geographical Society; Speke.
- Dictionary of African Biography, Oxford University Press, New York. Articles on Dallington Maftaa (?1859-188?) and Jacob Wainwright (?1856-1892) [submitted May 2010].
- ‘The Early Years of the Second World War at New Machar School’, Newmachar (2010)
- ‘The Legacy of Richard Hakluyt: Reflections on the History of the Hakluyt Society’, in Richard Hakluyt and Travel Writing in Early Modern Europe ed. D Carey and C Jowitt, London: Hakluyt Society Extra Series 47 (2012) pp. 309–317.
- Editor and Introduction, A Walk Across Africa. J.A. Grant’s Account of the Nile Expedition of 1860-1863, London: Hakluyt Society, Series III vol 32 (2018).
- The Phoney War of September 1939 to October 1940 and its Aftermath: Memories of the Second World War Period c. 1937 -1945/6 with Related Recollections, Newmachar (2020).
