= Frederick Tavaré =

English landscape painter (1810–1868)

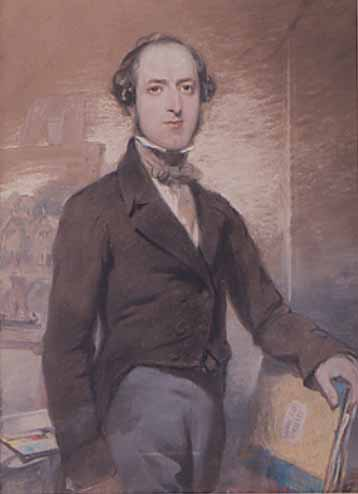
- Portrait by Robert Crozier, 1850
- Born: c. September 1810; Pendleton, Greater Manchester, England
- Died: 17 June 1868; Prestwich, Greater Manchester, England
- Resting place: St Luke's Church, Cheetham, Manchester
- Children: 8, including Frederick
- Relatives: Charles Swain (cousin)

Frederick Tavaré (1810 – 17 June 1868) was an English landscape painter who specialised in watercolours.

He was the father of F. L. Tavaré, also an artist, and a cousin of the poet Charles Swain.

== Early life ==
Frederick Lawrence Tavaré was born in 1810 in Manchester, England, to Charles Tavaré and Catherine Owens; his birth date is unknown but he was baptised in September.

Tavaré's father, Charles Tavaré, was born into a family with French ancestry in Amsterdam's Sephardic Jewish community in 1771; he anglicised his name from Nünes de Tavarez to Tavaré when he emigrated to the United Kingdom in 1791. A student of the University of Göttingen, he found success co-founding and operating a series of dye and bleach works. He also established his own chapbook publisher, did literary translation as a hobby—he could read and write twelve languages, and speak nine—and taught languages at the Manchester Mechanics' Institute.

Tavaré's aunt, Caroline, was the mother of poet Charles Swain, making Swain and Frederick Tavaré first cousins. Swain's father died when he was six, and Charles took in his sister and nephew, raising the boy as if he was his own son and later employing him as a bookkeeper. He had an immense influence on Swain, who dedicated an 1827 book of poems to him.

The influence of his father and cousin meant Frederick Tavaré grew up surrounded by creative figures. Charles Swain's engraving business was near to The Sun Inn on Long Mill Gate, which was the city's main meeting house for industrialising Manchester's nascent community of artists, writers, and other intellectuals (including both Swain and Tavaré). It was renamed Poets' Corner in the mid-19th century to honour its most famous clientele, the Sun Inn Group (also known as "The Manchester Poets"), a group of working class poets which included figures such as John Critchley Prince, Samuel Bamford, Isabella and George Linnaeus Banks, Ben Brierley, and John Bolton Rogerson. Henry Liverseege and his family—including Henry's brother-in-law, Alfred Gomersal Vickers—were also neighbours and close friends of the Tavarés during Frederick's childhood.

== Career ==
In 1826, Tavaré became the apprentice of Charles Swain's close friend Michael Pease Calvert—the indenture stated that for five years Tavaré would "be taught and instructed in the art, trade, and mystery of a Landscape Painter and Drawing Master".

Manchester's artists began to band together into clubs and societies in the late 1820s as the city's early art markets and cultural institutions—such as the Royal Manchester Institution—failed to provide them with reliable financial support. Tavaré was a founding member of the Manchester Artists' Drawing Society in 1829—along with Arthur Perigal, Charles Calvert, James Parry, and George Evans—and the Manchester Artists in 1830.

When life drawing classes were eliminated by the Manchester School of Design shortly after its foundation in 1838, Tavaré was one of a group of local artists—which included Robert Crozier, Thomas Letherbrow, and Warwick Brookes—who founded the United Society of Manchester Artists in protest. The society held its own life drawing classes in a studio above a china shop on King Street until 1849, when classes were restored by James Astbury Hammersley, the School's president.

Tavaré was the head of a committee of artists established in 1844 to solicit funds to support the widow of Joseph Maiden, and he proposed forming another society—"The Artists of Manchester"—during a meeting of members of the School of Design in 1849. He was also one of the founding members of the Manchester Academy of Fine Arts in 1859.

Tavaré was employed as an art teacher at a number of different schools throughout his career, including Chorlton Hall School (in Chorlton-on-Medlock), Irwell Lodge (in what is now Drinkwater Park) and Newton House (in Longsight).

== Personal life and death ==
Tavaré married Ann Ward on 10 July 1844. They had seven sons and one daughter, though two sons died within their first year. Their two oldest surviving sons were also artists; F. L. Tavaré followed in his father's footsteps by becoming a professional landscape painter, while Charles Edward Tavaré became an art teacher. Both comedian Jim Tavaré and England international cricketer Chris Tavaré are descendants of their fifth son, Alfred Nunes Tavaré.

Tavaré died on 17 June 1868 at the age of 58, and was buried at St. Luke's Church in Cheetham alongside his parents.
