= Charles Swain (poet) =

English poet and engraver

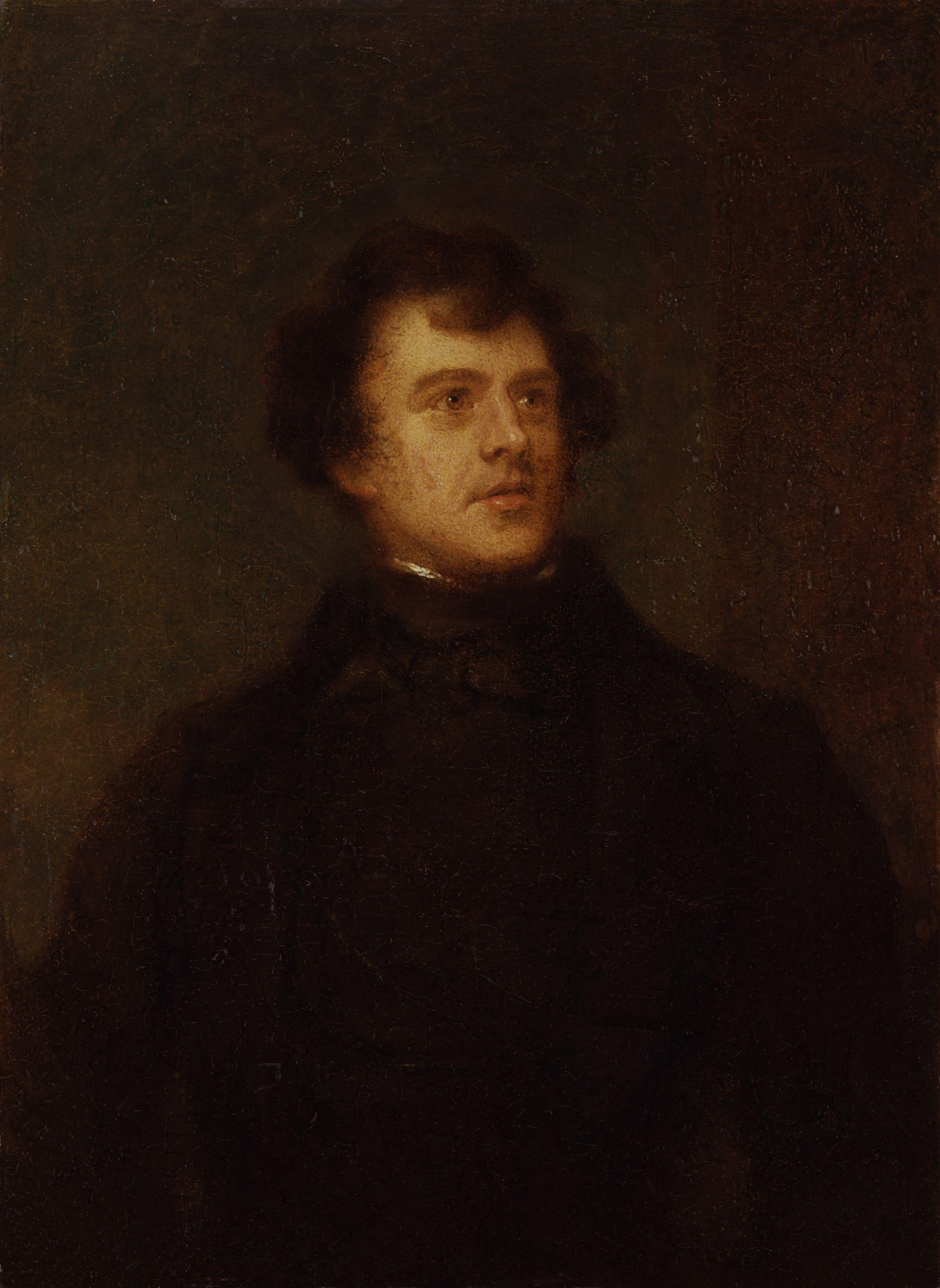
- Charles Swain, circa 1833 by William Bradley
- Born: 4 January 1801; Manchester, England
- Died: 22 September 1874 (aged 73)
- Spouse: Ann Glover (m. 1827; died 1874)
- Children: 6

Charles Swain (4 January 1801 – 22 September 1874) was an English poet and engraver, born in Manchester. He was honorary professor of poetry at the Manchester Royal Institution, and in 1856 was granted a civil list pension. His friends included Robert Southey. Swain's epitaph for John Horsefield is noted by English Heritage as an element of their rationale for listing Horsefield's tomb as a Grade II monument.

Charles Swain was born to an English father and French mother in Every Street, Manchester, England, on 4 January 1801, (Note: Various early sources, including Swain himself, state that he was born in 1803 but this is contradicted by later studies.) He received an education and began work when aged 15 as a clerk for Tavaré and Horrocks, a dye-works that was part-owned by a maternal uncle. He married Ann Glover in January 1827 and the couple went on to have five daughters and a son, of which four daughters lived to become adults.

Swain left his job at the dye-works after fourteen years to become a bookseller. That venture did not last and two years later he joined Lockett & Co., a firm of engravers and lithographers in Manchester. He had artistic interests – as indicated by his memoir of Henry Liverseege, the Mancunian artist, and books such as A Cabinet of Poetry and Romance: Female Portraits from the Writings of Byron and Scott (1845) – and he went on to buy the engraving department from the firm and to run it himself.

By the time the bookselling venture ended, Swain was already friends with Robert Southey and with other literary names. His poems had been published in journals from 1822 onwards and he had also had various more substantial works published, such as Metrical Essays on Subjects of History and Imagination (1827), Beauties of the Mind: a Poetical Sketch with Lays Historical and Romantic (1831) and The Mind (1832).

Around 1840 he became part of a working class poetry collective known as the Sun Inn Group, which met at a pub on Long Millgate in Manchester. Other notable members included Samuel Bamford, John Critchley Prince, John Bolton Rogerson, Robert Rose, Elijah Ridings, and Isabella Banks. Swain contributed to their only published anthology, The Festive Wreath (1842), before the Group disbanded in 1843.

Swain died on 22 September 1874 as the result of an epileptic seizure. He had been living at Prestwich Park, Prestwich, at the time, in a house bought for him by friends. His wife died four years later.

== Famous work ==
- Metrical essays on subjects of history and imagination (1827)
- Beauties of the mind: A poetical sketch; with Lays historical and romantic (1831)
- Dryburgh Abbey, the burial place of Sir Walter Scott: A vision (1832)
- Memoir of Henry Liverseege (1835)
- Cabinet of poetry and romance (1844)
- Rhymes for childhood (1846)
- Dramatic chapters: poems and songs (1847)
- English melodies (1849)
- Letters of Laura d'Auverne (1853)
- Poems (1857)
- Art and Fashion: with other sketches, songs, and poems (1863)
- Songs and ballads (1867)
- Dryburgh Abbey and other poems (1868)
- Selections (1906) (posthumous)
