= The Sun Inn Group =

Poetry group

The Sun Inn Group was a group of poets (also known as the Manchester Poets and the Bards of Cottonopolis) associated with Manchester, England in the mid-19th century. Taking their name from the public house where they met between 1840 and 1843, they also established the short-lived Lancashire Literary Association in 1841.

Originally a small group of working class writers who were all friends of John Critchley Prince, it eventually grew to have around 50 members at its height—including Samuel Bamford, John Bolton Rogerson, Isabella Banks, Charles Swain, and Robert Rose—whose works ranged widely in subject, form, and style.

== History ==
=== The Sun Inn ===
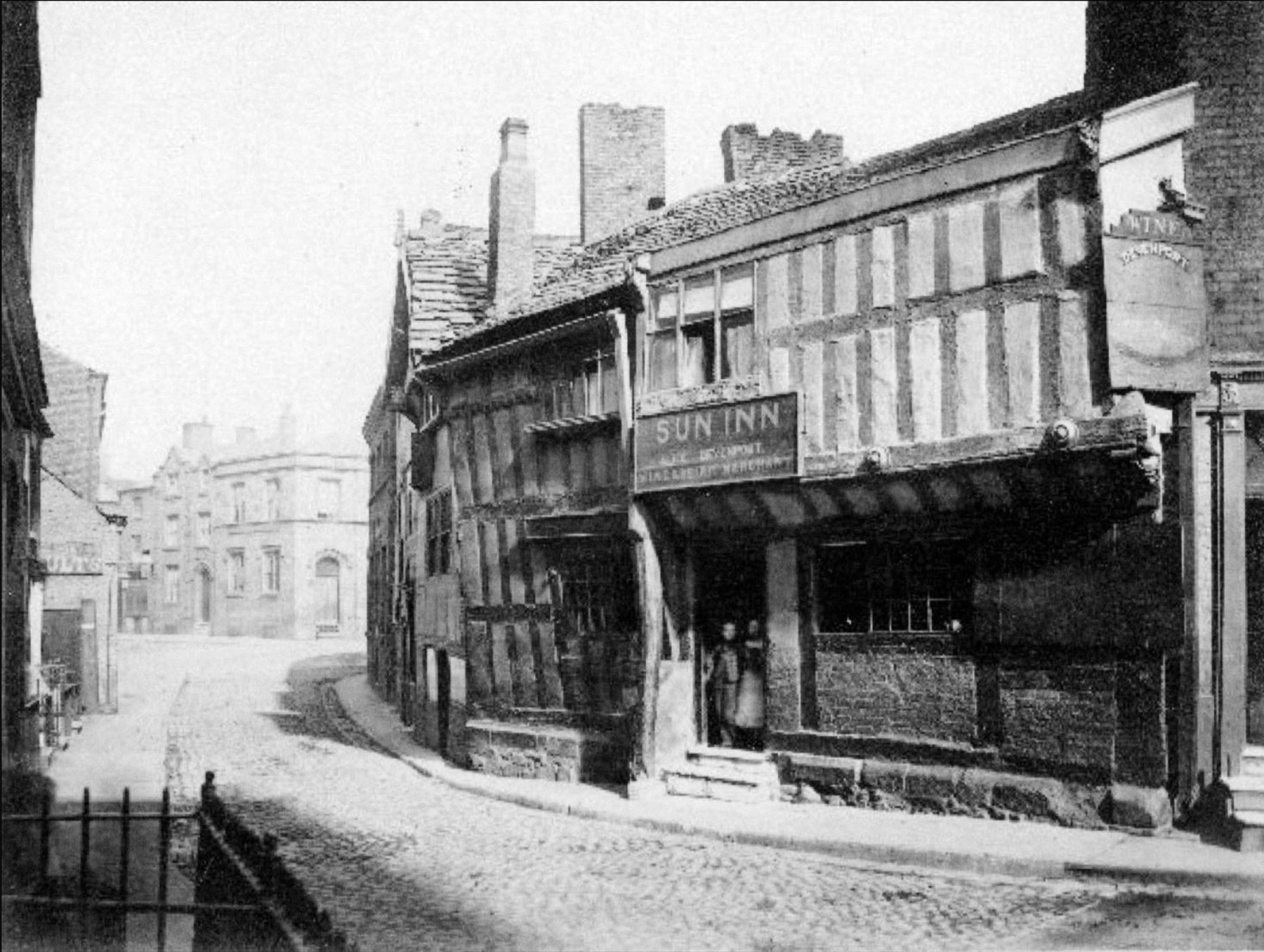
The Sun Inn on Long Millgate in 1866. Viewed looking towards the junction with Todd Street, with the entrance to Chetham's Library behind the photographer's position.

The Sun Inn was a small timber-and-plaster pub on Long Millgate, located opposite what is now Chetham's School of Music and Chetham's Library. By the 19th century it was one of the oldest surviving buildings in Manchester, though its true age was unknown:

So far back as its history can be traced, it has always been an inn or alehouse, and it has long borne the sign of the Sun. It consists of two stories, and its roof is in part supported by an old tree stem. Its small door is approached by two steps upward, and there is only one long squat window on the ground floor, closed at night by an outer shutter. The upper story overhangs; over the lower window a sign displays the Sun, blazing away in full glory.

Local legend held that when the wooden Collegiate Church was deconstructed and replaced with a stone building in 1421 (forming the earliest parts of what is now Manchester Cathedral) the old timbers were reused for nearby buildings, including the Sun Inn. An inscription of "1612" on a wall was understood as referring to the year alterations were made to the original building. Inside the Inn were a number of small rooms connected by "awkward and ill-planned passages," but there was one "commodious apartment" which made the Inn capable of hosting larger meetings and events.

It eventually lost its license in the early-1870s and was converted into "Ye Olde Curiosity Shop" by a new owner, M. J. Davis, an antiquarian. Its condition steadily worsened over the following decades but it remained an antique store until at least 1914, when the roof collapsed during a storm. The former Inn and its neighbours—in the area bounded by Long Millgate, Todd Street, Corporation Street, and Fennel Street—were some of the few remaining pre-Victorian buildings in central Manchester at the time they were demolished in the 1920s. This area is now the northern part of Cathedral Gardens.

=== Origins of the Sun Inn Group ===
Manchester had been a market town, and a centre of the textile trade in Lancashire, for centuries, and by the early 19th century its intense and rapid urbanisation due to the Industrial Revolution was well underway—however, its cultural development was much slower. This began to change for fine art with the establishment of the Royal Manchester Institution in 1823, but in literature and poetry the city was still considered a "wasteland" into the 1830s. There was a common perception that persisted well into the later years of the 19th century, both within and outside of Manchester, that the people of the city were too preoccupied with industry and commerce to produce quality art. Manchester Poetry, published in 1838, was the first anthology of poetry that had actually been written in the city—in his introduction, editor James Wheeler wrote that it was intended for the "majority" of people, who, upon seeing a book of "Manchester poetry", would instinctively "laugh at the editor" because "this town cannot produce any good save only such as emanates from the spindle or the power-loom." Manchester was nevertheless still a significant centre for the publishing trade, though most of what the city's many publishers produced was viewed as lower-quality in both content and form (such as chapbooks), with a largely working class readership.

While Manchester was considered by many to be culturally undeveloped in the early-19th century, it was infamous for its class politics—particularly after the Peterloo massacre of 1819, which galvanised many in the city (and the wider country) towards unionisation, and campaigning for better democratic representation and labour rights. By the 1830s the city had developed a small but passionate community of working class authors, journalists, and poets, but "the real cultural life of [their] city was still class-based, and part of a social world a working man could never enter." For example, Charles Swain was invited to sit on stage as a representative of the city's literary community when Charles Dickens spoke at the Manchester Athenaeum Club in 1843, but he was also pointedly not invited to the club's banquet afterwards—his modest background meant he was never accepted as a true cultural elite despite his reputation as "Manchester's Tennyson."

In response to these social barriers, Manchester's working class intellectuals organised into informal societies where they could discuss literature, philosophy, and other subjects. They met in whichever spaces were available—shops, each other's homes, and pubs—and the Sun Inn was especially popular by the late-1830s, where readings and debates often took place alongside other typical pub activities like cards, darts, gambling, and music.

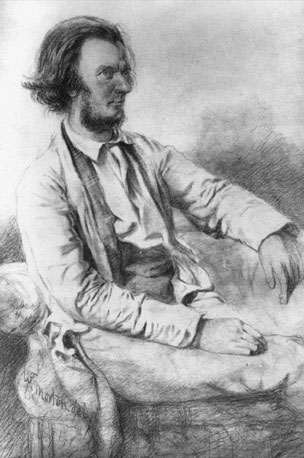
John Critchley Prince

The formation of the Sun Inn Group in particular is credited to John Critchley Prince. Originally from Wigan, Prince had apprenticed under his father as a reed-maker for thatched roofs before marrying at 19 and settling in Hyde, but he had wanted to become a poet ever since being introduced to the works of Lord Byron at the age of 13. He and some of his other working class friends formed an informal society called "the Literary Twelve," which held meetings at their homes in Hyde, Ashton-under-Lyne, Dukinfield, and Stalybridge. In 1840, having been writing verse for several years without attracting the attention of publishers, he left his factory job in Hyde to move with his family to the building opposite the Sun Inn on Long Millgate, where he opened a book and stationery shop on the ground floor. This business was never successful but, as he had hoped, it gave him connections in Manchester's literary world—including Joshua Westhead, his first patron.

Prince—an alcoholic like his father—spent most of his free time in the parlour of the Sun Inn, where he quickly became a popular figure among the existing clientele. A tight-knit group of a dozen or so friends formed with Prince at its centre, around which the more loosely associated Sun Inn Group coalesced, with as many as 50 members at its height (though it never had any kind of formal membership process or list). The most important of Prince's personal friends was John Bolton Rogerson—while Prince was the Group's key social figure he had little interest in actively being its leader, leaving Rogerson to organise and chair meetings.

The Group was largely made up of working class, self-taught writers who had to hold down other jobs to support their literary ambitions—for example, Samuel Bamford was a weaver, Charles Swain was a lithographer, Elijah Ridings was a bell-ringer, and Richard Wright Procter was a barber. Some had been established as poets for some time, whereas other were relative newcomers. The West Indian poet Robert Rose (self-dubbed "the Bard of Colour") was part of the Group, as was Isabella Varley, who met and married George Linnaeus Banks in 1846 after being introduced while both worked on Oddfellow's Magazine, edited by Rogerson (who invited many other members of the Group to contribute in the 1840s, marking the first time several had ever been paid to write). Though poetry was the unifying concern of the Group, many non-poets were members—most notably George Falkner, editor of George Bradshaw's Bradshaw's Journal, the only literary journal which regularly accepted and published Manchester's working class poets.

Their output varied widely in style, tone, and even language, with some members writing verse in their own distinctive Lancashire dialect—a literary choice which faced considerable prejudice from the middle- and upper-class cultural establishment of the time. While their poems often explored the negative aspects of working class life in a Victorian British city—including issues like poverty, homelessness, inequality, prostitution, and alcoholism—their interests also ranged well beyond the "doom and gloom of factory life, poor conditions, and lack of education," representing a "vibrant and artistic working class culture" concerned with everything from theology to satire. Many were active Chartists —with Peterloo veterans Bamford and Ridings particularly influential on younger members—though others were avowedly apolitical (including Prince).

Meetings were loud and boisterous, including the singing of verse, and though the Group had several female members proceedings were usually dominated by men; Isabella Varley was so intimidated that she used to hide behind a velvet curtain at the back of the room during proceedings, and was afraid to read her own work aloud.

=== Lancashire Literary Association & The Festive Wreath ===
Prince's first major work, Hours With the Muses, was published in July 1841, and he "awoke to find himself famous." It was a critical success—attracting extra attention in part because of the novelty of his working-class background—and the Sun Inn earned the nickname "Poet's Corner," with working class writers flocking there from across Lancashire.

That same month—on 28 July—Prince, Rogerson, and the other core members held a meeting at the Sun Inn to announce that the Lancashire Literary Association had been formed "for the purpose of advancing their common interests." The Association was intended to be a formal organisation, meeting regularly, which would launch its own monthly literary journal to promote the Sun Inn Group's works to a wider audience beyond Lancashire, and which more generally would "protect and encourage British authors." However, they continued to maintain an irregular schedule of meetings, and had failed to move forward with their plans for a new journal by the end of the year.

At around this time the Sun Inn's landlord, William Earnshaw, recognised the business opportunity presented by the pub's notoriety as a literary venue and officially embraced the name "Poet's Corner," carving it into the lintel above the entrance and commissioning a new sign for the outside wall. He also proactively pushed for the Association to hold more meetings—most notably inviting them to hold a large "poetical soiree" (a banquet and poetry recital) on 7 January 1842, which was seen as a success.

This led to a follow-up "poetic festival" on 24 March, the largest meeting that the Sun Inn Group ever held, with more than 40 people in attendance. It was a raucous event, opening with a number of speeches and songs, as well as a toast to George Falkner for continuing to publish their poetry in Bradshaw's Journal. It was chaired by Rogerson, vice-chaired by Rose, and was covered in detail by The Manchester Guardian.

The songs and poems presented at the March 1842 festival were gathered together into a single volume by Rogerson, which was published in July 1842 as The Festive Wreath: A Collection of Original Contributions Read at a Literary Meeting, Held in Manchester, March 24th, 1842, at the Sun Inn, Long Millgate. It was published by Bradshaw & Blacklock, Falkner's publisher for Bradshaw's Journal. In his introductory essay for the collection, Rogerson explained that the name of the anthology was chosen because the Group wanted something they could "present to the public" as a representation of their collective efforts. He also noted that one of the buildings near the Sun Inn was the birthplace of poet William Harrison Ainsworth, positioning the Sun Inn and its patrons as successors to one of the few nationally successful writers to have emerged from Manchester in that era.

=== Dissolution ===
The publication of The Festive Wreath did not—as the Group had hoped—mark the emergence of a major new regional school of poetry. It was neither the first in a series of anthologies or the precursor to the launch of a literary journal, and instead was the Group's sole publishing venture as a unified collective.

The Lancashire Literary Association only lasted around 18 months, as within a year of the publication of The Festive Wreath Prince had moved to Blackburn, Rogerson had moved to Harpruhey to become a cemetery registrar, and Earnshaw moved on to run the Cemetery Inn in Collyhurst—and without those three key organisational figures the Association (and the Sun Inn Group more widely) quickly lost momentum. The pub continued to be referred to as "The Sun Inn" after its renaming by Earnshaw, and the earliest known photograph of the building, taken in 1866, shows that the official name had reverted again from Poet's Corner at some point after his departure (though both names were used colloquially for years afterwards).

Many of the Group's members remained close friends over the following decades—including working for each other and publishing each other's work—but they did so instead as a group of interconnected individuals within Manchester's wider literary community. Several members even turned away from poetry altogether, focusing instead on other literary forms (such as fiction or journalism).

== Influence and legacy ==
Of the societies of working class poets which emerged in the industrialising cities of England in the mid-19th century, the Sun Inn Group was the most prolific, with the biggest national profile. However, assessments of its impact are mixed. In his memoir, Group member Richard Wright Procter describes the Lancashire Literary Association as "a somewhat ambitious scheme that fell still-born from the mind of its projector," which, in retrospect, was always doomed to fail. It is also unlikely that there was enough of a market for poetry (and literature in general) in Lancashire at the time to have made a regular journal viable, even if it had been launched.

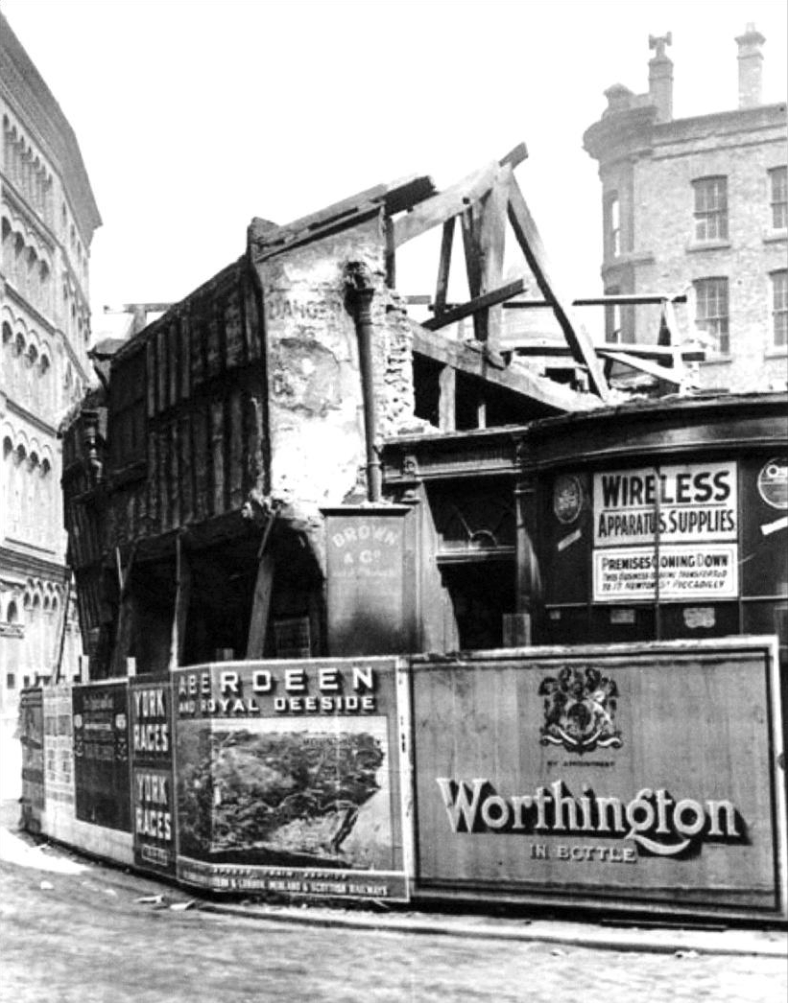
Demolition of the former Sun Inn in 1923.

The Sun Inn Group did have a short-term influence on other poets and writers in Manchester in the immediate aftermath of its emergence—for example, Ann Hawkshaw wrote the introduction to her first published collection the day after reading The Manchester Guardian's report on the March 1842 festival, and positioned herself as part of the city's new "poetic momentum." The Lancashire dialect writers accepted and promoted by the Group were also an influence on later poets like Benjamin Brierley, Edwin Waugh, and Fanny Forrester. However, the Group's longer-term "memory" lasted only a few decades according to William Arthur Shaw, who wrote in 1894 that it was "fading fast," though he added that as long as the former Inn building itself survived "there will still abide with us an evidence and an influence of a provincial—let us say it—a Manchester poetry, very true, if not very abundant in power, and provincial, it may be, only by name and accident." Historian Thomas Swindells retroactively coined "the Bards of Cottonopolis" as a name for the Group in 1906, and argued that the Sun Inn should have been recognised as an important local literary landmark and not allowed to fall into disrepair.

In a 2017 retrospective for P. N. Review, Michael Powell wrote that "few of the poems produced for [The Festive Wreath] have aged well," with the Group's most celebrated members now mainly remembered for literature other than their poetry—most notably Isabella Banks for The Manchester Man, and Samuel Bamford for Passages in the Life of a Radical. However, he also noted that the Sun Inn represented a precursor to the role of British pubs in the late-20th century as "a vital space for poetry, a place where young poets can come together, to get on a stage, perform, and read their work to a sympathetic audience of fellow writers."

Other historians view the Sun Inn Group's longer-term impact as more significant. Martha Vinicus places the Group within the context of a nationwide breaking down of the perception (among both critics and the general public) that regional and dialect literature lacked any cultural or historical merit, such that by the 1870s "even those with an upper-class accent were anxious to claim their local culture." As Manchester's first notable artistic community centred around the written word, the many members of the Group and the connections they formed with each other—even if not the Group itself per se—are credited as having had an important influence on how the city's literary culture continued to develop through the rest of the 19th century.

The explosion of working class writers in 1840s Manchester also eroded the city's reputation as culturally undeveloped, such that it had arguably become the second-most-important literary city in the United Kingdom by the end of the 19th century after London. Publishers like George Falkner and Abel Heywood continued to promote the works of local poets and other writers in their magazines and journals in the years and decades afterwards, "dispelling the notion that [Manchester] had no native literary culture beyond its dialect writers," while the city became just as respected for the quality of its publishing output as its quantity.

The Lancashire Literary Association in particular is also seen as a precursor to the literary societies founded in the years that followed—such as the Manchester Literary Club, in 1861—which gave their working class members access to social networks and intellectual resources which had previously been the preserve of the "rigid and conservative" cultural elites in organisations like the Manchester Athenaeum Club and the Manchester Literary and Philosophical Society.

In 2016 Chetham's Library hosted an exhibition, "Poet's Corner", which featured works by the Sun Inn Group, as well as archive materials related to their "artistic milieu."

== Members ==
While The Sun Inn Group never had a formal membership list, Alexander Wilson's contribution to The Festive Wreath—"The Poet's Corner"—mentions 34 different people, and can be taken as reasonably comprehensive. It reveals an organisation whose membership was made up of both amateur and professional poets, as well as a number of non-poets and patrons.

"The Poet's Corner" was a drinking song intended as a comic interlude in the middle of an otherwise serious evening, and some of the people referenced are difficult to identify due to lacking full names or being only alluded to via cryptic in-jokes. The names (in the order they appear in the song) are:

- Samuel Bamford ("the Radical gas-light, whose flame will shed lustre on ages unborn")
- Elijah Ridings ("the Bellman" who "hath courted the muse")
- "Three of the Will's-Sons" (Alexander Wilson himself and his brothers Samuel and Thomas, both amateur songwriters)
- John Bolton Rogerson ("Chairman")
- George Richardson (known for his poem "Patriot's Appeal")
- John Dickinson ("who binds books for us all")
- William Earnshaw (landlord of the Sun Inn, "the schoolmaster" and "our host")
- John Mills (nicknamed "Moses Mills," "an elf, who sings, plays, and writes all by himself")
- Robert Rose ("from whose prose even poetry flows")
- John Ball (a teacher from Seacombe, "learned and poetical")
- James Boyle ("cork-cutter")
- William Harper (author of Genius and other Poems (1840))
- John Rawsthorne ("a repealer in corn," leader of a delegation to Parliament from the Anti-Corn Law League)
- J. T. Brandwood Halstead ("lawyer")
- Richard Wright Procter
- "Mr. Horsfield" and "Mr. Parry" ("engravers")
- John Critchely Prince
- Charles Swain
- "Mr. P. D. Scully"
- Benjamin Stott
- William Gaspey (known for Poor Law Melodies and other Poems (1842))
- John Scholes (known for The Bridal of Naworth and Miscellaneous Poems (1837))
- Robert Story
- William Taylor (known for poems including "The Maiden of the Snow" and "The Dreaming Girl")
- George Falkner ("who bags us diurnal in Bradshaw's famed Journal, the flights of our wing, and the warblings of song")
- Thomas Arkell Tidmarsh ("he's sighing, for Mary he's dying," referring to his alleged poetic obsession with the name "Mary")
- "Mr. Grimshaw" ("spinner, Barrowford")
- John Howard ("whose name for philanthropy passes")
- James Lord ("who despises the follies of France")
- John Hill ("worthy as that of Parnassus, who fosters the genius of art and romance")
- William Eamer ("we've pipes and we've porter, we've brandy and water")

"The Poet's Corner" was amended on the day of the festival to only reference those who had been able to attend, which is why none of Isabella Banks, Eliza Craven Green, Isabella Caulton, or Eliza Battye are mentioned—although copies of their poems were sent to be read in their absence, and were all subsequently included in The Festive Wreath. The footnotes beneath "The Poet's Corner" which appear in The Festive Wreath, explaining many of the oblique references, were originally provided to Rogerson by Banks.

There are several additional Sun Inn Group members known from other sources:

- John Kershaw was on the governing committee for the Lancashire Literary Association.
- John Dent delivered a reading to the poetic festival on 24 March 1842, but was not included in The Festive Wreath.
- In his first memoir (published 1860), Richard Wright Procter mentions that a number of actors—all members of the same Transatlantic touring troupe and "friends to the poetic literature of Lancashire"—were regular attendees of the Sun Inn: "Munyard, Bass, and Lysander S. Thompson," and Samuel William Butler. He also includes Charles Kenworthy in a list of Sun Inn poets to have died in the years since the Group disbanded.
- In his second memoir (published 1880), Procter provides biographies of two more Sun Inn Group poets—Tom Nicholson and "Sylvan" (the pen name of a member who allegedly maintained his anonymity for decades afterwards due to an intense fear of critical rejection).
- Charles Swain's cousin, artist Frederick Tavaré, attended a number of meetings at the Sun Inn, and his son F. L. Tavaré painted the Inn in 1874.
