= Robert Rose (poet) =

English poet (1806–1849)

Robert Rose (1806-1849), who styled himself the Bard of Colour, was a mixed-race poet from the West Indies active in early Victorian Manchester.

== Life ==
Rose was born in the West Indies in 1806 or 1808, and is believed to have migrated to Salford as a child. Though himself a gentleman of independent means, he was associated with a group of working class poets known as the Sun Inn Group, who met regularly at the Sun Inn on Long Millgate, Manchester. This group included John Critchley Prince, Charles Swain, John Bolton Rogerson, Elijah Ridings, and Samuel Bamford.

Rose was said to have been the first to buy a copy of Philip James Bailey's 1839 poem Festus, which had been slow to leave the shelves of Wilmot Henry Jones, 'the 'Manchester Moxon, the provincial poets printer'. The Chartist bookbinder Benjamin Stott included a sonnet to Rose in his Songs for the millions, and other poems (1843). The Kilmarnock poet John Ramsay dedicated his 1844 collection Woodnotes of a Wanderer to Rose.

Most of Rose's verse was published in newspapers, though two poems, The Coronation (1838) and The Bazaar (1839) were published separately.

Rose died in police custody on 19 June 1849, imprisoned after a drinking spree. He was 43 years old. He was buried in Manchester General Cemetery on 21 June 1849. His fellow poet John Bolton Rogerson, who was the cemetery's registrar, read a specially composed service over the grave. Lines of Rose's own verse were inscribed on his gravestone:

I’d rather have my tomb bedew’d at eve,
With the lone orphan’s or the good man’s tear,
Who softly stole at twilight here to grieve,
And sobb’d aloud — THE FRIEND OF MAN RESTS HERE!
I’d rather have this quiet humble fame
Than hollow echo of an empty name.

Charles Kenworthy wrote a poem mourning Rose's death.

A manuscript of Rose's poetry is held at Chetham's Library.

In February 2024 Rose was the subject of a BBC Radio 4 documentary by the poet and beatboxer Testament.

== Works ==
- The coronation : a poem. With reflections on the occasion. Dedicated to Her Most Gracious Majesty Queen Victoria. London: Longman and Company. 1838.
- The bazaar, a poem : embracing thoughts on the progression of knowledge in connection with it. Manchester: Printed by T. and J Belshaw, Market-Place. 1839.
- 'Sonnet – The Poets' and 'Fame, Freedom and Friendship'. In Rogerson, John Bolton, ed. (1842). The Festive Wreath; a Collection of Original Contributions Read at a Literary Meeting, Held in Manchester, March 24th, 1842, at the Sun Inn, Long Millgate. Manchester: Bradley and Blacklock. pp. 27, 57.
- The Festival of Fancy, a Poem on the Grand Fancy Dress Ball. Manchester: Printed and published by George & Alexander Falkner. 1845.
- "The Children of the Golden Lyre". The Odd Fellows' Quarterly Magazine. 8: 92. 1845.
- 'Moonlight'. In Procter, Richard Wright, ed. (1855). Gems of thought and flowers of fancy. London: Partridge and Oakey. p. 412.
