= The Manchester Man =

The Manchester Man may refer to:

- The Manchester Man (novel), an 1876 British novel by Isabella Banks
- The Manchester Man (film), a 1920 British film adaptation
