= Richard Wright Procter =

British writer (1816–1881)

Richard Wright Procter (1816–1881) was an English barber, poet, and writer.

== Life ==
The son of Thomas Procter, he was born of poor parents in Paradise Vale, Salford, Lancashire, on 19 December 1816. Apprenticed to a barber, in due course he set up in business for himself in Long Millgate, Manchester, where he also ran a circulating library. He remained there for the rest of his life.

Procter died at 133 Long Millgate, Manchester, on 11 September 1881, and was buried at St. Luke's, Cheetham. He had married, in 1840, Eliza Waddington, who predeceased him, and left five sons.

== Works ==
From around 1840 he became part of a collective of working class poets known as the Sun Inn Group, whose members included Samuel Bamford, John Critchley Prince, John Bolton Rogerson, and Robert Rose. The Group held meetings held at the Sun Inn on Long Millgate in Manchester—which became known as "Poet's Corner" as a result—and he contributed to the Group's only published anthology, The Festive Wreath (1842).

He had pieces published in City Muse (1853), edited by William Reid of Manchester. His other published works include:

- Gems of Thought and Flowers of Fancy, 1855; a volume of poetical selections, of which the first and last pieces are by himself.
- The Barber's Shop, with illustrations by William Morton, 1856; sketches of the odd characters he met. A second edition incorporated lore relating to hairdressing and to notable barbers, published, with a memoir by William Edward Armytage Axon, 1883.
- Literary Reminiscences and Gleaning with Illustrations, 1860; mainly on Lancashire poets.
- Our Turf, our Stage, and our Ring, 1862; historical sketches of racing and sporting life in Manchester.
- Manchester in Holiday Dress, 1866; on theatres and other amusements in Manchester before 1810.
- Memorials of Manchester Streets, 1874.
- Memorials of Bygone Manchester, with Glimpses of the Environs, 1880.

== Notes ==
Attribution

This article incorporates text from a publication now in the public domain: Lee, Sidney, ed. (1896). "Procter, Richard Wright". Dictionary of National Biography. Vol. 46. London: Smith, Elder & Co.
