= Joshua Brookes (divine) =

- Born: Cheadle Hulme, Cheshire, England
- Occupation: Divine
- Known for: Eccentricity

Joshua Brookes (1754–1821) was an Anglican divine and English eccentric.

== Early life ==
Brookes was born at Cheadle Hulme, near Stockport, Cheshire, and baptised on 19 May 1754. His father, a shoemaker, who removed soon after his son's birth to Manchester, was a cripple of violent temper, known by the name of Pontius Pilate. He had, however, a genuine affection for his boy, who was educated at the Manchester Grammar School, where he attracted the notice of the Rev. Thomas Aynscough, M.A., who obtained the aid which, with a school exhibition, enabled him to proceed to Brasenose College, Oxford, where he graduated B.A. on 17 June 1778 and M.A. on 21 June 1781.

== Religious career and personality ==
In the following year he became curate of Chorlton Chapel, and in December 1790 was appointed chaplain of the collegiate church of Manchester, a position which he retained until his death on 11 November 1821. He acted for a time as assistant master at the grammar school, but was exceedingly unpopular with the boys, who at times ejected him from the schoolroom, struggling and shrieking out at the loudest pitch of an unmelodious voice his uncomplimentary opinions of them as "blockheads". He was an excellent scholar, and one of his pupils, Dr. Joseph Allen, bishop of Ely, acknowledged, "If it had not been for Joshua Brookes, I should never have been a fellow of Trinity" - which proved the stepping-stone to the episcopal bench.

Brookes was a book collector; but although he brought together a large library, he was entirely deficient in the finer instincts of the bibliomaniac, and nothing could be more tasteless than his fashion of illustrating his books with tawdry and worthless engravings. His memory was prodigious. In his common talk he spoke the broad dialect of the county, and his uncouthness brought him frequently into disputes with the townspeople. He would interrupt the service of the church to administer a rebuke or to box the ears of some unruly boy. A caricature appeared in which he is represented as reading the burial service at a grave and saying, "And I heard a voice from heaven saying - knock that black imp off the wall !". The artist was prosecuted and fined. Brookes's peculiarities brought him into frequent conflict with his fellow-clergymen.

As chaplain of the Manchester collegiate church he baptised, married, and buried more persons than any clergyman in the kingdom. He is described in Parkinson's Old Church Clock as the "Rev. Joseph Rivers", and he appears under his own name in The Manchester Man by Isabella Banks. In 'Blackwood's Magazine' for March 1821 appeared a "Brief Sketch of the Rev. Josiah Streamlet", and that Brookes read it is evident from his annotated copy, which is now in the Manchester Free Library. The article was incorrectly attributed to Mr. James Crossley, but was in fact by Charles Wheeler.

In appearance he was diminutive and corpulent; he had bushy, meeting brows (Parr styled him "the gentleman with the straw-coloured eyebrows"), a shrill voice, and rapid utterance. He was careless and shabby in his dress, except on Sundays, when he was scrupulously clean and neat. His portrait, from a drawing taken by Minasi a few weeks before his death, has been engraved. His general appearance gained him the nickname of the "Knave of Clubs", though he was usually styled "St. Crispin". Accounts of his character portray him as unconventional, quick-tempered, amiably eccentric and rather abrupt. His friend Joseph Aston wrote a tribute to him in the Manchester Exchange Herald which mentioned his undeviating love of truth and spirit of forgiveness, though "deficient in some of those qualities which are too often the apologies for the absence of more substantial virtues".

== Miscellanea ==
Joshua Brookes is portrayed in Mrs Linnaeus Banks's novel The Manchester Man. He is commemorated in the name of a modern public house the Joshua Brooks in Princess Street, Manchester.
