= F. L. Tavaré =

English landscape painter and antiquarian (1846-1930)

Frederick Lawrence Tavaré
- Born: December 13, 1846; Cheetham, Manchester, England
- Died: January 1930 (aged 83); Pendleton, Lancashire, England
- Resting place: St Luke's Church, Cheetham, Manchester
- Father: Frederick Tavaré
- Relatives: Charles Swain (first cousin once removed)

Frederick Lawrence Tavaré (13 December 1846 – January 1930) was an English landscape painter and antiquarian.

He typically signed his work as F. L. Tavaré, Frederick L. Tavaré, or Fred Tavaré to distinguish himself from his father, Frederick Tavaré, who was also an artist. He was born deaf.

== Early life ==
Frederick Lawrence Tavaré was born on 13 December 1846 in Cheetham Hill, to Frederick and Ann Tavaré. His father was a watercolour landscape painter and professor of art; though he was never a successful artist outside of Victorian Manchester, he was nonetheless a relatively significant and well-connected figure within the city's artistic community—including being a founding member of the Manchester Academy of Fine Arts in 1859.

The Tavaré family produced a number of intellectual and artistic figures during this era, most notably the poet Charles Swain. Frederick's third son, Charles Edward Tavaré, also became a painter and art teacher.

Tavaré was his parents' second son, but the first to survive to adulthood. He was recorded as "deaf & dumb" in the census of 1851, and educated at the Manchester Institution for the Deaf and Dumb until 1861, when he left to focus on studying art.

== Career ==
=== Artist ===
Like his father, Tavaré's preferred medium was watercolours, though he also occasionally painted in oils too. He described himself as "a follower of" John Ralston, a contemporary of his grandfather who captured many of Manchester's medieval and early modern buildings before they were demolished and replaced during the city's industrialisation. Many of Tavaré's watercolours similarly capture buildings in Manchester which were considered prominent or noteworthy at the time of their demolition—such as The Sun Inn, also known as Poets' Corner, a pub which was an important meeting place for the city's artists and writers.

Tavaré's work was first exhibited at the Royal Manchester Institution in 1867, and his work was shown there repeatedly over the following years. Like many artists of the time he also earned money as an art teacher, and from 1873 he and his brother Charles advertised their services as "Professors of Drawing" in Hyde.

Though Tavaré was still describing his occupation as a landscape painter as late as the 1911 census, he seems to have entered semi-retirement by the end of the 19th century due to financial troubles. He was forced to move into a workhouse in 1898; he had moved to Mere and was working as a postman by 1899, but he was back in the workhouse again in 1905. His final known painting (dated 1920) was of Cheetwood Priory, the former home of his uncle Charles Swain, which had been demolished in the 1910s to make way for an expanding brickworks; the site is now occupied by part of Strangeways Prison.

=== Antiquarian ===
Tavaré was a frequent contributor to antiquarian journals and newspapers on a range of esoteric historical subjects, such as public houses in Stockport, the life of customs officers in 17th century Northumberland, the age of a stables in Marple, and monumental brasses in churches around Cheshire. Some of his research either focused on the history of the Tavarés or was derived from the family's personal records—for example, a letter to Notes and Queries in December 1889 detailed how industrial-scale "turkey-red dyeing" was introduced to England by a small group of French immigrant entrepreneurs that included his grandfather, Charles Tavaré. His family's position within Manchester's artistic community also meant that he was aware of relatively obscure biographical information, such as Henry Liverseege taking on work as an inn sign painter while struggling to sell more "prestigious" works. He illustrated some of these contributions with his own woodcuts.

In 1884 Tavaré boarded for a time at Stocks House, a large mansion in Cheetham Hill which had been the residence of author and antiquarian James Crossley, founder and president of the Chetham Society (among a number of other influential positions in Victorian Britain's intelligentsia). After Crossley's death in 1883, Stocks House continued to act as a meeting house for intellectual and cultural figures from both Lancashire and the wider country.

== Personal life ==
On 2 August 1879 Tavaré was convicted of assaulting his mother, Ann, and sentenced to three months of hard labour in Belle Vue Gaol. An 1886 business register records Tavaré's professional address as his mother's home address, though whether this reflects an actual reconciliation is unknown; there are no other records indicating that they were living together again after his release from prison.

In the 1911 census his marital status is listed as "widower", but there are no records of him ever being married and he was listed as "single" up to and including the 1901 census.

He died in January 1930 in Pendleton, at the age of 83, and was interred on 8 March alongside his parents and grandparents at St Luke's Church in Cheetham.
