= John Critchley Prince =

John Critchley Prince (1808–1866) was an English labouring-class poet. His Hours of the Muses went through six editions.

== Life ==
Born at Wigan, Lancashire, on 21 June 1808, Prince was the son of a poor reed-maker for weavers. He learned to read and write at a Baptist Sunday school, and at age 9 of age was set to help his father, with whom he worked for ten years, living in Wigan, Manchester and Hyde, Cheshire.

Towards the end of 1826 or beginning of 1827, Prince married Ann Orme (baptised 1808, died 1858) of Hyde, near Manchester, when they were both just 18. By 1830 they had two daughters and a son. In 1830 he went to Saint-Quentin in Picardy to look for work, but the revolution of July 1830 disrupted his plans, and after two months he made his way via Paris to Mülhausen, where again he was disappointed. He returned on foot to Calais, Dover and Manchester, where he found his wife and children in the Wigan poorhouse.

In 1840 Prince brought out Hours with the Muses, with the help of a prominent patron. It attracted attention partly because he was a factory operative at Hyde at the time. He gave up that work, and for a time kept a small shop in Manchester, but his life from that point did not go well, as he tried to live mainly by selling his poems, and took to drink. He gained a grant from the royal bounty and from 1845 to 1851 he was salaried editor of the Ancient Shepherd's Quarterly Magazine, published at Ashton-under-Lyne.

Prince remarried, to Ann Taylor (born 1813 or 1814), on 30 March 1862 at Mottram in Longdendale, Lancashire. Ann was illiterate, but more thrifty, and tidy than his first wife. Soon after the wedding, Prince had a stroke. He died on 5 May 1866 at Brook Street, Hyde, and was buried in St George's churchyard, Hyde. One daughter survived him.

== Works ==
Prince began to write verse in 1827, and from the following year he was an occasional contributor to the Phœnix and other local periodicals.

After moving to Long Millgate in Manchester in 1840 and opening a book and stationery store, Prince began frequenting the nearby Sun Inn and became a popular figure among the regular clientele of working class intellectuals. He formed a close friendship group with other poets and writers, around which a working class poetry collective known as the Sun Inn Group emerged. The Group established the Lancashire Literary Association in 1841, and in 1842 they published their only anthology, The Festive Wreath. Other members of the Sun Inn Group included Samuel Bamford, John Bolton Rogerson, Isabella Banks, Robert Rose, Charles Swain, and Robert Story.

In 1842 he undertook a journey on foot to London, recording his impressions and experiences in a series of letters to Bradshaw's Journal, edited by George Falkner, another member of the Sun Inn Group. His move away from Manchester to Blackburn in 1843 was one of the factors leading to the Sun Inn Group's dissolution.

Besides the Hours with the Muses, of which six editions were issued between 1840 and 1857, Prince published:

- Dreams and Realities, Ashton-under-Lyne, 1847
- The Poetic Rosary, Manchester, 1850
- Autumn Leaves, Hyde, 1856
- Miscellaneous Poems, 1861

A collected edition of his poetical works was published, in two volumes, by Robert Alexander Douglas-Lithgow in 1880.

According to a present-day critic, Prince "disapproved of socialism and Chartism and his verse rarely touches on social issues; it consists mostly of anodyne lyrics on religion and nature, and, considering the circumstances of his life, is astonishingly sunny and optimistic."

== Notes ==
Attribution This article incorporates text from a publication now in the public domain: Lee, Sidney, ed. (1896). "Prince, John Critchley". Dictionary of National Biography. Vol. 46. London: Smith, Elder & Co.
