= The Three Kings (film) =

1929 film

- Directed by: Hans Steinhoff
- Written by: Curt J. Braun; Henry Edwards
- Starring: Henry Edwards; Evelyn Holt; Warwick Ward; John F. Hamilton
- Cinematography: Nicolas Farkas
- Music by: Hansheinrich Dransmann
- Production companies: British & Foreign; Orplid-Film
- Distributed by: British & Foreign; Messtro-Orplid
- Release date: January 1929
- Running time: 6,284 feet
- Countries: Germany; United Kingdom
- Languages: Silent; English/German intertitles

The Three Kings (German: Ein Mädel und drei Clowns) is a 1929 British-German silent drama film directed by Hans Steinhoff and starring Henry Edwards, Evelyn Holt and Warwick Ward. Separate versions were released in Germany and Britain. At a circus in Blackpool, a violent rivalry breaks out between two of the performers over a woman.

== Cast ==
- Henry Edwards as Edgar King
- Evelyn Holt as Maria
- Warwick Ward as Frank King
- John F. Hamilton as Charlie King
- Clifford McLaglen as Fredo

== Bibliography ==
- Low, Rachael. History of the British Film, 1918-1929. George Allen & Unwin, 1971.
