= The Manchester Man (film) =

1920 film by Bert Wynne

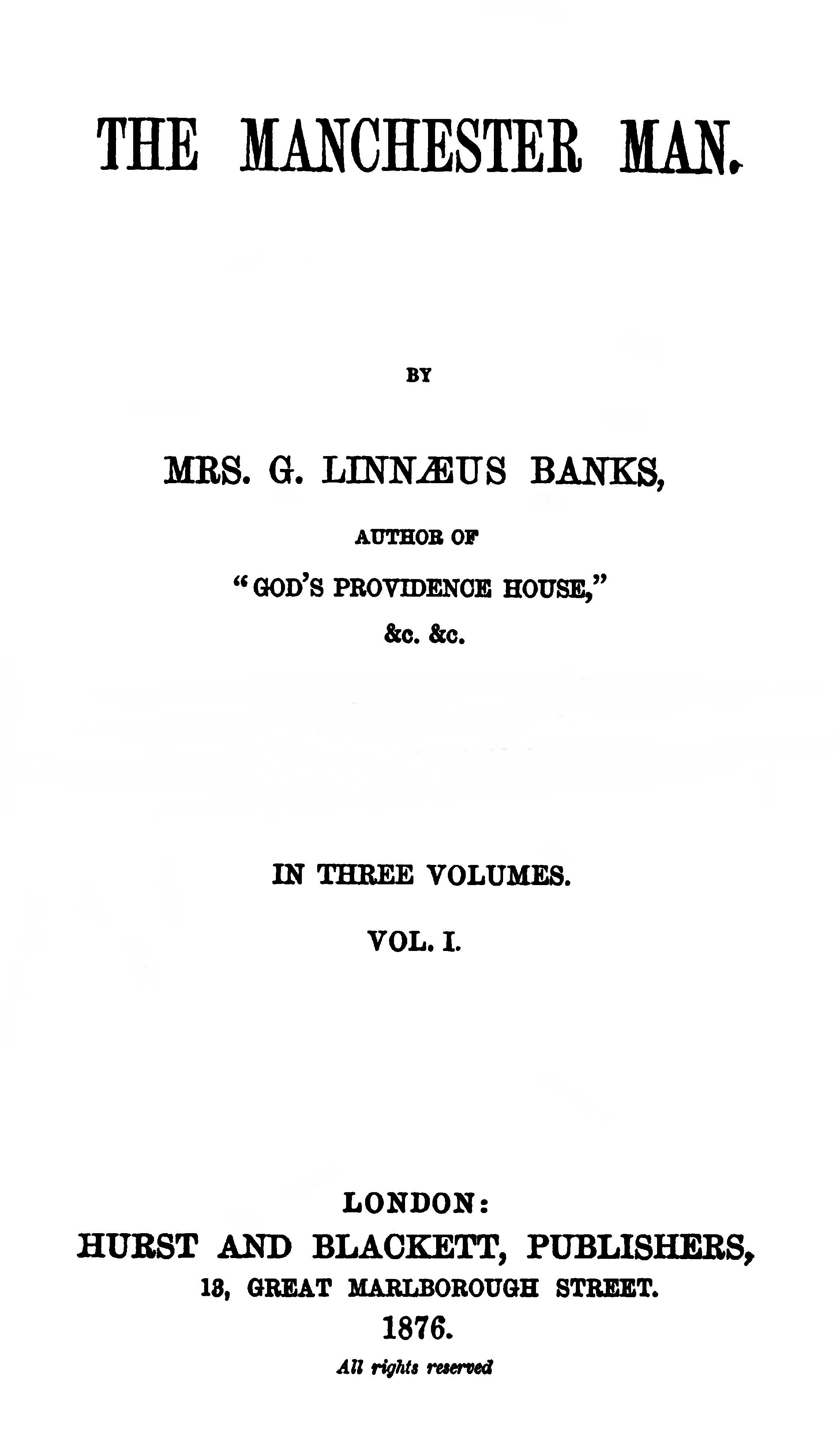
- Cover of the first edition of The Manchester Man
- Directed by: Bert Wynne
- Written by: Isabella Banks (novel); Eliot Stannard
- Starring: Hayford Hobbs; Aileen Bagot; Joan Hester; Warwick Ward
- Production company: Ideal Film Company
- Distributed by: Ideal Film Company
- Release date: 1920
- Country: United Kingdom
- Language: English

The Manchester Man is a 1920 British silent drama film directed by Bert Wynne and starring Hayford Hobbs, Aileen Bagot and Joan Hestor. It was an adaptation of the 1876 novel The Manchester Man by Isabella Banks. It follows the lifetime of a Manchester resident Jabez Clegg during the turbulent 19th century.

The plot has been summarized by Denis Gifford as "Lancashire, 1800. Clerk loves merchant's daughter who elopes with crook."

== Cast ==
- Hayford Hobbs - Jabez Clegg
- Aileen Bagot - Augusta Ashton
- Joan Hestor - Bess Clegg
- Warwick Ward - Captain Aspinall
- A. Harding Steerman - Mr Ashton
- Dora De Winton - Mrs Ashton
- Hubert Willis - Simon Clegg
- William Burchill - Reverend Jotty Brooks
- Charles Pelly - Kit
- Cecil Calvert - Man of Affairs
