= Crookham, Northumberland =

Village in Northumberland, England

Coordinates: 55.637°N 2.135°W

Crookham
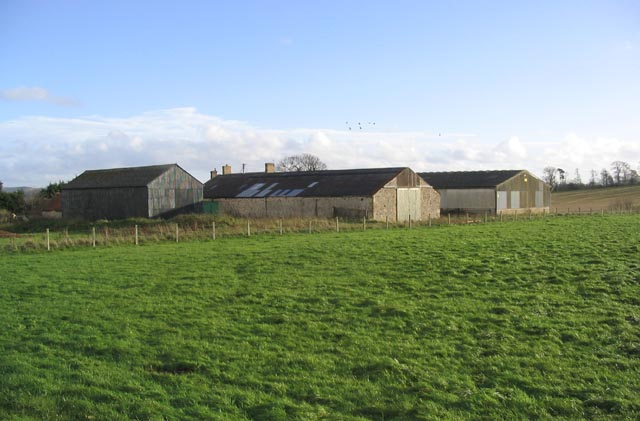
- Encampment Farm

- Location within Northumberland
- OS grid reference: NT914380
- Unitary authority: Northumberland
- Ceremonial county: Northumberland
- Region: North East
- Country: England
- Sovereign state: United Kingdom
- Post town: CORNHILL-ON-TWEED
- Postcode district: TD12
- Dialling code: 01890
- Police: Northumbria
- Fire: Northumberland
- Ambulance: North East
- UK Parliament: North Northumberland

Crookham is a village on the River Till in Northumberland, in England. It is situated approximately 8 km (5.0 mi) to the east of Coldstream and 14 km (8.7 mi) northwest of Wooler. It has three farms, Crookham Sandyford, Crookham Eastfield, and Crookham Westfield. Recorded as "Crucum" in 1244, the village name derived from the Old English for "Settlement at the Bend" (of the River Till).

== History ==
The poet Robert Story was educated for some time at Crookham.

The Till Valley Archaeological Society holds meetings and events in Crookham Village Hall. The Society's aim is to promote the archaeology, heritage, and history of the Till Valley. Its members take part as volunteers in archaeological excavations and field walking in north Northumberland, most notably on or around the site of the Battle of Flodden.

== Landmarks ==
Crookham contains a coach house and a post office.
