= Isabella Banks =

English novelist and poet (1821–1897)

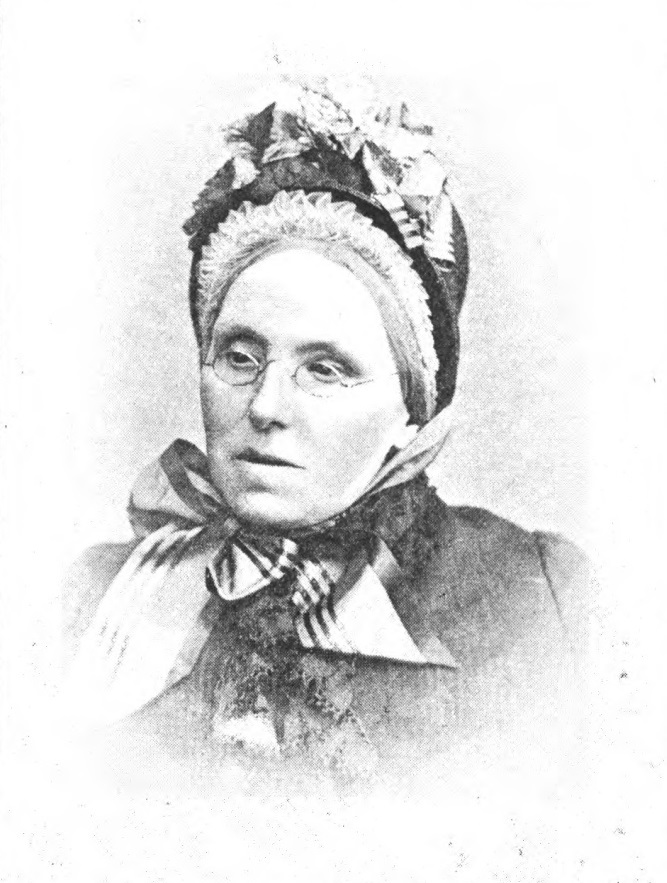
- Banks, c. 1888
- Born: Isabella Varley; 25 March 1821; Manchester, Lancashire, England
- Died: 4 May 1897 (aged 76); Dalston, London, England
- Resting place: Abney Park Cemetery, Stoke Newington, London, England
- Occupations: Novelist; poet
- Spouse: George Linnaeus Banks (m. 1846; died 1881)
- Writing career
- Period: Victorian
- Notable work: The Manchester Man

Isabella Banks (née Varley; 25 March 1821 – 4 May 1897), also known as Mrs G. Linnaeus Banks, was an English novelist and poet. Born in Manchester, England, Banks is most widely remembered today for her book The Manchester Man, published in 1876.

== Early years ==
Isabella Varley, was born on 25 March 1821 above her father's pharmacy at 10 Oldham Street, in the area now known as Manchester's Northern Quarter. Isabella developed a keen interest in the history of Manchester and its political development. Both her father James and her mother Amelia were active in politics long before the period when the City of Manchester had its own parliamentary representatives; her father held several official civic roles in his lifetime as a town alderman and magistrate.

== Writing career ==
Varley's flair for writing was first noted when The Manchester Guardian published her poem "A Dying Girl to her Mother" in 1837. Around the same time she began to frequent the Sun Inn on Long Millgate in Manchester, a pub popular with poets, writers, and other working class intellectuals, and became part of a poetry collective known as the Sun Inn Group alongside figures such as Samuel Bamford, John Critchley Prince, John Bolton Rogerson, Robert Rose, Elijah Ridings, and Robert Story. However, she was too shy to participate fully in the Group's meetings, preferring to hide behind a velvet curtain at the back of the room during readings, and asking others to read her own works aloud on her behalf. She contributed to the Sun Inn Group's only published anthology, The Festive Wreath, in 1842.

It was through the Sun Inn Group that Varley was paid for her writing for the first time, when she was commissioned by Rogerson, editor of Oddfellows' Magazine from 1841 to 1848. She also met her husband, George Banks—a journalist and editor who reported from across the UK—when both worked for the magazine. They married in 1846, after which she mostly published under the name of "Mrs G. Linnaeus Banks," although she sometimes still wrote under her maiden name. Her first collection of poetry, Ivy Leaves, was published in 1844.

She had eight children (although only three survived into adulthood). In the early 1860s, Isabella's eldest child died (then aged 14), and her sense of loss is believed to have inspired her to write her first novel, God's Providence House: The famous story of old Chester, which presented an absorbing story of love and adventure set in the days of highwaymen and plague around the area of Chester in Cheshire, in which one character lived on Watergate Street with "God's Providence is Mine Inheritance" written on its frontage beam, being one of the few houses not struck by plague.

In 1865 she co-authored Daisies in the Grass: a collection of songs and poems, with her husband. The Making of William Edwards or The Story of the Bridge of Beauty was also their joint endeavour. Her many literary works included The Watchmaker's Daughter and Other Tales, Forbidden to Marry (two vols), More than Coronets (1881), Caleb Booth's Clerk: A Lancashire Story (1878), Glory: A Wiltshire Story, Sybilla and other Stories (1885), Miss Pringle's Pearls, and Bond Slaves – the story of struggle (1893), a social novel about Luddites in the North of England. Some of these works went through many editions, re-appearing several times during the 20th century, and some are currently published for sale today as print-on demand editions.

=== The Manchester Man ===
Banks's novel The Manchester Man was first serialised in Cassell's Magazine between January and November 1874, before being published in three volumes in 1876. The book became her most lasting achievement and is considered to be an important social and historical novel, charting the rise of Jabez Clegg, the eponymous "Manchester Man", from the time of the Napoleonic Wars to the first Reform Act. His personal fortunes, from the near tragic snatch of his crib from the River Irk, create a tale of romance and melodrama, his life from apprentice to master and from poverty to wealth, mirroring the growth and prosperity of the city. This is achieved in a politico-historical setting, with vivid accounts of the Peterloo Massacre of 1819 and the Corn-Law riots (the Anti-Corn Law League was formed in Manchester in 1838). In 1896, the year before she died, a well-illustrated edition of The Manchester Man was published with forty-six plates and three maps.

The book is still read throughout the world (following republication in 1991 and again in 1998), and its heroes, Jabez Clegg and Joshua Brooks, are commemorated locally in the names of Manchester public houses. A quotation from the novel ('Mutability is the epitaph of worlds / Change alone is changeless / People drop out of the history of a life as of a land though their work or their influence remains') forms the epitaph on the tombstone of Tony Wilson, one of the founders of Factory Records in Manchester.

Anthony Trollope greatly admired Isabella Banks's contribution to literature, and is reported to have observed that her "reward in literary life had fallen short of [her] deserts". Shortly thereafter a charity Trollope was involved with, the Royal Literary Fund, provided Isabella with £355.

== Political interests ==
Isabella Banks was involved in campaigning for women's rights, lecturing on Woman, as She was, as She is, and as She may Be. She was a member of the Ladies Committee of the Anti-Corn Law League from 1842.

== Death and memorial ==
Banks died on 4 May 1897 at her home in London. She was buried in the Little Elm Walk at Abney Park Cemetery, Stoke Newington, in London, alongside her husband, who had died in 1881. In 2015, she was honoured with a street named after her within Manchester's First Street development.
