= Wark on Tweed =

Village in Northumberland, England

Coordinates: 55.6410°N 2.2771°W

Wark
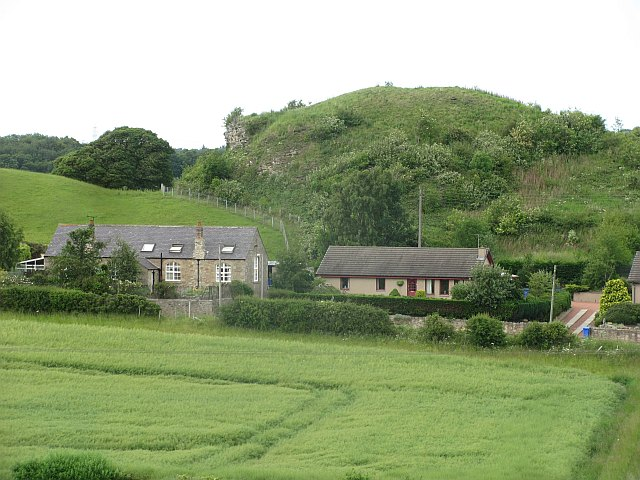
- Wark on Tweed with the ruins of the castle behind

- Location within Northumberland
- OS grid reference: NT826386
- Unitary authority: Northumberland
- Ceremonial county: Northumberland
- Region: North East
- Country: England
- Sovereign state: United Kingdom
- Post town: CORNHILL-ON-TWEED
- Postcode district: TD12
- Dialling code: 01890
- Police: Northumbria
- Fire: Northumberland
- Ambulance: North East
- UK Parliament: North Northumberland

Wark or Wark on Tweed is a village in the English county of Northumberland. It lies about 15 mi (24 km) south west of Berwick-upon-Tweed.

It is on the south bank of the River Tweed, which marks the border between England and Scotland.

== Landmarks ==
The ruins of Wark on Tweed Castle, originally an early 12th-century motte-and-bailey, lie at the west end of the village.

== The Ba Green ==
The border between Scotland and England runs down the middle of the River Tweed, but between the villages of Wark and Cornhill, the Scottish border comes south of the river to enclose a small riverside meadow around 2 acres (0.8 hectares) to 3 acres (1.2 hectares). This piece of land is known as the Ba Green. It is said locally that every year the men of Coldstream (to the north of the river) would play mob football with the men of Wark at ba, and the winning side would claim the Ba Green for their country. As Coldstream grew to have a larger population than Wark, the Coldstream men always defeated the Wark men at the game, so the land became a permanent part of Scotland.

== Notable people ==
- Robert Story (poet), 1795-1860
