= Howtel =

Village in Northumberland, England

Coordinates: 55.604°N 2.168°W

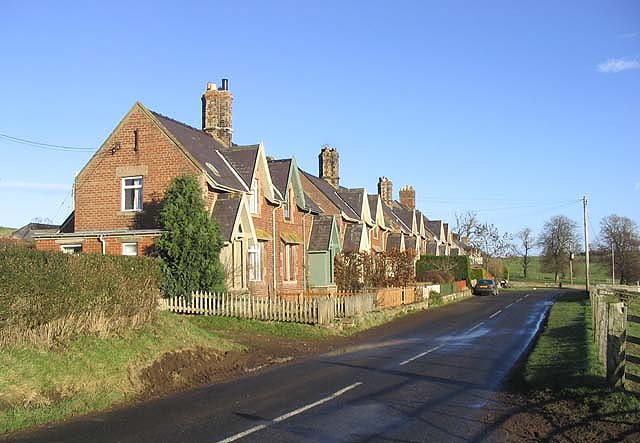
- Houses at Howtel

- Location within Northumberland
- OS grid reference: NT8934
- Civil parish: Kilham
- Unitary authority: Northumberland
- Ceremonial county: Northumberland
- Region: North East
- Country: England
- Sovereign state: United Kingdom
- Post town: CORNHILL-ON-TWEED
- Postcode district: TD12
- Police: Northumbria
- Fire: Northumberland
- Ambulance: North East
- UK Parliament: Berwick-upon-Tweed

Howtel is a village and former civil parish, now in the parish of Kilham, in Northumberland, England about 8 miles (13 km) northwest of Wooler. The name Howtel is thought to mean Low Ground with a Holt or Wood. In 1951 the parish had a population of 75.

== History ==
Howtel once possessed a strong pele, mentioned in the report of Sir Robert Bowes on the Border in 1542 as one of several that had been "rased and casten downe" by the Scots. The surviving ruins of Howtel Tower are now surrounded by farm buildings. The village is listed, too, along with Lanton, Milfield, Heatherslaw, Branxton, Heaton, Pawston, and Mindrum in the order of the watch in this part of the Border, as set forth in an act of Edward VI's reign. The villages mentioned had to supply a nightly patrol of fourteen men, who made their rounds on horseback. At the close of the nineteenth century the Alnwick and Cornhill branch of the North East railway passed close by, and the nearest station was at Kirknewton. Watson-Askew-Robertson was named as the lord of the manor. There was a Presbyterian chapel, which was built in 1850 to seat 350 people. The village also had a national school, built in 1875 for 60 children. The average attendance was 45 and the schoolmaster was Robert Strong. The census returns for 1891 show that there were 116 people living in Howtel; this represented a slight drop from the beginning of the century when the returns stood at 186.

== Governance ==
Howtel is in the parliamentary constituency of Berwick-upon-Tweed. Howtel was formerly a township in Kirk-Newton parish, from 1866 Howtel was a civil parish in its own right until it was abolished on 1 April 1955 and merged with Kilham.
