= George Linnaeus Banks =

British journalist, editor, poet and playwright (1821–1881)

- Born: 2 March 1821; Birmingham, Warwickshire, England
- Died: 3 May 1881 (aged 60); Dalston, London, England
- Spouse: Isabella Banks (married 1846–1881)

George Linnaeus Banks (2 March 1821 – 3 May 1881) was a British journalist, editor, poet, playwright, amateur actor, orator, and Methodist. His wife was the author Isabella Banks.

George was born in Birmingham, the son of a seedsman familiar with the plant nomenclature of Linnaeus.

== Career ==
After a brief experience in a variety of trades, in his late teens George Banks became a contributor to various newspapers, and subsequently a playwright, being the author of plays, burlesques and lyrics. Between 1848 and 1864 he edited in succession a variety of newspapers, including the Birmingham Mercury and the Daily Express of Dublin.

George Banks' plays included The Slave King, written for the black actor Ira Aldridge, and The Swiss Father; his popular songs included The Minstrel King, Warwickshire Will, and Dandy Jim of Caroline, based on a negro melody; and his poetry included Daisies in the Grass (1865). Some of his more popular lines were frequently used by platform and pulpit orators, notably his lyrical What I Live For:

"I live for those who love me, for those who know me true; for the heaven that smiles above me and awaits my spirit too. For the cause that lacks assistance, for the wrong that needs resistance, for the future in the distance, and the good that I can do."

== Personal life ==
George Banks died of cancer and pneumonia in Dalston, Hackney, close to London, and is buried nearby at Abney Park Cemetery, Stoke Newington, with his wife, the author Isabella Banks.
