= The Manchester Man (novel) =

British novel

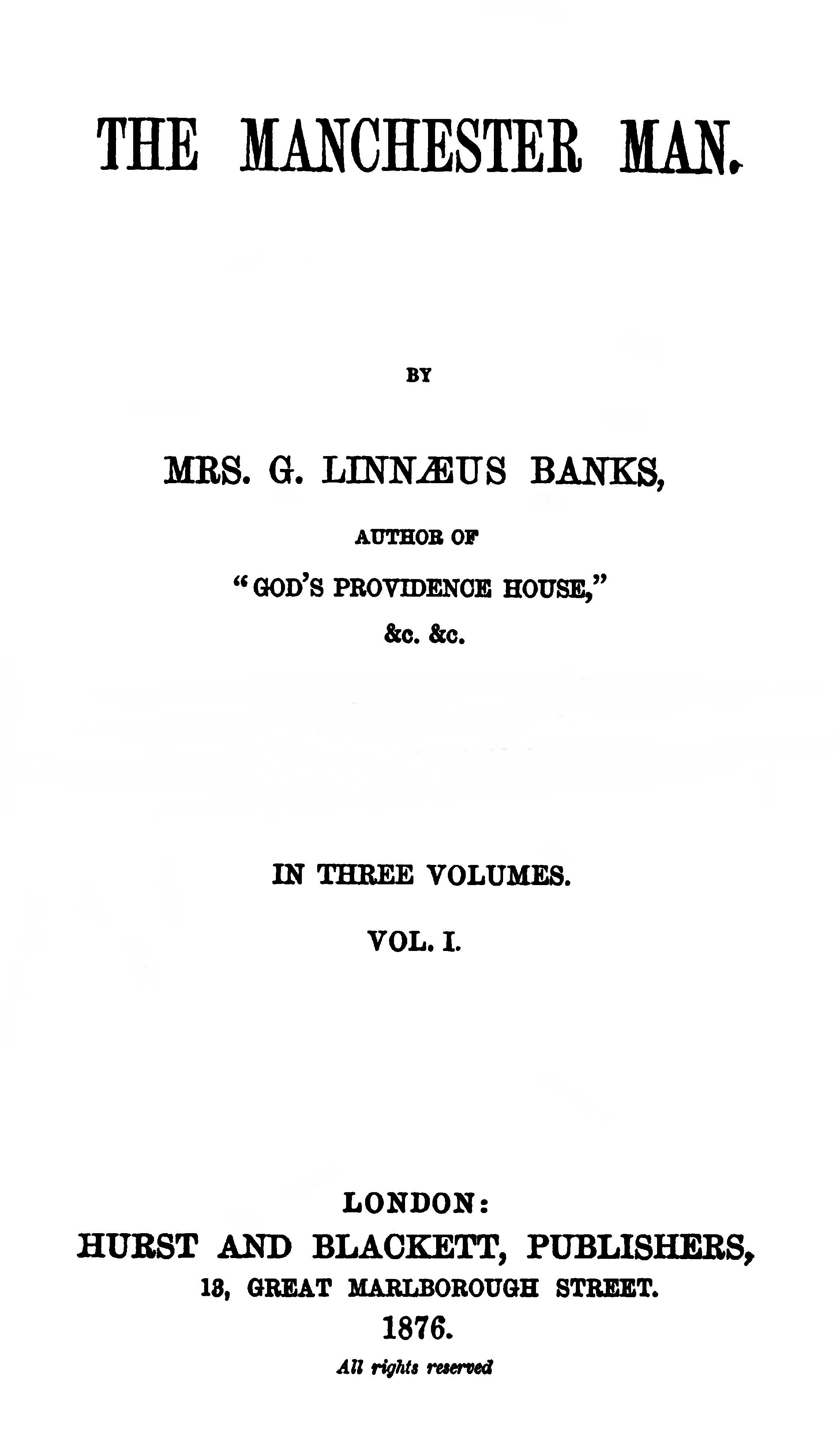
First edition title page

The Manchester Man is a novel by the British writer Isabella Banks. It was first published in three volumes in 1876 under her married name, Mrs G. Linnæus Banks. The story follows the life of a Manchester resident, Jabez Clegg, during the nineteenth century and his rise to prosperity in the booming industrial city. It depicts a number of real historical events such as the Peterloo Massacre.

== Plot ==
An orphaned child is rescued by a tanner and his daughter from the River Irk during a storm. Simon, the tanner learns that the child's family did not survive the flood and Bess, his daughter, decides to foster the child herself. They christen him Jabez Clegg and he is educated as a Blue Coat Boy at Chetham's Hospital School under the supervision of clergyman Joshua Brookes. Jabez meets his antagonist, the wealthy Laurence Aspinall, who is to be a rival for the rest of his life. Meanwhile, Bess is longing for the return of her lover, Tom Hulme, who is fighting in the Napoleonic wars. On his return, he sees Bess with the child and assumes that she has forgotten about him and remarried. Later, Jabez rises up the social ladder to become apprentice under Mr Ashton, whose daughter Augusta catches the eye of Jabez. A love diamond is created by Jabez, Augusta, Aspinall and Augusta's cousin, Eleanor.

== Historicity ==
The Manchester Man is remarkable for its historical detail. It contains vivid accounts of early 19th century textiles and fashions, historical characters, and historical events including Peterloo and the sinking of the Emma, based on unpublished eye-witness accounts. The novel includes appendices in which the author delineates the historical versus fictional content.

== Film adaptation ==
In 1920 the novel was adapted into a silent film The Manchester Man directed by Bert Wynne.

== Cultural references ==
A quotation from the novel forms the epitaph on the tombstone of Tony Wilson, one of the founders of Factory Records in Manchester.

== Bibliography ==
- Briggs, Asa. Victorian Cities. University of California Press, 1993.
- Sutherland, Joan. The Stanford Companion to Victorian Fiction. Santford University Press, 1989.
