= Elijah Ridings =

British poet (1802–1872)

Elijah Ridings (1802–1872) was a British poet, writer, and bookseller from Lancashire, England. He was known for his book, The Village Muse which contained biographical information and his political opinions. He was part of a group of poets known as the Sun Inn Group. He also wrote a book called Streams from an Old Fountain, which was a collection of humorous and satirical pieces. He was the brother of Horatio Ridings, a poet and writer.

== Works ==
- The Poetical Works of Elijah Ridings (1840)
- The Village Muse: Containing the Complete Poetical Works of Elijah Ridings (1844)
- Streams from an Old Fountain (1857)
- Pictures of Life (1860)

== Sources ==
- Procter, Richard Wright (1880). Memorials of Bygone Manchester: With Glimpses of the Environs. Creative Media Partners, LLC. ISBN 9781020713255.
- Evans, John (1869). In The Lancashire Poets: Their Lives and Works.
- Collier, John (1862). In The Works of Tim Bobbin, Esq: In Prose and Verse. Creative Media Partners, LLC. ISBN 9781345804744.
