= Robert Story (poet) =

British poet (1795–1860)

Robert Story (17 October 1795 – 7 July 1860), known as "the Craven Poet", was an English poet.

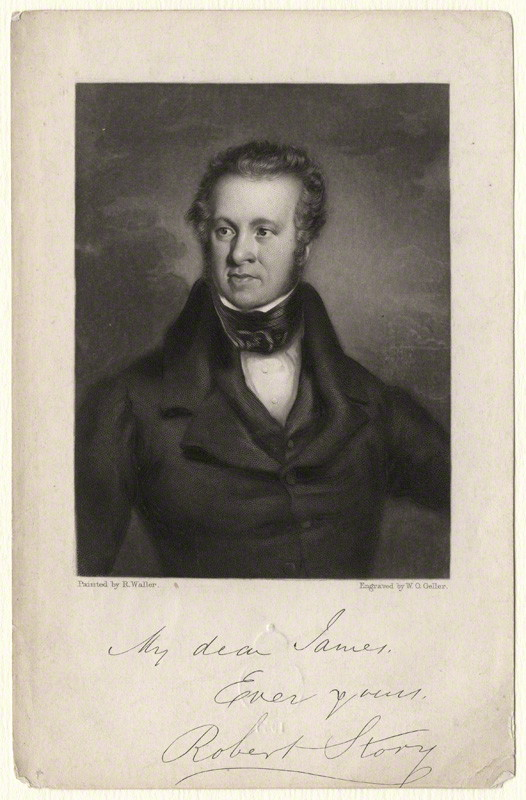
Robert Story by William Overend Geller, after Richard Waller

== Biography ==
Story was born at Wark on Tweed in Northumberland in the northeastern England in 1795. His father Robin Story (d. 1809), was an agricultural labourer, and his mother, Mary Hooliston, was originally from Lauder, Scotland. Due to his father's work, the family moved frequently around the villages in the county. He was educated at Wark School under Mr Kinton and then at Crookham. When just 10 years old, Story ran away to accompany a lame fiddler on an excursion through the Scottish Borders for a month, and about a year later the family moved to Howtel, where Story attended the local school. He later claimed that this was where "I learned nearly all that I ever learned from a Master—namely to read badly, to write worse, and to cipher a little farther, perhaps than to the Rule of Three." There he was introduced to Divine Songs for Children, and discovered a love of poetry while reading on the hills, where he was employed first as a gardener from around 1807, but found more congenial service as a shepherd, an occupation commemorated in one of his lyrics, ‘Pours the spring on Howdsden yet’. In the summer of 1810 he began to teach reading, writing, and arithmetic in a school at Humbleton, but often dabbled with labouring work in the fields like Burns, as evidenced in his poem The Harvest (1816), before returning to teaching.

By 1820 he had moved to Gargrave in North Yorkshire where he opened a school. He married Ellen Ellison on 17 May 1823, mentioned in some of his early poems. In 1825 he published a volume of poetry, Craven Blossoms. Story was a strong opponent of parliamentary reform and found himself most unpopular with many parents of the children in his school who withdrew them from his teaching by about 1830.

Finding himself in financial difficulty, he wrote The Magic Fountain in 1829, and in 1834 he expressed poetic support for the Conservative Party, in a work entitled The Isles are Awake. Dependent on his friends for a period in the 1830s, he achieved success in publishing The Outlaw (1839), a historical drama set during the reign of Henry VIII and Love and Literature, an autobiographical work published in 1842.

During this period he also became associated with the Sun Inn Group, a collective of working class poets in Manchester named after the pub where they held their meetings, and he contributed to their only published anthology, The Festive Wreath, in 1842. He also befriended William Gourley, a mathematician, around this time.

In 1843, Sir Robert Peel's Conservative government offered a small post for Story in the Audit Office, which saw him move to London. His first few years in London were of considerable hardship, during which he lost four of his children. In 1845 he published Songs and Lyrical Poems (3rd edn, 1849), and in 1852 a versified tale of the heptarchy entitled Guthrum the Dane, a medieval romance.

In 1854, Story paid a visit to Paris where he was presented to Napoleon III as a successor of Burns. Algernon Percy, the Duke of Northumberland, became a patron in 1857 and financed an edition of his works. In 1859 Story was invited to Ayr for the centenary celebrations of Robert Burns, where he recited his poem on Burns. The Bradfordian considered that "he stands high among the minor poets of Great Britain, and many of his sweet lyrics will most assuredly descend to and be highly admired by posterity, and by none more than Yorkshiremen." He died at his home at 12 Harley Street, Battersea, London on 7 July 1860 and was buried at the Brompton Cemetery.
