= John Bolton Rogerson =

English poet (1809–1859)

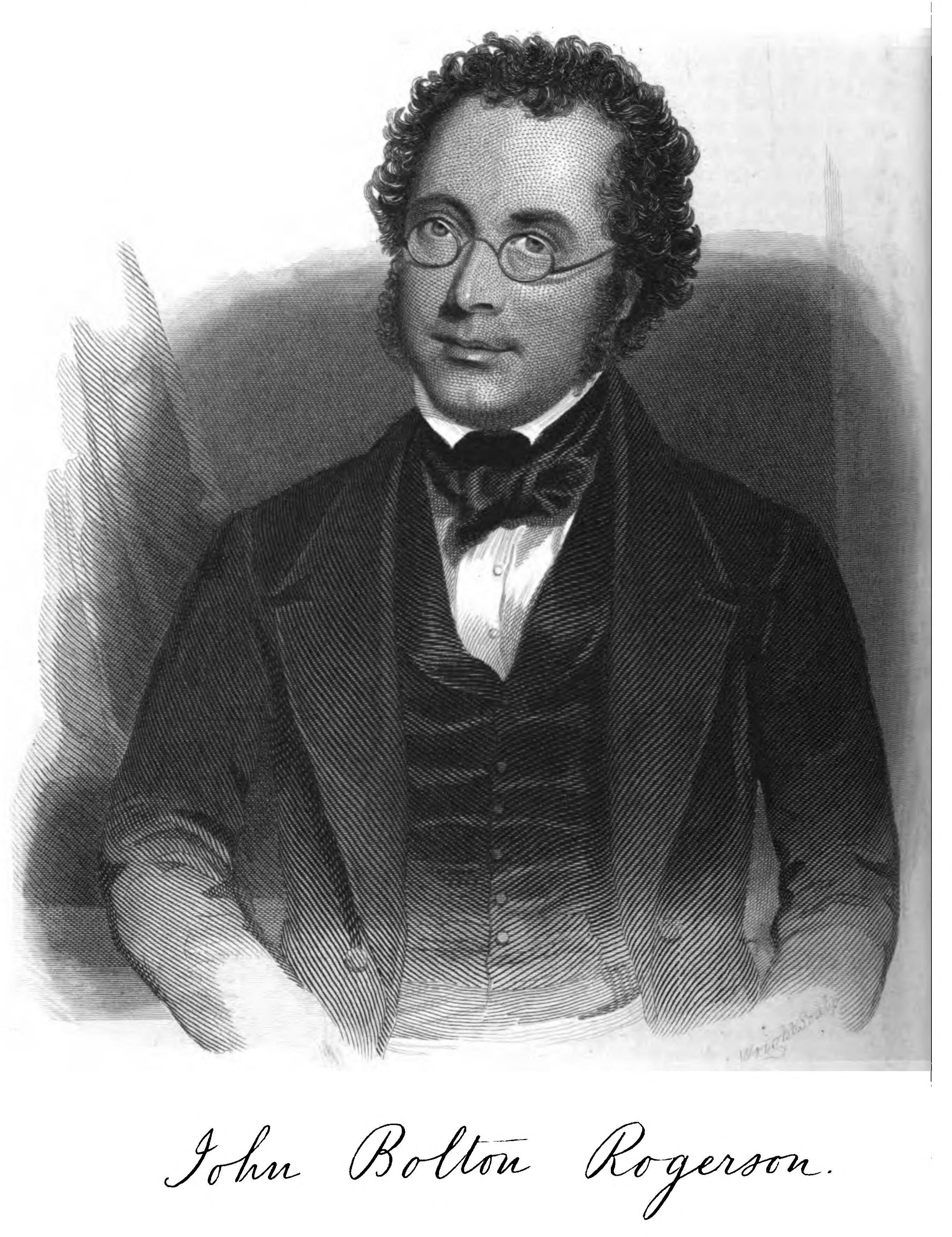
Engraved portrait and signature of John Bolton Rogerson (1847)

John Bolton Rogerson (1809–1859) was an English poet. He worked in a mercantile firm and afterwards with a solicitor in Manchester; kept a bookshop from 1834 to 1841; contributed to newspapers, and subsequently engaged in journalistic and other enterprises. He published several volumes of poems.

== Life ==
John Bolton Rogerson was born at Manchester on 20 January 1809, the son of James Rogerson by his wife, Elisabeth. At the age of thirteen he left school and began work in a mercantile firm, but was afterwards placed with a solicitor. Law being distasteful to him, he opened a bookshop in Manchester in 1834, which he carried on until 1841.

Around 1840 he became part of a collective of working class poets known as the Sun Inn Group, which met regularly at a pub on Long Millgate in Manchester. While its key social figure was John Critchley Prince, Rogerson was its most important organisational figure, responsible for arranging and chairing many of its meetings. Rogerson was also responsible for compiling and editing the Sun Inn Group's only published anthology, The Festive Wreath (1842). As editor of Oddfellows' Magazine from 1841 until 1848, he gave a number of Sun Inn Group members—including Isabella Banks—their first paid poetry commissions.

The next few years were devoted to literary work, and in 1849 he was appointed registrar of the Manchester cemetery at Harpurhey. He was an amateur actor, was president for some years of the Manchester Shakespearean Society, and was for a short time on the staff of the Manchester Theatre Royal. In his youth he had written a play in three acts, called The Baron of Manchester, which was produced at a local theatre. He also lectured on literary and educational subjects.

From early years he was an eager if desultory reader, and soon became a writer of verse, but destroyed most of his juvenile efforts. He first appeared in print in 1826 in the Manchester Guardian, and in the following year wrote for the Liverpool Kaleidoscope. In 1828 he joined John Hewitt in editing the Phœnix, or Manchester Literary Journal, a performance which lasted only a few months. He was editor of the Falcon, or Journal of Literature in 1831, Oddfellows' Magazine from 1841 until 1848, and the Chaplet, a Poetical Offering for the Lyceum Bazaar in 1841 (all published in Manchester).

Chronic rheumatism disabled him about 1855 from continuing his duties as registrar. He afterwards kept a tavern in Newton Street, Ancoats, Manchester, and in 1857 was master of a school at Accrington. In the succeeding year he was awarded a government pension of £50; then he retired to the Isle of Man, where he died on 15 October 1859, and was interred at Kirk Braddan, near Douglas. His wife was Mary Anne, born Horabin, by whom he left several children.

== Works ==
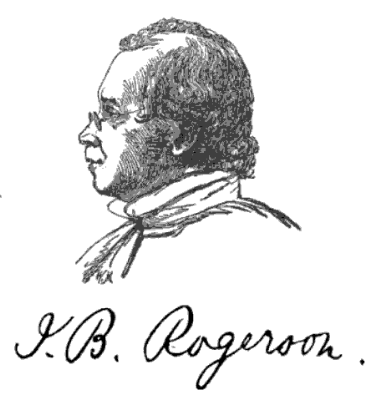
Portrait and autograph-facsimile of John Bolton Rogerson (1860)

His separate publications were:

1. Rhyme, Romance, and Revery, London, 1840; 2nd edition 1852.
2. A Voice from the Town, and other Poems, 1842.
3. The Wandering Angel, and other Poems, 1844.
4. Poetical Works, 1850, with portrait.
5. Flowers for all Seasons (verses and essays), 1854.
6. Musings in Many Moods, 1859, which contains most of the poems in the preceding volumes.

According to Charles William Sutton, "His works, though pleasing, lack originality and vigour."

== Sources ==
- Sutton, C. W.; Stephan, Megan A. (2004). "Rogerson, John Bolton (1809–1859), poet". Oxford Dictionary of National Biography (online ed.). Oxford University Press. doi:10.1093/ref:odnb/24007. (Subscription, Wikipedia Library access or UK public library membership required.)

Attribution:

- This article incorporates text from a publication now in the public domain: Sutton, Charles William (1897). "Rogerson, John Bolton". In Lee, Sidney (ed.). Dictionary of National Biography. Vol. 49. London: Smith, Elder & Co. pp. 148–149.
