= Samuel Bamford =

English radical reformer (1788–1872)

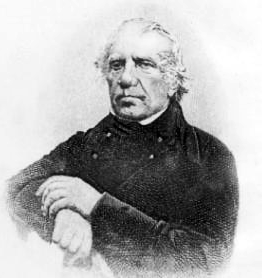
Samuel Bamford

Samuel Bamford (28 February 1788 – 13 April 1872) was an English radical reformer and writer born in Middleton, Lancashire. He wrote on the subject of northern English dialect and wrote some of his better known verse in it.

== Biography ==
Bamford was one of five children born to Daniel Bamford (a muslin weaver and part-time teacher, and later master of the Salford workhouse), and his wife, Hannah. He was baptised on 11 April 1788 at St Leonard's Church, Middleton.

After his father withdrew him from Manchester Grammar School, Bamford became a weaver and then a warehouseman in Manchester. Exposure to Homer's Iliad and to the poems of John Milton influenced Bamford to begin writing poetry himself.

On 24 June 1810, he married Jemema (or Jemima) Sheppard, who he called 'Mima', at the Collegiate Church of St Mary, St Denys and St George, in Manchester, now known as Manchester Cathedral.

Bamford and Mima had at least one child, born outside of wedlock. The "sweet infant, just of age to begin noticing things," was kept a secret and revealed to him the day after the couple married. According to Emma Griffin, Bamford and Mima's daughter, Ann, was six months old at the time and had been baptised in January 1810 under Jemima Sheppard's name. Griffin also notes that Bamford had another child out of wedlock to a "Yorkshire lass".

In 1851 or thereabouts, Bamford obtained a situation as a messenger for the Inland Revenue at Somerset House, but soon returned to weaving. The 1861 England Census records that Samuel, as a "public reader and agent" resided with Jemina in Hall Street, Manchester.

== Radicalism ==
Bamford's radical political beliefs led him to be heavily involved in resistance to the British government and to witness to several important historical events relating to working-class advocacy and public defiance.

=== Arrests for treason ===
In 1817 he was remanded in jail to the New Bailey Prison in Salford on suspicion of high treason, on account of his political activities. From there he was taken to London and examined before the Privy Council, presided over by Lord Sidmouth as Home Secretary. After promising future good behaviour, Bamford was released and allowed to return to his cottage at Middleton with his wife Jemima.

In August 1819, he led a group from Middleton to St Peter's Fields for a meeting that pressed for parliamentary reform and repeal of the Corn Laws. There they witnessed the Peterloo Massacre, and Bamford was arrested and charged with treason. Although there was no evidence shown that either he or any of his group had been involved in the violence, he was found guilty of inciting a riot and sentenced to a year in Lincoln prison.

The massacre had a deep impact on Bamford, convincing him that state power always succeeded against radical militancy. He came to be seen as a voice for radical reform, but opposed to activism involving physical force. Bamford responded to the claim that his political group had used violence to pursue their reforming ends, in Passages in the Life of a Radical and Early Days (1840–1844), "It was not until we became infested by spies, incendiaries, and their dupes – distracting, misleading, and betraying – that physical force was mentioned amongst us. After that our moral power waned, and what we gained by the accession of demagogues, we lost by their criminal violence, and the estrangement of real friends."

=== Poetry and other writings ===
Bamford was the author of poetry mostly in standard English, but of those in dialect, several that showed sympathy with the conditions of the working classes became widely popular. Around 1840 he also became associated with the Sun Inn Group, a collective of fellow working class poets who met regularly at the Sun Inn on Long Millgate in Manchester, where his status as a Peterloo veteran made him an inspiration for younger peers. This was also when he authored Passages in the Life of a Radical (1840–1844), his authoritative history of the condition of the working classes in the years after the Battle of Waterloo.

In 1850, he published Tawk o'Seawth Lankeshur, by Samhul Beamfort, which, following the first one written in standard English, even adds a second title page and publishing information in local dialect. It begins:

Good lorjus days whot wofo times ar' these,
Pot bos ar scant, and dear ar seawl an cheese,
Eawr Gotum guides us seely sheep dun rob,
Oytch public trust is cheyng'd into a job;
Leys, taxes, customs, meyn our plucks to throb.

Continuing his interest in dialect, he also compiled The Dialect of South Lancashire in 1854.

=== Death and legacy ===
In the 1871 England Census, taken the year before Bamford's death, he is recorded as living at 109 Hall Street, Harpurhey, as a widower, with a widowed housekeeper, Elizabeth Hilton.

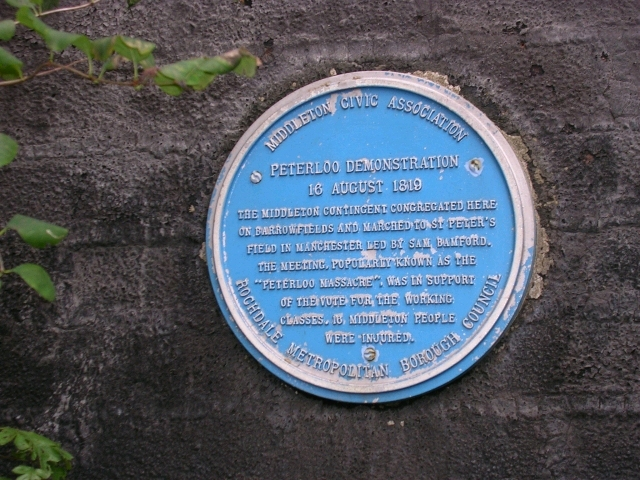
Plaque marking where the Middleton contingent gathered before being led by Bamford to St Peter's Fields

Relief of Samuel Bamford on the obelisk in Middleton Cemetery

Bamford died in Harpurhey on the 13th of April 1872 at the age of 84 and was given a public funeral in Middleton on the 20th, attended by several thousand people. A memorial obelisk unveiled in Middleton Cemetery in 1877 reads in part, "Bamford was a reformer when to be so was unsafe, and he suffered for his faith."

In 2000 The Diaries of Samuel Bamford were released, edited by Robert Poole and a critical Martin Hewitt, according to whom "Bamford's career, not least its virulent anti-Chartism, have tainted him with reformism, and left him to be invoked as an example of the weaknesses and limitations of early nineteenth-century working-class political assertion."

== Bibliography ==
Bamford's publications include:

- 1817: An Account of the Arrest and Imprisonment of Samuel Bamford, Middleton, on Suspicion of High Treason
- 1819: The Weaver Boy, or Miscellaneous Poetry
- 1834: Hours in the Bowers: Poems, etc.
- 1843: Homely Rhymes
- 1840–1844 Passages in the Life of a Radical (published in parts with many later editions, includes a glossary of Lancashire words).
- 1843: Poems
- 1844: Walks in South Lancashire and on its Borders. With letters, descriptions, narratives and observations current and incidental
- 1849: Early Days
- 1850: Tawk o'Seawth Lankeshur, by Samhul Beamfort]
- 1853: Life of Amos Ogden
- 1854: The Dialect of South Lancashire, or Tim Bobbin's Tummus and Meary, with his Rhymes, with Glossary
- 1864: Homely Rhymes, Poems and Reminiscences

== See also ==
- Blanketeers
