= Thomas Armstrong (painter) =

English artist and arts administrator

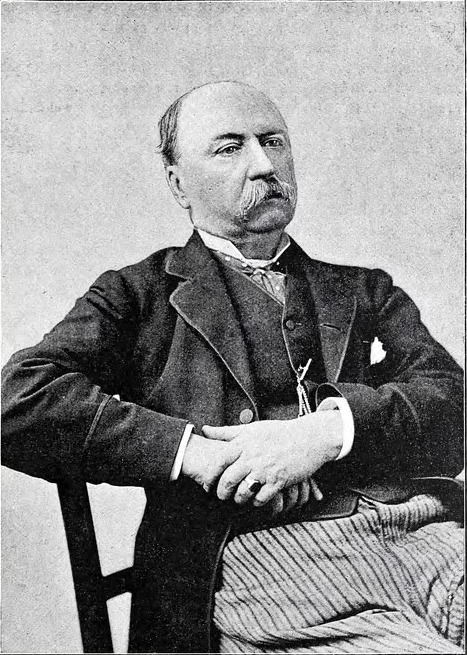
- Born: 1832; Manchester
- Died: 1911 (aged 78–79)
- Occupation: Painter

Thomas Armstrong (1832–1911) was an English artist and arts administrator.

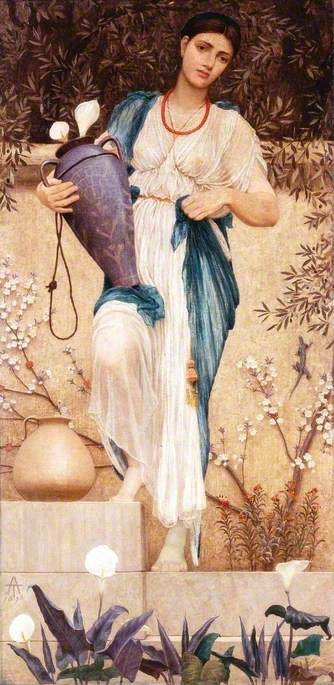
Woman with Lilies, 1876, Thomas Armstrong

== Early life ==
Born at Fallowfield, Manchester, on 19 October 1832, he was eldest son of Thomas Armstrong. Educated at a private school at Tarvin, near Chester, he learned drawing under Robert Crozier, of the Manchester Fine Art Academy. Deciding to adopt painting as a profession, he went to Paris in 1853, at the same period as the "Paris Gang" of George du Maurier, Edward John Poynter, and James Abbott McNeill Whistler. They formed the basis for du Maurier's novel Trilby.

== Artist ==
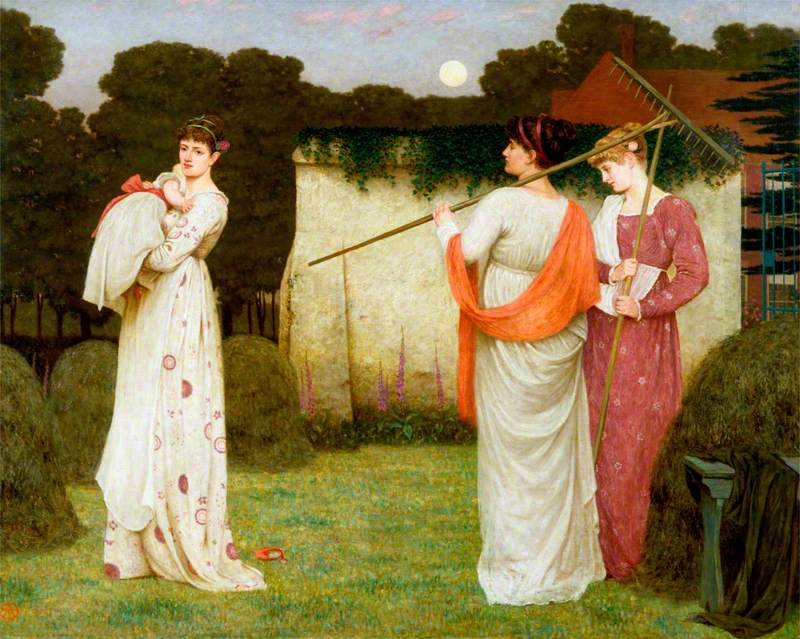
The Hay Field, 1869

At first Armstrong worked in the Académie Suisse, and then in the atelier of Ary Scheffer, who was a major influence. In the summer he joined Jean-François Millet, Karl Bodmer, and Charles Jacque at Barbizon. He studied in Academie Royale, Antwerp under Theodore van Lerius (1855-6), and in 1860 he was joined by du Maurier at the Kunstakademie Düsseldorf, where Eduard Bendemann was professor.

On his return to England, Armstrong worked on decorative painting in houses in the north, sometimes with his friend Randolph Caldecott. In 1864 he settled in London, exhibited regularly at the Royal Academy from 1865 to 1877, and subsequently up to 1881 at the Grosvenor Gallery. He helped Gertrude Jekyll found the School of Art Needlework.

== Administrator ==
In 1881 Armstrong was appointed director for art at the South Kensington Museum in succession to Edward Poynter, and had an immediate impact on its teaching, with his concept that craft and design required separate instruction. He supported the efforts of Walter Copland Perry to supply art students with models of antique sculpture, and implemented plans for a museum of casts. He supported an initiative on enamelling, under Pierre Adrien Dalpeyrat in 1886, and with Sir John Donnelly the School of Art Wood-carving. But one of his significant innovations was to invite Walter Crane to lecture in the National Art Training Schools. In this way the Arts and Crafts Movement found its way into public institutions.

== Later life ==
Armstrong retired from the South Kensington Museum in 1898, and was made C.B. He took up painting again, and made a mural tablet in plaster and copper for the church at Abbots Langley, to the memory of his only child.

Armstrong died suddenly at Abbots Langley on 24 April 1911, and was buried there.

== Family ==
On 22 April 1881 Armstrong married Alicia Mary Brine, daughter of Indian Army Colonel John Jones Brine, of Shaldon, Devon.

== Notes ==
Attribution

This article incorporates text from a publication now in the public domain: Lee, Sidney, ed. (1912). "Armstrong, Thomas". Dictionary of National Biography (2nd supplement). Vol. 1. London: Smith, Elder & Co.
