= Geoffrey Key =

British painter and sculptor (born 1941)

Geoffrey Key (born 13 May 1941 in Rusholme, Manchester, England) is a British painter and sculptor. A number of public art collections have examples of his work.

== Early life and education ==
Key's mother, Marion, worked as an illustrator, and encouraged him to draw.

Key was educated at the Manchester High School of Art, whose headmaster, Ernest Goodman, established the Salford Art Club. After Goodman's death, its members chose Key as the Honorary President.

In 1958, Key enrolled at the Manchester Regional College of Art. At the college, Key was tutored by sculptor Ted Roocroft and painter Harry Rutherford.

After gaining the National Diploma of Design and the Diploma of Associateship of Manchester, the latter with distinction, Key took up a postgraduate scholarship in sculpture. His academic awards include the Heywood Medal in Fine Art and the Guthrie Bond Travelling Scholarship.

== Career ==
Office Workers by Geoffrey Key

Key's early work included an important period of development during which he concentrated on painting and drawing a specific area of the Derbyshire landscape, the Whiteley Nab hill, south of Glossop. Key created hundreds of images of this one landscape. Key later revealed that the purpose of this dedicated period of study was to build upon the firm foundation established by his academic training, whilst divesting himself of the influences he had absorbed in order to arrive at his own personal artistic language.

During this time, Key also worked as an art teacher at Broughton High Secondary School in Salford. Key left this job as his reputation grew and galleries such as Salford Art Gallery, The Rutherston Loan Collection and North West Arts began acquiring his works.

Key was elected to membership of the Manchester Academy of Fine Arts in 1968 and was a prize winner in 1971. During this time, he was also commissioned to produce artwork by three companies in North West England – Mather & Platt, the former Richard Johnson & Nephew company, and the former Wilson's Brewery. The Richard Johnson & Nephew pictures are now held by the Museum of Science and Industry (MOSI) in Manchester. Of the Manchester Academy Exhibition in 1979, Jane Clifford, writing in The Daily Telegraph commented "Perhaps the artist that stands out most is Geoffrey Key" "His female forms show a self-confidence which is compelling".

In the 1980s the French company Société des Caves de Roquefort also commissioned work. Further successful exhibitions were held in both the United Kingdom and abroad. In 1987, the Manchester Evening News asked Key to write an article on L. S. Lowry, who Key had known well, for a feature marking the centenary of the artist's birth. This article was accompanied by a contemporary drawing of Lowry by Key.

In the early 1990s Key visited Hong Kong to exhibit his work in a gallery at the Mandarin Oriental Hotel. Key has stated that this, his first visit to Asia, was to prove a catalyst for a change in the use of colour in his work. An earlier predominance of muted tones was replaced with a fuller and more vibrant palette, which has remained an enduring aspect of his art. Of the exhibition, Asian Art News said "It is the emotion and pleasure of making art that comes through so clearly in Key's work and makes it sparkle".

Pennine Canal by Geoffrey Key

Key's career as an artist now spans five decades and his work and exhibitions have been widely appraised and reviewed. His paintings and sculpture feature in several public art collections in North West England, including Salford and Manchester Art Galleries. His work is also held in private and corporate collections including the National Westminster Bank, Mandarin Oriental Hong Kong, the Hong Kong Jockey Club, the Chateau de St Ouen and Perrier. Key has represented the UK in invited exhibitions in Europe. Shows have taken place across the UK, Europe, Asia, Australia and the USA and his work is exhibited and sold in galleries in the UK, Ireland, the US and Hong Kong.

In May 2013 Key's work was exhibited at Messum's Art Gallery in London. Described as one of the most important living painters, prices for Key's work have risen steadily over the last decade.

Key has also published several books. G Key - A Book of Drawings and Interview (1975), Daydreams (1981), Clowns (2001), Geoffrey Key Twentieth Century Drawings (2002), Images (2004), Geoffrey Key Paintings (2008), Birds (2010). Signature Book (2011).

In 2011 Key was filmed for a documentary about his work and life by Andy Pacino, a filmmaker and author from Manchester. It had the working title Saltglaze Pot.

Speaking with the Manchester Evening News in October 2009 Key said of his style and manner of working "If I'm doing a still life. I'll set it up, look at it for an hour or so, put it away and then paint it. I find the mind's great at distilling, at breaking it down into essentials. If I'm looking at it I find myself copying every detail, and that isn't necessary. I couldn't sit in a field painting a landscape because I would just feel I'm copying nature when photography can do a better job. Painting it from memory, recreating in on canvas can do quite another job".

During 2022 Cheshire Art Gallery held a large retrospective exhibition, featuring 63 important works, with pieces from each decade from 1959 till the present day. There was a book by Nick Brown OBE & a Film to accompany the exhibition.

In 2023 Geoffrey Key's recent successful GOTH exhibition & book launch at Cheshire Art Gallery was only the second time a complete series of his paintings has even been shown.

== Other news coverage ==
- Geoffrey Key an artist of significance, Cheshire Today 2015
- The Figurative Art of Everyday Life by Geoffrey Key, Platform505.com, 10 June 2013
- Key Unlocks the Past, Lancashire Life, October 2009 Edition page 60
- Manchester artist Geoffrey Key shows individuality, Lancashire Life, 28 December 2009
- Light is a key to a great leap forward, Manchester Evening News Edition, Friday October 16, 2009
- Jane Clifford Humour and colour in new-look academy, The Telegraph, February 2, 1979
- Video: Geoffrey Key, Salford's best kept secret, Salfordonline, 25 August 2010
- "Geoffrey Key at Messums | News". Cheshire Today. Archived from the original on 3 March 2016.
- David (27 March 2013). "The art of investment". INCheshire Magazine.

== Bibliography ==
- The Northern School: A Reappraisal, Martin Regan, ISBN 978-1-5272-0320-4
- The Northern School Revisited, Peter Davies, ISBN 978-0-9552591-4-2
- Signature Book, Judith M O'Leary
- 20th Century Drawings, Judith M O'Leary
- Geoffrey Key Paintings, Judith M O'Leary ISBN 978-0955911705
- Infinite Jest, Judith M O'Leary, ISBN 978-0955911767
- Isolated Heads, Nick Brown OBE ISBN 978-1-8382450-0-9
- Goth, Nick Brown OBE
- Key Decades, Cheshire Art Gallery, Nick Brown OBE ISBN 978-1739706005
