= Randolph Caldecott =

British artist and illustrator (1846–1886)

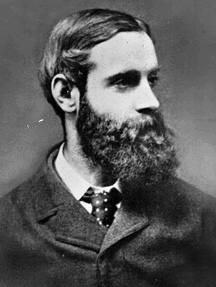
- Randolph Caldecott
- Born: Randolph Caldecott; 22 March 1846; Chester, England
- Died: 12 February 1886 (aged 39); St. Augustine, Florida, U.S.
- Education: Manchester School of Art; Slade School of Fine Art
- Known for: Children's Illustrated Books
- Notable work: The House That Jack Built; The Diverting History of John Gilpin; Three Jovial Huntsmen; A Frog He Would A-Wooing Go

Randolph Caldecott (/ˈkɔːldəkɒt/ KAWL-də-kot; 22 March 1846 – 12 February 1886) was a prolific British artist and illustrator who illustrated novels and accounts of foreign travel, made humorous drawings depicting hunting and fashionable life, drew cartoons, made sketches of the Houses of Parliament inside and out, and exhibited sculptures and paintings in oil and watercolour in the Royal Academy. He is most famous for his illustrations of children's books, for transforming the style of book illustration, and for his continuing influence on illustrators of children's books.

== Early life ==
Caldecott was born at 150 Bridge Street (now No 16), Chester, where his father, John Caldecott, was a tailor-turned-accountant, twice married with thirteen children. Caldecott was his father's third child with his first wife, Mary Dinah Brookes. In 1848, the family moved to Challoner House, Crook Street, Chester, and in 1860 to 23 Richmond Place, Boughton, a village just outside the city.

From early childhood, Caldecott drew and modelled, mostly animals. He occasionally worked in oils, with a favourite subject being his brother Alfred (who would go on to become an eminent philosopher). Randolph spent five years at the King's School, Chester, a grammar school in the city centre, where he was Head Boy. He won a school prize for drawing and, in 1861, had his first drawing published, a sketch of a fire at the Queen Hotel, Chester which appeared in the Illustrated London News, together with his account of the blaze.

Also in 1861, at age 15, Caldecott left school and, at his father's insistence, went to work as a clerk at the offices of the Whitchurch & Ellesmere Bank in Whitchurch, Shropshire. He took lodgings at Wirswall, a village near the town and spent his leisure time sketching the local countryside, fishing, making drawings at shooting meets, markets and cattle fairs. His love of riding led him to take up fox hunting, and his experiences in the hunting field and his love of the chase bore fruit over the years, in a mass of drawings and sketches of hunting scenes, many of them humorous.

== Career ==
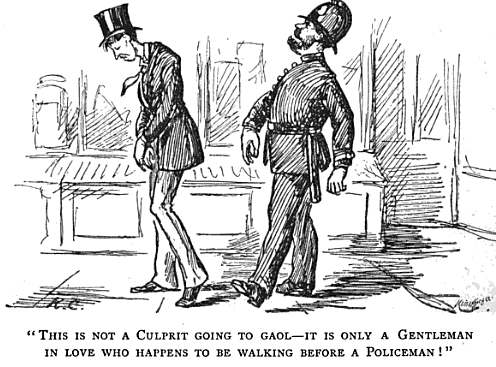
A pen and ink drawing Caldecott had published in a Manchester newspaper

After six years at Whitchurch, Caldecott obtained a position at the head office, in Manchester, of the Manchester & Salford Bank. He lodged variously in Aberdeen Street, Rusholme Grove, and at Bowdon. He enjoyed a steadily-rising income, and was popular with his fellow clerks, with one recalling that he came "like a ray of sunshine into our life, and brightened the drudgery of our toil with his cheerful humour". He drew a lot of caricatures of colleagues and customers and later admitted that he did not show much interest in banking. He studied at night school at the Manchester School of Art, joined the arts-appreciation Brasenose Club, sketched the streets of Manchester, and met with success in local papers including Will o' the Wisp and The Sphinx. In 1869, one of his pictures was hung in the Royal Manchester Institution.

In 1870, a painter friend in London, Thomas Armstrong, put Caldecott in touch with Henry Blackburn, the art editor of the monthly magazine London Society, who published several of his drawings. In 1872, Caldecott quit his job and moved to London to pursue a full-time career in art. He studied at the Slade School of Fine Art and, while still working for London Society, freelanced for Punch, The Illustrated London News, The Pictorial World, and The Graphic. To ensure that his accompanying illustrations would be published, he initially worked as a journalist, and his work included individual sketches, illustrations of articles, and a series of illustrations of a holiday which he and Blackburn took in Germany's Harz Mountains. This resulted in the 1873 book The Harz Mountains: A Tour in the Toy Country.

Caldecott followed The Harz Mountains with illustrations for, among others, two books by Washington Irving (Old Christmas (1876) and Bracebridge Hall (1877)), three for Juliana Ewing (Jackanapes (1883), Daddy Darwin's Dovecot (1884), and Lob Lie-by-the-Fire (1885)) and another Blackburn book, Breton Folk: An Artistic Tour in Brittany (1881).

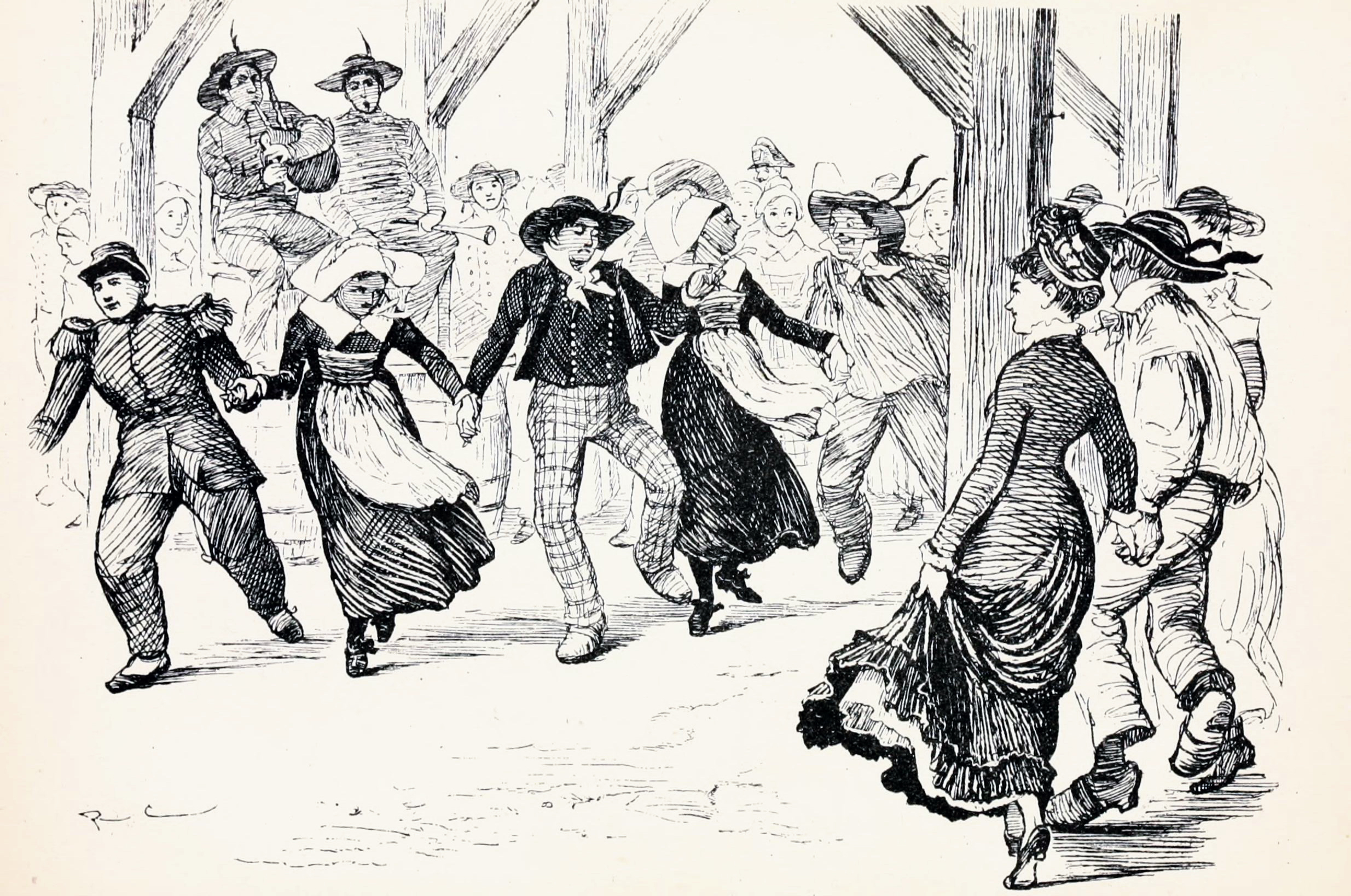
Dancing the Gavotte, Breton Folk, 1880

Breton Folk became a popular book and it was noted by the artists of the Pont-Aven School, who were working to free themselves from the conservatism of their academies. The artist most taken by Caldecott's illustrations was Paul Gauguin, who imitated them in his sketches of Breton girls and worked those sketches into his 1886 painting Four Breton Women. Vincent van Gogh did the same thing, producing Breton Women in 1888. Caldecott's influence is also clear in the works of Beatrix Potter.

Caldecott remained in London for seven years, spending most of them in lodgings at 46 Great Russell Street just opposite the British Museum. He became friends with many artistic and literary people, including Dante Gabriel Rossetti, George du Maurier, John Everett Millais, and Frederic Leighton, who commissioned Caldecott to design peacock capitals for columns in his exotic Kensington home, Leighton House.

In 1873 Blackburn took some of Caldecott's sketches to New York, and his work subsequently appeared in Harper's New Monthly Magazine, Good Housekeeping, and The Daily Graphic. Also in 1973, Caldecott met the expatriate French sculptor Jules Dalou, who taught Caldecott modelling in clay in exchange for English lessons. A Horse Fair at Le Folguet, Brittany is Caldecott's best-known and most commercially successful Bas-relief.

In 1876, Caldecott had a picture exhibited in the Royal Academy for the first time; he went on to exhibit watercolours, oils and sculptures at the academy (he also dabbled in metal relief, terracotta and murals). He also exhibited at the Fine Art Society, the Grosvenor Gallery, and the Dudley Museum and Art Gallery. He was elected to the Manchester Academy of Fine Arts in 1880 and the Royal Institute of Painters in Water Colours in 1882.

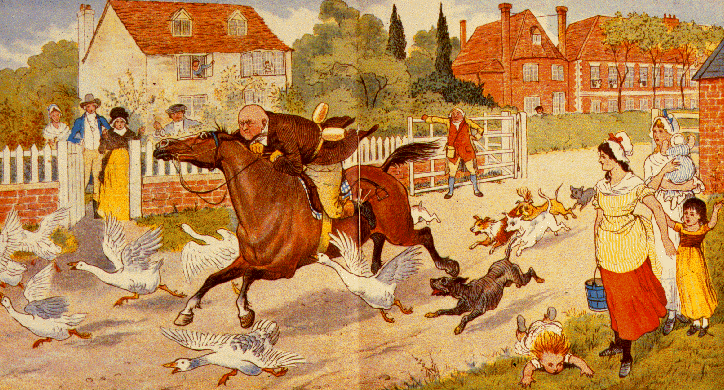
From "The Diverting History of John Gilpin", 1878

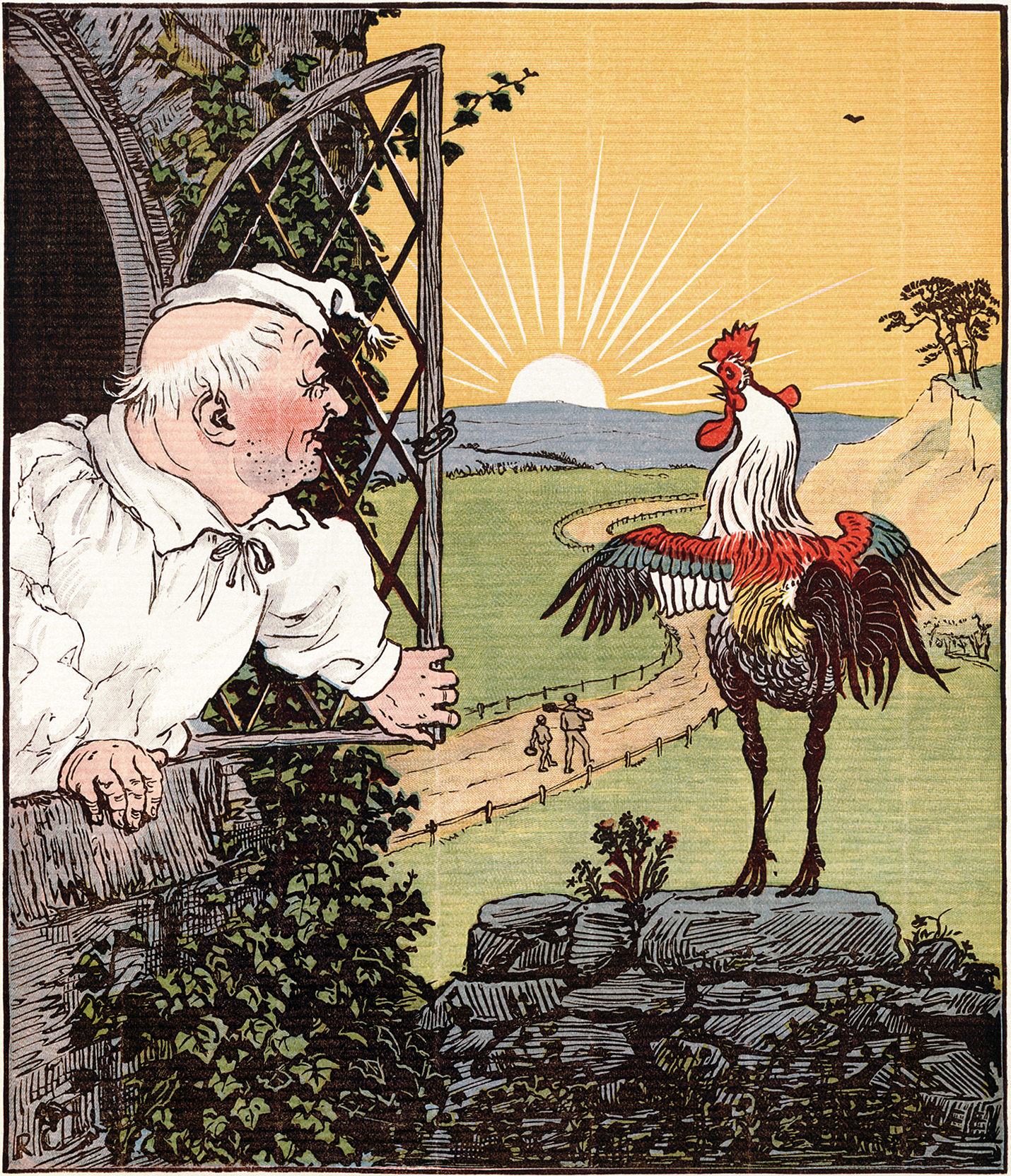
From "This is the House That Jack Built", 1887. (Digitally restored)

Caldecott's style of pen and ink drawing, with thin lines and large white spaces, was particularly suited to printing using wood engraving. In 1877, Edmund Evans, who was a leading colour printer using coloured woodblocks, lost the services of Walter Crane as his children's book illustrator and asked Caldecott for illustrations for two Christmas books. The results were The House that Jack Built and The Diverting History of John Gilpin, published in 1878. Many of Evans’ original printing blocks survive and are held at St Bride Library in London.

Unlike Crane, Caldecott did not illustrate children's stories so much as interpret them. The stories and rhymes were all of his choosing. In some cases, he wrote or re-wrote the text, and he peopled the books with cheeky characters; in the first copy of The House that Jack Built, he included a picture of William Langton, the man who hired him at the Manchester bank. The books were an immediate success; so much so that Caldecott produced two more each year for Evans until he died, for a total of 16 books, all marketed as Christmas presents. Caldecott insisted on receiving a portion of each sale. Initial print runs were limited to 6,000, but the demand was such that sales of Caldecott's Nursery Rhymes shot to 867,000 copies (of twelve books). Caldecott published his own books, and The Graphic published his works in four volumes. By 1884, Caldecott was both rich and internationally famous.

== Personal life and death ==
In 1879, Caldecott moved to Wybournes, a house at Kemsing in Kent. It was there that he became engaged to Marian Brind, who lived at nearby Chelsfield. They were married on 18 March 1880 and lived at Wybournes for the next two years. There were no children of the marriage. In the autumn of 1882, the Caldecotts left Kent and bought a house, Broomfield, at Frensham in Surrey; they also rented No 24 Holland Street, Kensington.

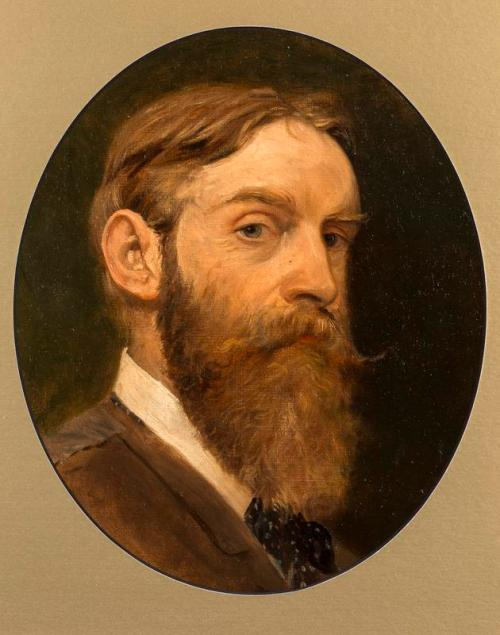
Self-Portrait, Oil on Canvas 1884

Caldecott's health was generally poor and he suffered from gastritis and a heart condition resulting from a childhood case of rheumatic fever. This prompted many winter trips to the Mediterranean and other warm climates. In 1886, he and Marian traveled to Florida where, in an unusually cold February, Randolph became ill and, on February 12, 1886, died at St. Augustine at age 39. A headstone marks his grave in the Evergreen Cemetery in St. Augustine and his gravesite is designated a Literary Landmark.

== Legacy ==
Soon after his death, his many friends contributed to a memorial, which was designed by Sir Alfred Gilbert. It was placed in the crypt of St Paul's Cathedral, London. There is also a memorial to him in Chester Cathedral, placed by the boys of the King's School.

In 1887, Blackburn published the book Randolph Caldecott: A Personal Memoir of His Early Art Career.

In 1938, at the suggestion of Publishers Weekly editor Frederic G. Melcher, the American Library Association instituted the Caldecott Medal. It is awarded annually, by the American Library Association and the Association for Library Service to Children, to the artist of the "most distinguished American picture book for children published during the preceding year".

Caldecott maintained the life-long habit of decorating his letters, papers and documents of all descriptions with marginal sketches to illustrate the content or provide amusement. A number of his letters have been reprinted with their illustrations in the 1976 book Yours Pictorially: Illustrated Letters of Randolph Caldecott.

The Randolph Caldecott Society of America, and the Randolph Caldecott Society UK, remain active.

There is now a memorial plaque at his birthplace on Chester's Bridge Street.

== Appreciation ==
Gleeson White wrote of Caldecott:

Caldecott was a fine literary artist, who was able to express himself with rare facility in pictures in place of words, so that his comments upon a simple text reveal endless subtleties of thought ... You have but to turn to any of his toy-books to see that at times each word, almost each syllable, inspired its own picture ... He studied his subject as no one else ever studied it ... Then he portrayed it simply and with inimitable vigor, with a fine economy of line and colour; when colour is added, it is mainly as a gay convention, and not closely imitative of nature.

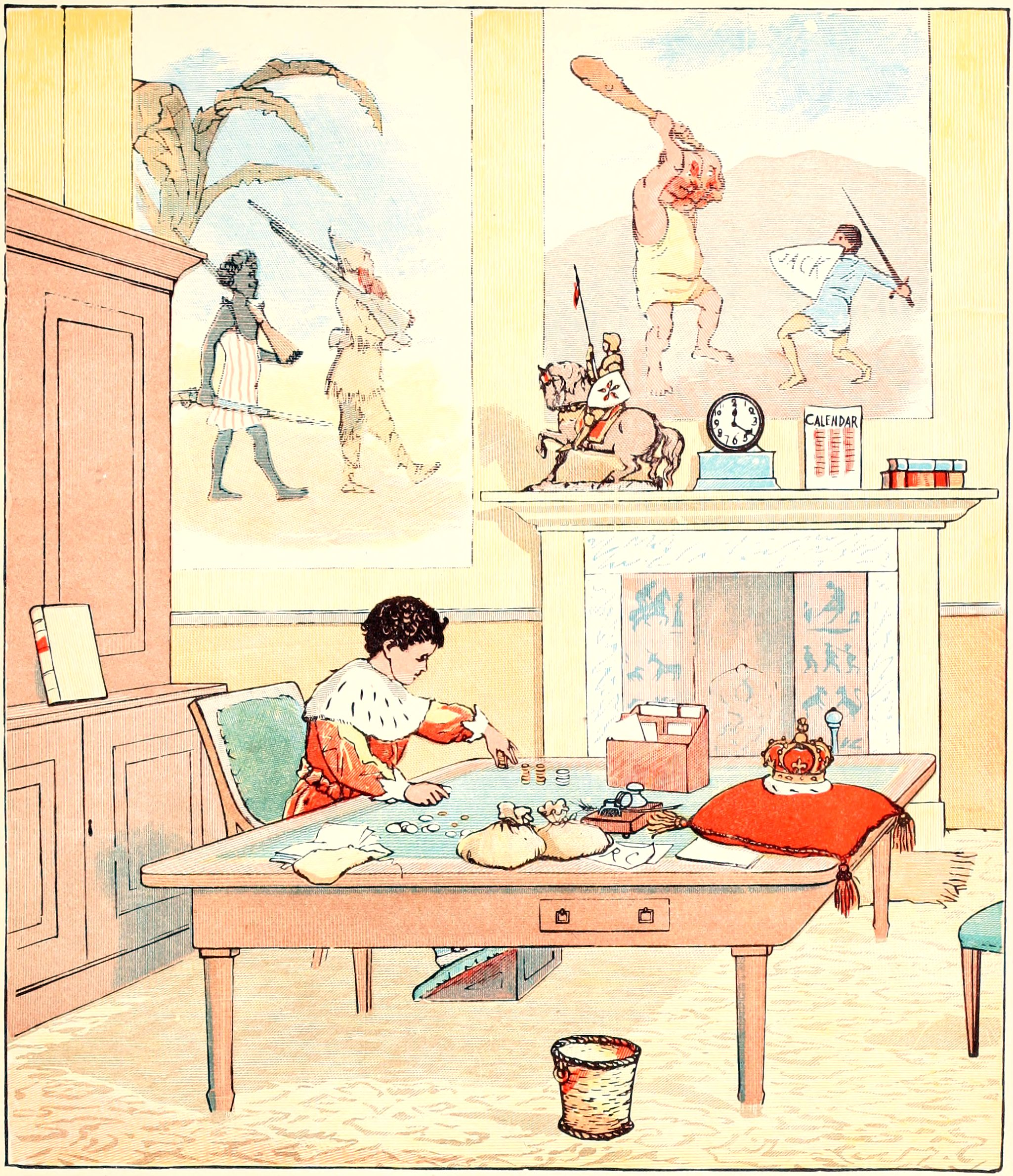
Sing A Song for Sixpence, 1890

G. K. Chesterton wrote in a Caldecott picture book that he presented to a young friend:

This is the sort of book we like
(For you and I are very small),
With pictures stuck in anyhow,
And hardly any words at all.

You will not understand a word
Of all the words, including mine;
Never you trouble; you can see,
And all directness is divine—

Stand up and keep your childishness:
Read all the pedants’ screeds and strictures;
But don’t believe in anything
That can’t be told in coloured pictures.

For Maurice Sendak "Caldecott's work heralds the beginning of the modern picture book. He devised an ingenious juxtaposition of picture and word, a counterpoint that never happened before. Words are left out—but the picture says it. Pictures are left out—but the word says it." Sendak also appreciated the subtle darkness of Caldecott's work: "You can't say it's a tragedy, but something hurts. Like a shadow passing quickly over. It is this which gives a Caldecott book—however frothy the verses and pictures—its unexpected depth."

== Illustrations ==
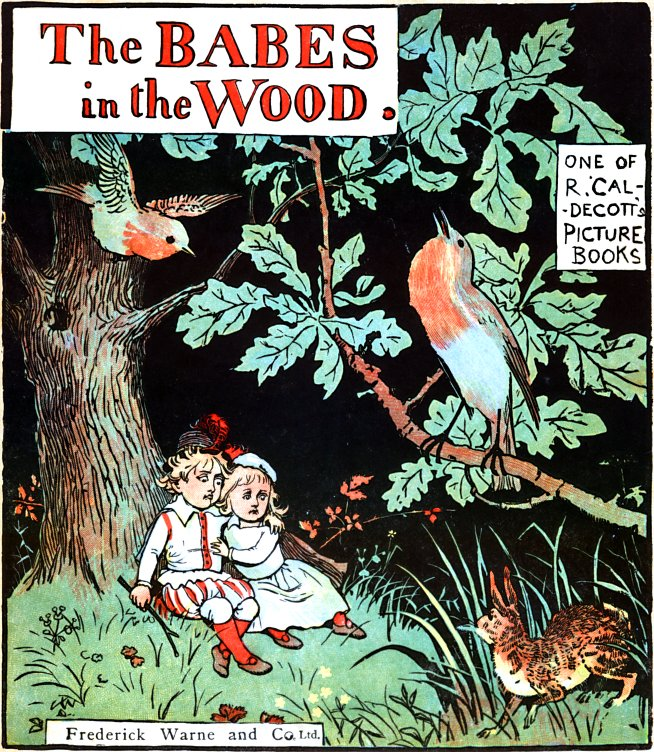
Cover of Babes in the Wood, 1879

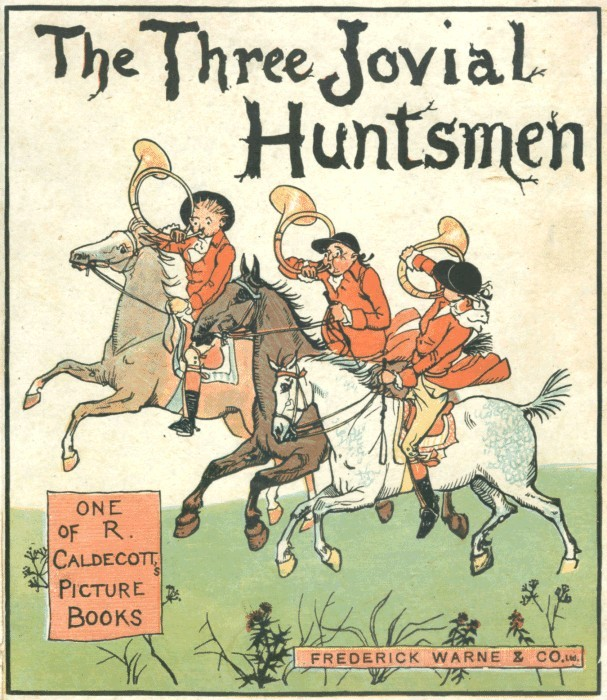
Cover of The Three Jovial Huntsmen, 1881

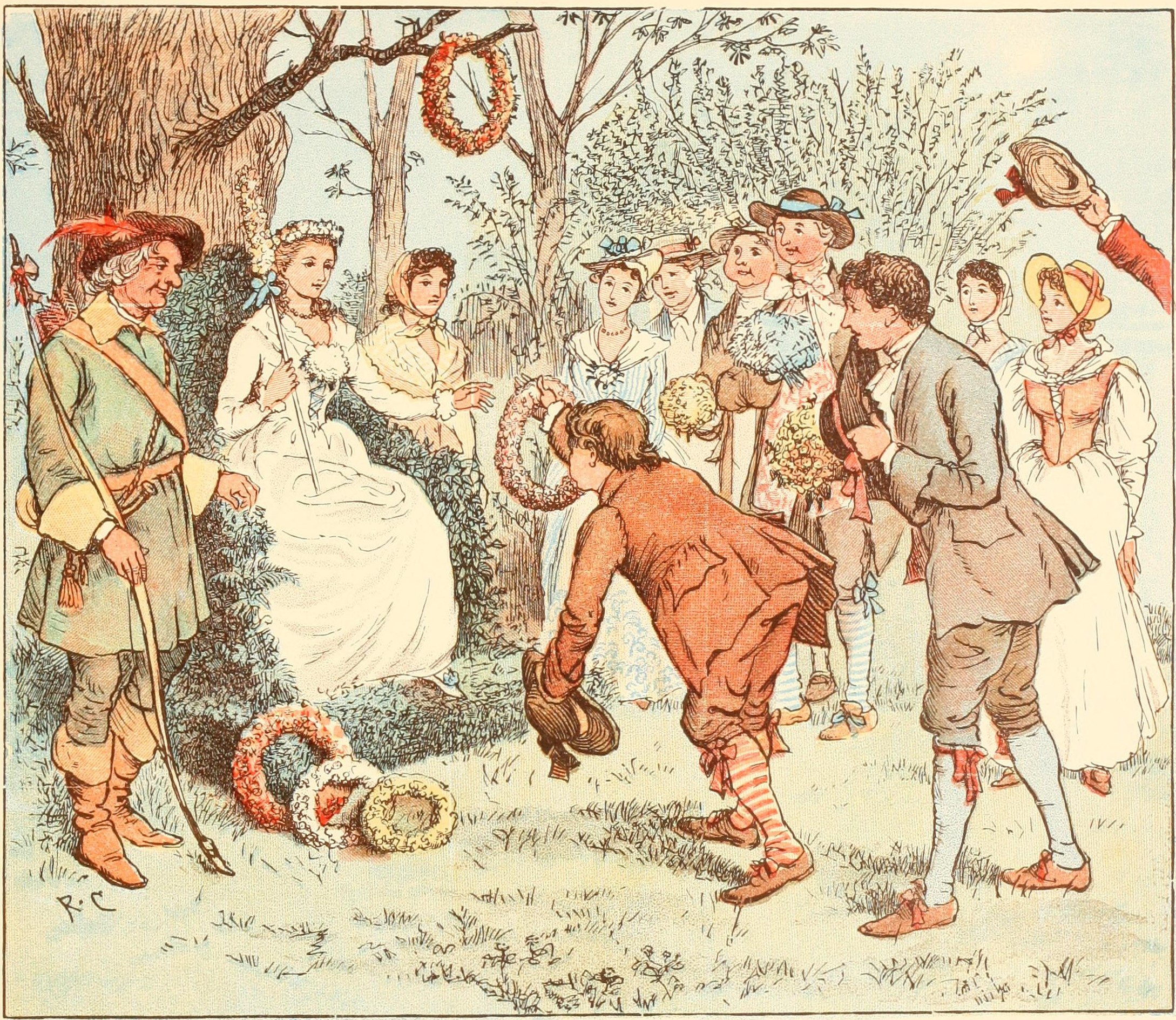
"The lasses held the stakes" – from Come Lasses and Lads, 1884

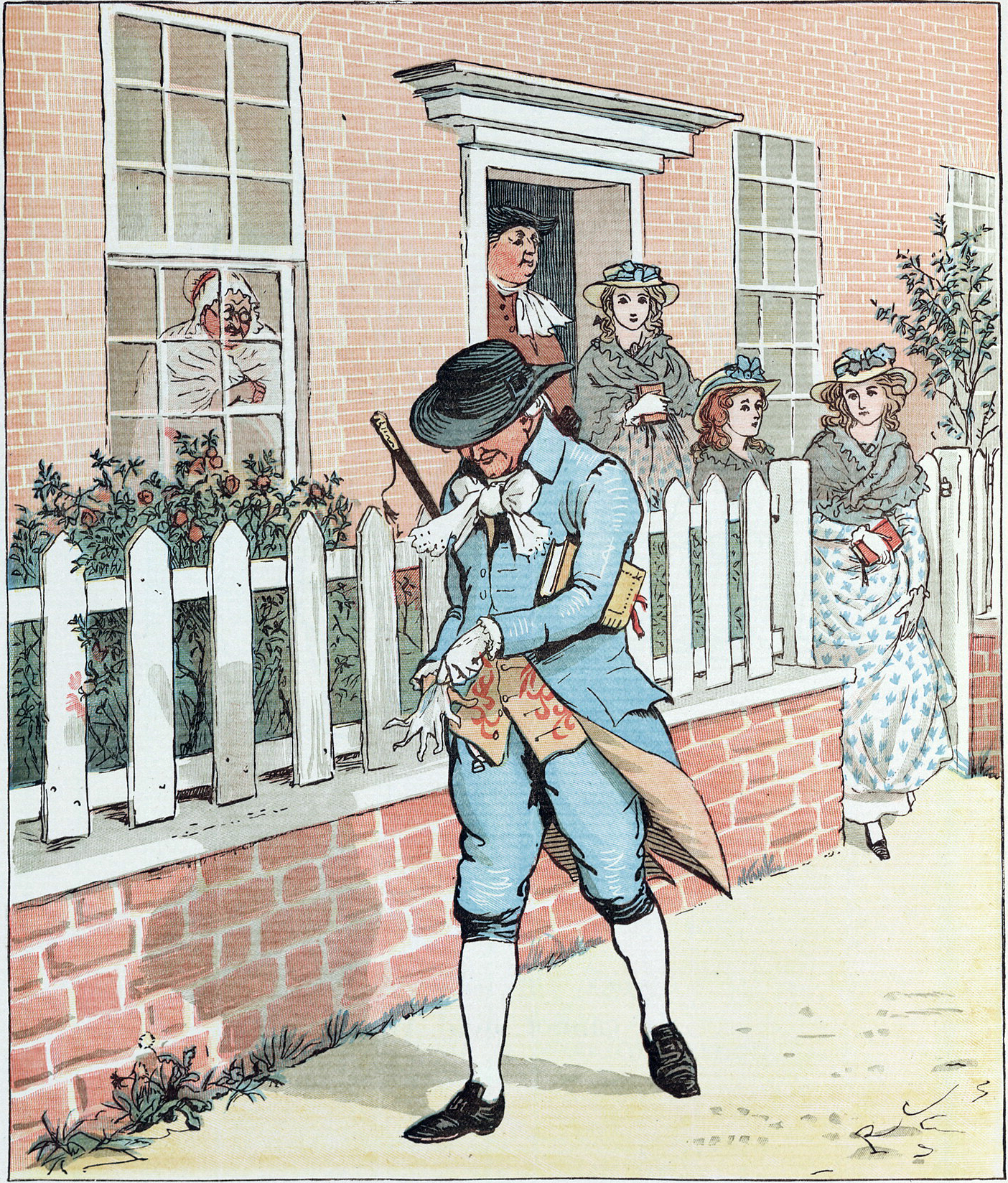
"In Islington there lived a man/Of whom the world might say/That still a godly race he ran" – from Oliver Goldsmith's An Elegy of the Death of a Mad Dog

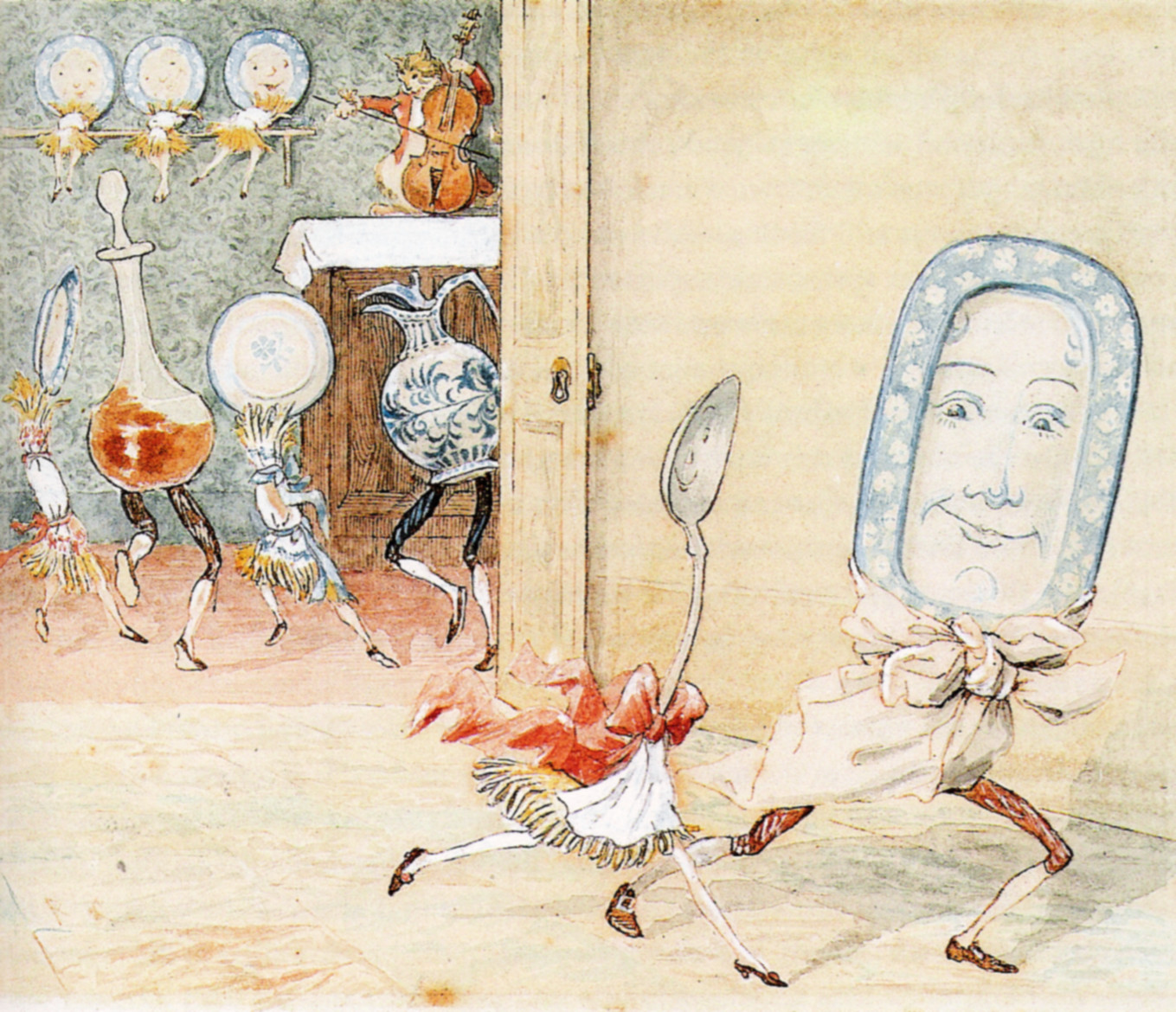
"The dish ran away with the spoon" – this image shows movement characteristic of Caldecott's illustrations

== Paintings ==
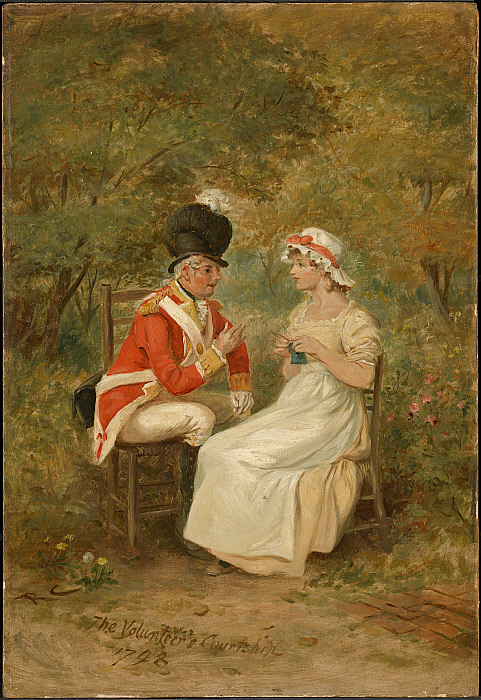
The Volunteer's Courtship, 1798 (1870), oil on paper or wood-pulp board, Clark Art Institute

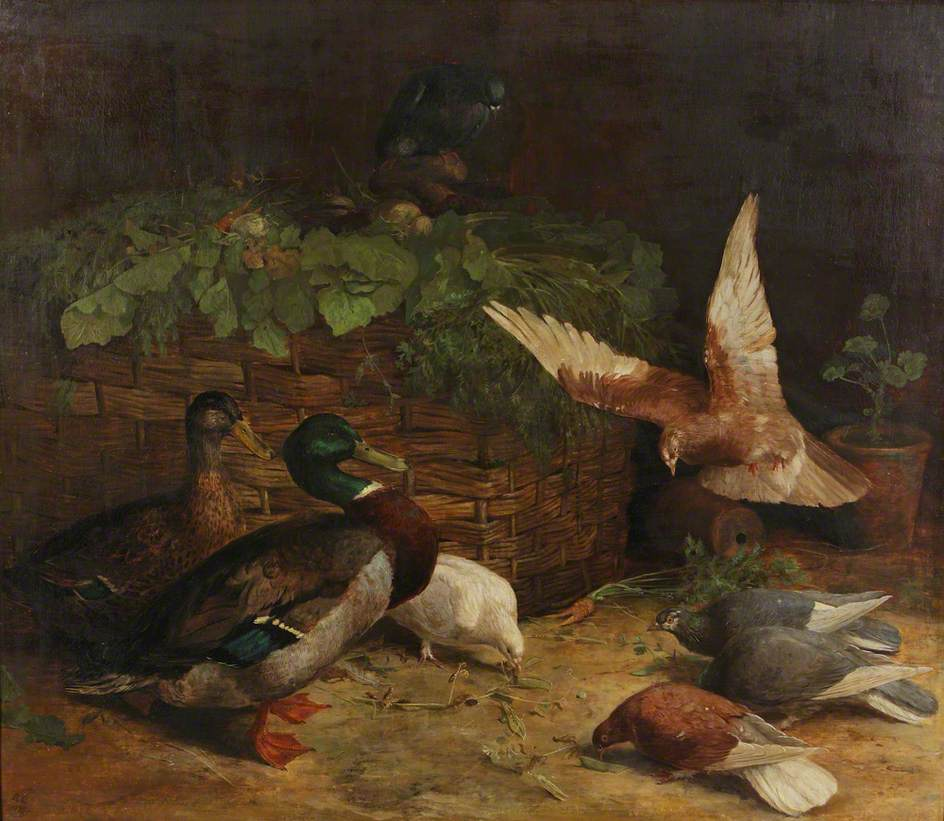
Mallards and Pigeons (1876), oil on canvas, Ludlow Library

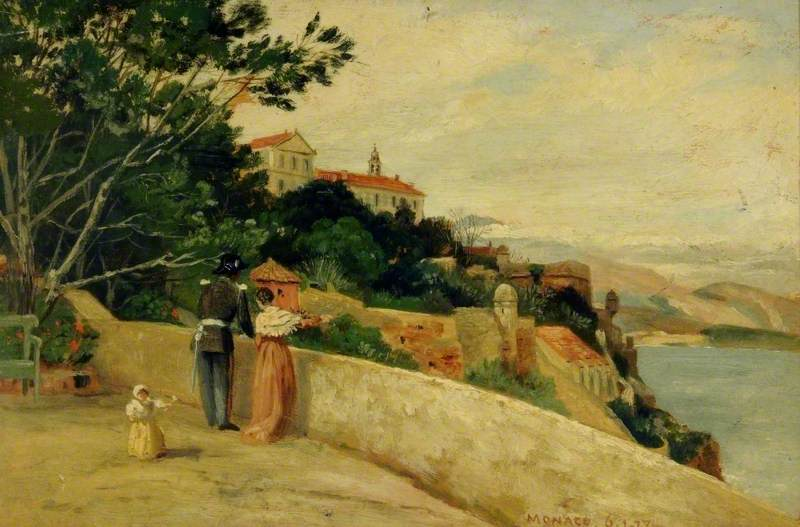
Monaco (1877), oil on panel, Sheffield Museums Trust

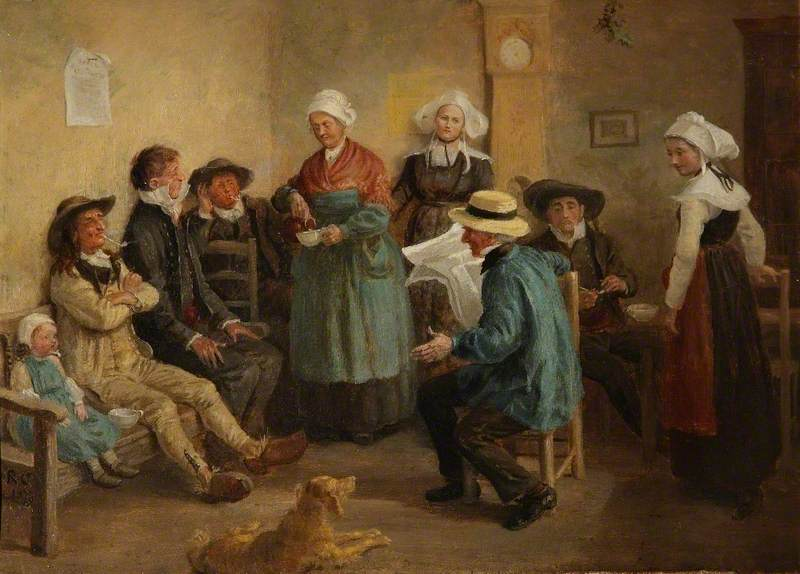
A Tavern Scene in Finistère, Brittany (1878), oil on canvas, Ludlow Library

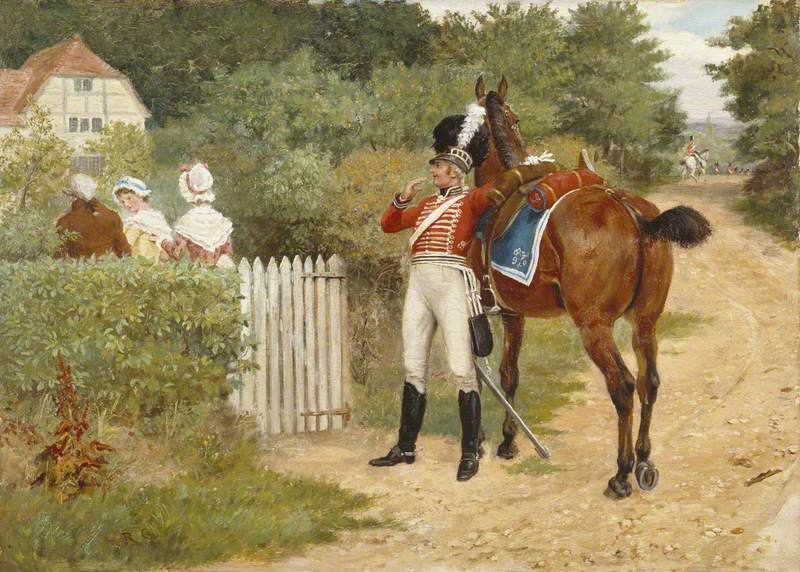
The Girl I Left Behind Me (1886), oil on canvas, Manchester Art Gallery

== Bibliography ==
- The Harz Mountains: A Tour in the Toy Country (1873, with Henry Blackburn)
- The House That Jack Built (1878)
- The Diverting History of John Gilpin (1878)
- The Mad Dog (1879)
- The Babes in the Wood (1879)
- The Three Jovial Huntsmen (1880)
- Sing a Song of Sixpence (1880)
- Breton Folk: An Artistic Tour in Brittany (1881, with Henry Blackburn)
- The Farmer's Boy (1881)
- The Queen of Hearts (1881)
- The Milkmaid (1882)
- Hey-Diddle-Diddle and Baby Bunting (1882)
- A Frog He Would A-Wooing Go (1883)
- The Fox Jumps Over the Parson's Gate (1883)
- Randolph Caldecott's Graphic Pictures (1883)
- Come Lasses and Lads (1884)
- Ride A-Cock Horse to Branbury Cross & A Farmer Went Trotting Upon His Grey Mare (1884)
- Mrs. Mary Blaize: An Elegy on the Glory of Her Sex (1885)
- The Great Panjandrum Himself (1885)
- Washington Irving's Old Christmas and Bracebridge Hall (1886)
- Complete Collection of Pictures and Songs (1887) From the Collections at the Library of Congress
- Some of Aesop's Fables with Modern Instances Shewn (1887)
- Last Graphic Pictures (1888)
- Randolph Caldecott's Sketches (1890)
