= James Astbury Hammersley =

British painter (1818–1867)

- Born: 1818; Burslem, Staffordshire, England
- Died: 11 March 1867 (aged 48–49); Manchester, Lancashire, England
- Known for: Landscapes
- Patrons: Albert, Prince Consort

James Astbury Hammersley (1818–1867) was an English painter, and a teacher of art and design.

== Life ==
Hammersley was born at Burslem, Staffordshire in 1818.

He studied art under James Baker Pyne. During the 1840s he taught at the Nottingham School of Design, where his pupils included Henry Hunter and Andrew MacCallum.

From May 1849 until 31 December 1862 Hammersley was head-master of the Manchester School of Design. He took part in the formation of the Manchester Academy of Fine Arts, being elected its first president, 28 May 1857. He resigned the post on 30 December 1861.

Hammersley died on 11 March 1867 in Manchester, and was buried at St. John's Church, Higher Broughton.

The Dictionary of National Biography incorrectly claims that he was born in 1815 and died in 1869.

== Works ==
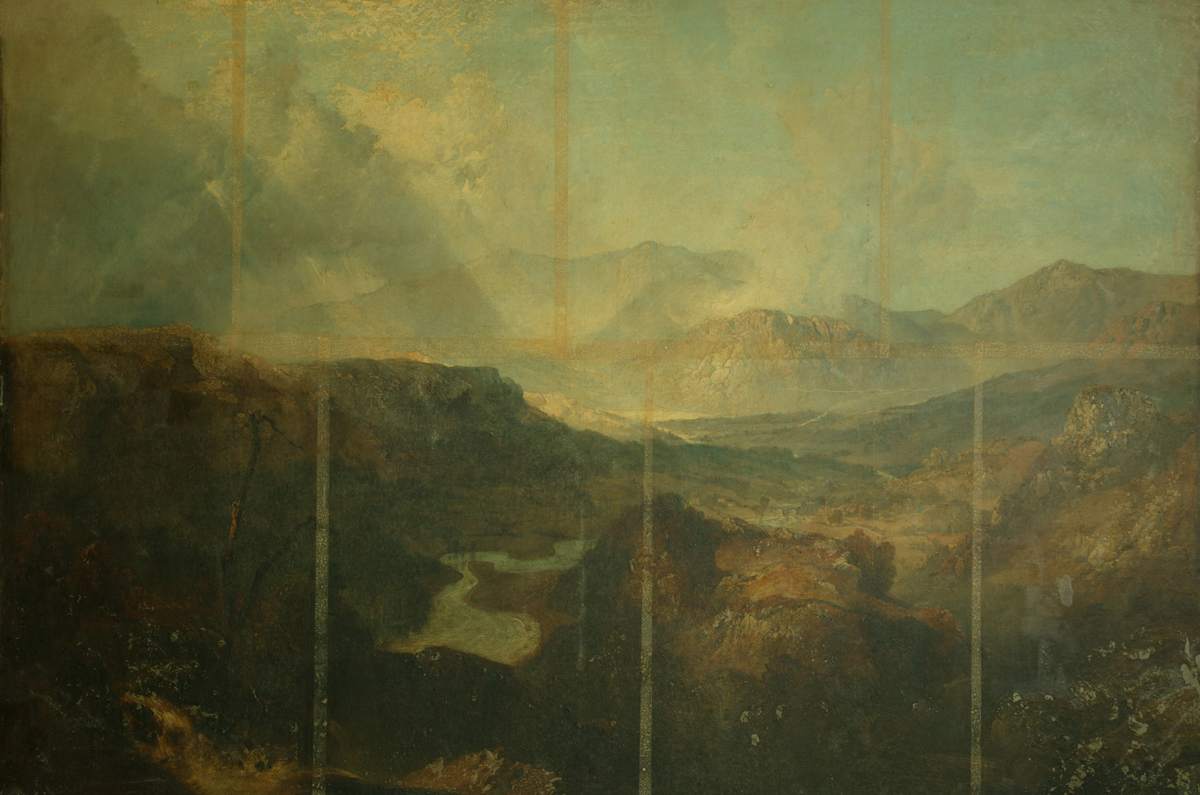
Mountains and Clouds – A Scene from the Top of Loughrigg, Westmoreland, a large landscape now in the Manchester City Galleries collection, was exhibited at the autumn exhibition of 1850, and was presented by Hammersley to the Royal Manchester Institution.

Hammersley received a commission, from Albert, Prince Consort, to paint the prince's birthplace, Schloss Rosenau, Coburg, and another scene in Germany. These works are now in the Royal Collection at Windsor Castle.

In 1850 Hammersley delivered an address at Nottingham on the Preparations on the Continent for the Great Exhibition of 1851, and the Condition of the Continental Schools of Art; it was published. An article by him appeared in Manchester Papers, 1856, entitled "Exhibition of Art Treasures of the United Kingdom", anticipating the Manchester exhibition.

In 1845, Mrs Charles Darwin noted in her diary "send the X head to Mr J.A. Hammersley.

Professional and academic associations
Preceded by Creation	President of the Manchester Academy of Fine Arts; 1859–62	Succeeded by John Lamont Brodie
