= Käthe Schuftan =

German painter

- Born: Käthe Fanny Schuftan; 12 January 1899; Breslau, German Empire
- Died: 21 February 1958 (aged 59); Manchester, England, United Kingdom
- Movement: Expressionism, new objectivity

Käthe Fanny Schuftan (12 January 1899 – 21 February 1958) was a German Jewish artist whose paintings and drawings expressed both human suffering and the aspiration of spirit, in the mid 20th century. Josef Paul Hodin wrote that she "worked in an Expressionist style reminiscent of Käthe Kollwitz' social pathos". An artist at the time of the Weimar culture, she was tortured and imprisoned by the Nazis in the early 1930s, and her work was destroyed. She escaped in 1939, arriving in Manchester, England, not long before the outbreak of World War II; she lived and worked there until her death in 1958.

== Breslau ==
Käthe Fanny Schuftan was born on 12 January 1899 in Breslau, German Empire (now Wrocław, Poland). Her father was the chemist Dr. Georg Schuftan, her mother Else née Mugdan. The chemist Paul Schuftan was her older brother. Käthe Schuftan studied at the art academy in Breslau and in Munich; one of her teachers was the graphic designer Hans Leistikow. She then worked in Breslau and became a close friend of Ernst Eckstein, one of the leading figures in the Socialist Workers' Party of Germany, SAP, who apparently committed suicide after his arrest by the Nazis in May 1933. Schuftan subsequently moved to Berlin.

== Berlin ==
In Berlin, Käthe Schuftan and her younger sister Lotte were involved in underground activities of the SAP. In November 1933, she was detained and tortured by the SA at the former Volkshaus (People's House) in Berlin-Charlottenburg, and all the pictures in her flat were destroyed. In proceedings against 24 SAP members in late 1934, the Volksgerichtshof sentenced her to two years in prison (minus the time she had been on remand) for planning high treason, i.e. an overthrow of the government by violence. In 1937, Margot Riess described Käthe's works as expressing a "primarily tragic, accusing attitude towards the world, with all its stark misery, agony and hardship". In December 1933, some of her works had been included in a Breslau exhibition of what the Nazis considered "Degenerate art"; three of her watercolours and a drawing were confiscated from Breslau museums in September 1937. She left Berlin shortly before the outbreak of World War II.

== Manchester ==
Schuftan arrived in Manchester, England in June 1939. During the war years she worked in a munitions factory. Her obituary stated that after the war she earned her living at commercial art. She had two one-person shows of her work and exhibited in group exhibitions in Manchester. Schuftan befriended the young John Milne who later went on to work as an assistant to Barbara Hepworth before making his own career. Her work was selected for the annual exhibition of the Manchester Academy of Fine Arts three times between 1940 and 1942. She exhibited with the Manchester Group, which included L. S. Lowry, Emmanuel Levy, Jose Christopherson (a member of the Society of Women Artists) and Emmeline Boulton at the Mid-Day Studios and other galleries. Schuftan died on 21 February 1958, sadly only a short time after the German government awarded her financial compensation for her suffering under the Nazis. A retrospective exhibition of her work was held at the Salford Museum and Art Gallery in June 1958. Her obituary in The Manchester Guardian was written by Margo Ingham, founder of the Mid-Day Studios, the Manchester Group and the Manchester Arts Club.

=== Exhibitions ===
- 1929: A small exhibition in Breslau, of drawings and watercolours by Käthe Schuftan.
- 1940: The Manchester Academy of Fine Arts, Spring Exhibition which included two portraits by Schuftan. Other artists included Bertram Nicolls, Karl Hagdorn, Mr. Cundall, Wilfrid Wood, Mr. Simmons, Arnold Taylor, Sylvia Bergin, Evelyn Harris, K.J.H. Craddock, R. Tunnicliffe, Eva Noar, Marion Broadhead, John E. Brown, Ida Percy.
- 1941:The Manchester Academy of Fine Arts, Spring Exhibition which included two works by Schuftan.
- 1942:The Manchester Academy of Fine Arts, Spring Exhibition which included portraits by Schuftan and Eugene Halliday.
- 1943: The Manchester Ballet Club, exhibition for the benefit of "Mrs. Churchill's Aid to Russian Fund", which included a watercolour by Schuftan and a scraperboard by her friend Eugene Halliday. Other artists included John Bold, John Bowes, Janet Kirk, Ruth M. Marshall, W.J. Colclough, Ian Grant, Joan Werschy and Maurice Crane.
- 1945: The Manchester Ballet Club, exhibition entitled "Seven Painters", including a portrait by Käthe Schuftan. Other artists included Margo Ingham, John Bold, Theodore Major, John Bowes, Ned Owens, and W.J. Colclough.
- 1946: The Manchester Ballet Club, including "Mother with Dead Child" by Schuftan. Other artists included Ian Grant, Harold Hemingway, John Bowes, Richard Weisbrod, Rodger Sumner, John Bold, E.G. Cowap and Bernard O'Connell.
- 1947: Gibb's Bookshop, Manchester, exhibition which included works by Schuftan and Eugene Halliday. Other artists included Jose Christopherson, N.G. Hopwood, J. Gordon Smith.
- 1948: The Mid-Day Studios, exhibition entitled "Pub Scenes", which included a painting by Schuftan described as a study of a bar-room type. Other artists included Kathleen Herring, Ronald Allan, John Crank, Margaret Wilson, H.P. Griffiths, K. Greenhalgh and Aleksander Ferworn.
- 1951: Whitethorn Cottage, Prestbury, Cheshire, one-person exhibition of watercolours by Schuftan.
- 1955: Gibb's Bookshop, Manchester, one-person exhibition of work by Schuftan.
- 1958: Salford Museum and Art Gallery, retrospective one-person exhibition of work by Schuftan following her death on 21 February 1958.
