= Broughton High School =

Broughton High School is a name shared by a number of schools:

- Broughton High School, Salford, Greater Manchester, England
- Broughton High School, Lancashire, England
- Broughton High School, Edinburgh, Midlothian, Scotland
- Broughton Hall High School, Liverpool, Merseyside, England
- Needham B. Broughton High School, Raleigh, North Carolina, USA
