= Roger Hampson =

British artist

- Born: 1925; Tyldesley, Lancashire, England
- Died: 1996 (aged 70–71); Tyldesley, Lancashire, England
- Education: Manchester School of Art
- Known for: Print-making

Roger Hampson (1925–1996) was born in Tyldesley, Lancashire, England. He was a teacher, painter and printmaker, taking inspiration from everyday surroundings, people and the industries prevalent in the area where he lived and worked.

== Background ==
Roger Hampson was born in Union Street, Tyldesley, and moved to Johnson Street when he was three. He attended Leigh Grammar School and served in the Royal Navy during World War II. After the war he attended Manchester School of Art before becoming a teacher.

== Career ==
He spent a short time in Hereford before returning to Manchester where he worked as a graphic designer and began to exhibit paintings as part of a group of post-war artists who developed the realist tradition established by L S Lowry and Harry Rutherford.

He spent most of his life in Tyldesley, an industrial town surrounded by collieries and dominated by Caleb Wright's Barnfield Mills. He moved to the cotton town of Bolton where he became head of Bolton College of Art.

Professional and academic associations
| Preceded by Harry Rutherford | President of the Manchester Academy of Fine Arts; 1969–78 | Succeeded by Keith Godwin |
