= Henry Clarence Whaite =

English artist (1828–1912)

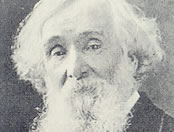
- Born: 1828; Manchester, England
- Died: 1912 (aged 83–84); Conwy Valley, Wales
- Education: Manchester School of Design
- Known for: landscapes

Henry Clarence Whaite often referred to as Clarence Whaite (1828–1912) was an English artist best known for his landscape paintings of Wales. Having spent the earlier part of career based in his native Manchester, he later settled near Conwy in North Wales. He was an early member of the Manchester Academy of Fine Arts, and a leading figure in the formation of the Royal Cambrian Academy of Art.

== Life ==
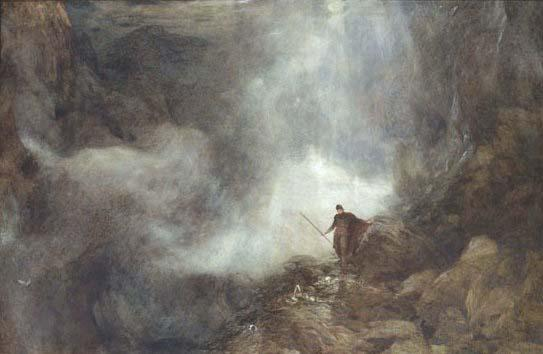
Arthur in the Gruesome Glen

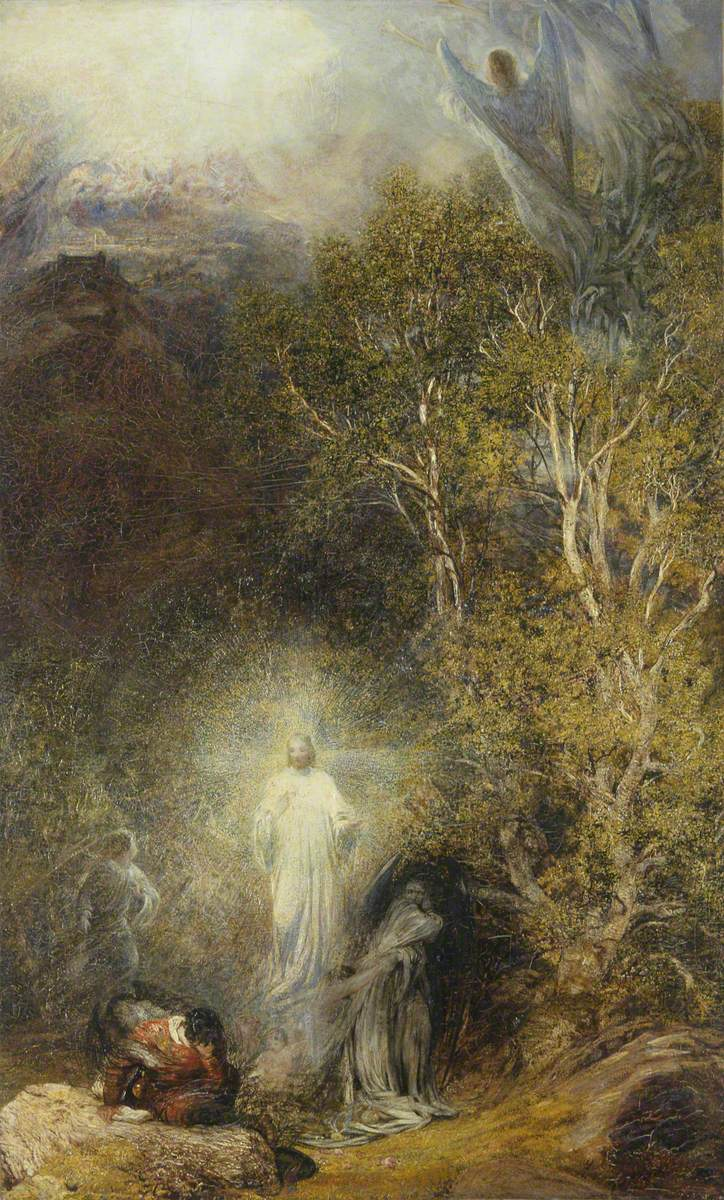
The Awakening of Christian

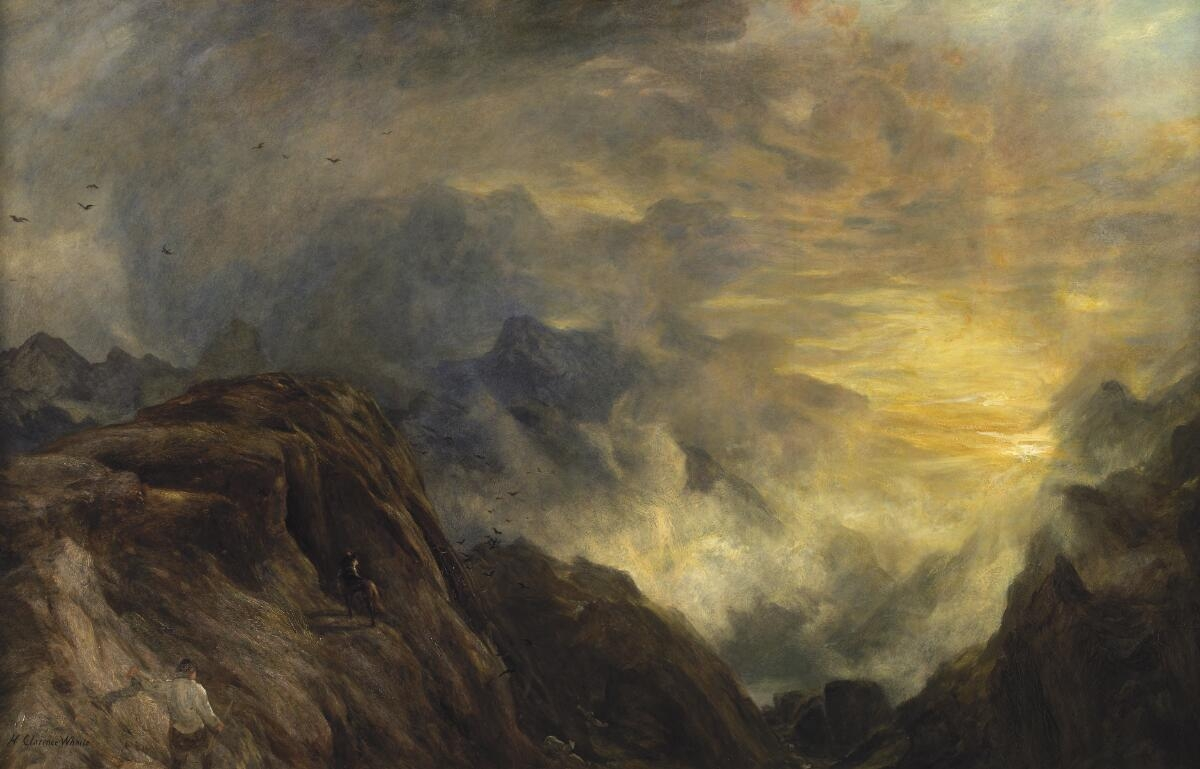
Mountain mist, sun rise

Whaite was born in Manchester in 1828. His father, Henry, owned an art gallery and picture framing business, which also supplied painted banners for rallies and meetings. Whaite was educated at Manchester Grammar School before matriculating to the Manchester School of Design. He later moved to London to complete his education, studying at Leigh's School in Newman Street and at the Royal Academy in Somerset House. He visited Switzerland in 1850, and inspired by the mountain scenery planned to return the following year, but this proved impracticable.

Unable to return to Switzerland, he looked for mountain scenery nearer home, and in 1851 made his first visit to Betws-y-Coed, a village in the Conwy Valley in North Wales which had already become a favourite destination for artists. The landscape of the area was to become the main subject of his work for the rest of his life. For the next twenty years, however, he remained based in Manchester, living in Stretford and becoming a member of the newly established Manchester Academy of Fine Arts in 1859. Then, in 1870, he took a house called Tyddyn Cynal on the river about 3 miles from Conwy, which became his permanent residence. In 1876 he married a local woman, Jane Alice Griffiths. They had one daughter, Lily Florence Whaite, who also became a notable artist.

In 1881 Whaite led a group of English and Welsh artists in forming the Cambrian Academy of Art, later the Royal Cambrian Academy of Art, the first art Academy in Wales. He later became the President of the Cambrian Academy and in 1892 became president of the Manchester Academy, a post he held until his death. A bronze of Whaite by Irish artist John Cassidy was commissioned and completed in 1898.

He died in 1912 and was buried at Llangelynnin New Church.

== Work ==
Whaite displayed a vibrant style in his watercolours, and was noted for his ability to capture changing weather conditions in his landscapes, which often evoked a religious wonder. His religious beliefs were a strong influence on his work, and although his faith emerged in his work through an attached moral significance to the landscape, he also painted explicitly Christian themes as in The Awakening of Christian (c. 1885) and Arthur in the Gruesome Glen.

He exhibited at the Royal Academy from 1851. In 1859 his paintings were reviewed by John Ruskin in his Academy Notes. Although generally positive, Ruskin warned of the dangers of Whaite's excessively minute technique. Discussing his Barley Harvest, the critic wrote:

Very exquisite in nearly every respect; perhaps, take it all in all the most covetable bit of landscape this year, and showing good promise, it seems to me, if the painter does not overwork himself needlessly. The execution of the whole by minute and similar touches is a mistake.

When all of Whaite's submissions to the Academy's exhibition of 1865 were rejected, he took them to Ruskin, who provided detailed criticism, illustrating his remarks on their shortcomings with reference to sketches and drawings by J. M. W. Turner.

His oil paintings often used spots of pure colour, a consequence of his interest in colour theory, which may have pre-empted the pointillism strand of Impressionism that developed elsewhere in Europe.

== Sources ==
- Lord, Peter (1998). The Betws-y-Coed Artists' Colony 1844–1912. Aberystwyth: National Library of Wales. ISBN 1-86225-008-1.

Professional and academic associations
Preceded by Elias Mollineaux Bancroft	President of the Manchester Academy of Fine Arts; 1892–1915	Succeeded by John Ely
