= The Great Panjandrum Himself =

Picture book by Randolph Caldecott

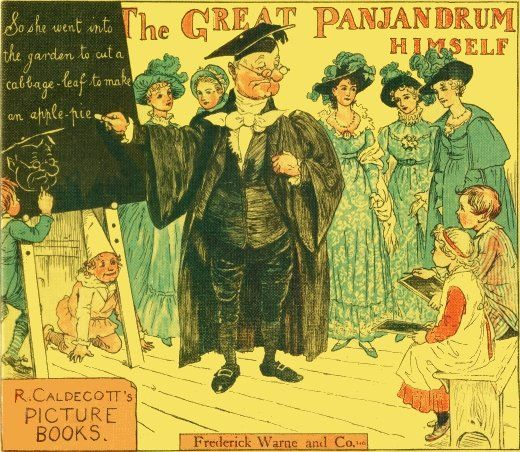
The cover of The Great Panjandrum Himself

The Great Panjandrum Himself is one of sixteen picture books created by the illustrator Randolph Caldecott. The book was published in 1885 by Frederick Warne & Co. It was the last book illustrated by Caldecott, who died the following year.

The text for the book, well known during Caldecott's time, was written and published in 1775 by Samuel Foote. It is based on a piece of nonsense written by Foote ("And there were present the Picninnies, and the Joblillies, and the Garyulies and the Grand Panjandrum himself, with the little round button at the top."), written to test the memory of the actor Charles Macklin, who had claimed he could repeat any text verbatim after hearing it once.

The term "panjandrum" has since become used to describe a powerful person or a self-important official. The word is used in the 1909 song "I've Got Rings On My Fingers", which reads "...they named him Chief Pan Jan Drum, Nabob of them all".

During World War II, author and engineer Nevil Shute of the British military helped design an experimental rocket-propelled weapon which he named the Panjandrum.

A character named Panjandrum appears as a deus ex machina in the Thursday Next series, set in a fictional world created by the Panjandrum.

== Text ==
In 1885, Randolph Caldecott altered the formatting of the piece so that it read as verse and published it as a picture book. The text is as follows:

So she went into the garden
to cut a cabbage-leaf
to make an apple-pie;
and at the same time
a great she-bear, coming down the street,
pops its head into the shop.
What! no soap?
So he died,
and she very imprudently married the Barber:
and there were present
the Picninnies,
and the Joblillies,
and the Garyulies,
and the great Panjandrum himself,
with the little round button at top;
and they all fell to playing the game of catch-as-catch-can,
till the gunpowder ran out at the heels of their boots.
