= The Hay Field =

Painting by Thomas Armstrong

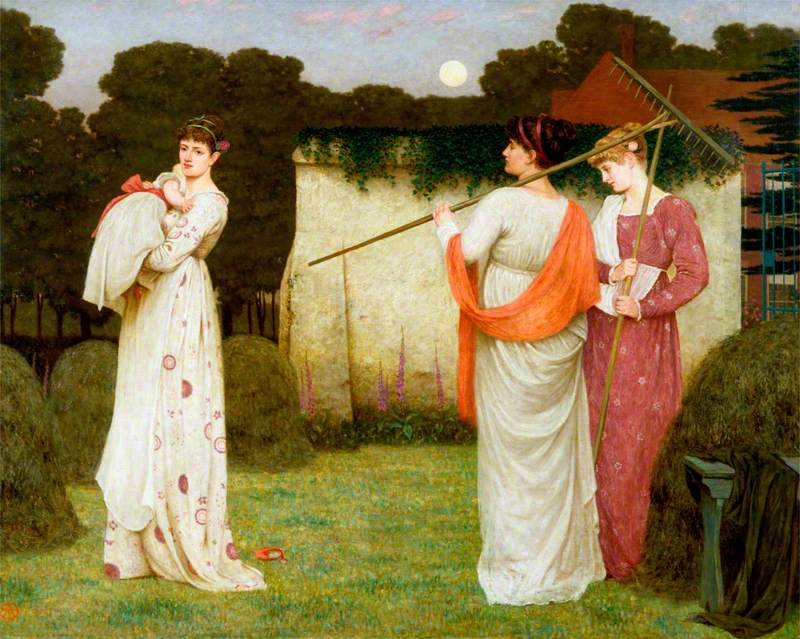
- Artist: Thomas Armstrong
- Year: 1869
- Type: Oil on canvas, genre painting
- Dimensions: 113.7 cm × 157.2 cm (44.8 in × 61.9 in)
- Location: Victoria and Albert Museum, London

The Hay Field is an 1869 genre painting by the British artist Thomas Armstrong. Armstrong had studied in Paris under Ary Scheffer. Initially associated with the realist movement, this work reflects the influence of the Aesthetic Movement on his style. The three poised haymakers reflect a romanticised view of the rural ideal and may make referee to the Three Graces.

The painting was displayed at the Royal Academy Exhibition of 1869 at Burlington House in Piccadilly. Today it is in the collection of the Victoria and Albert Museum in South Kensington, having come into its possession in a 1917 bequest.

== Bibliography ==
- Roe, Sonia. Oil Paintings in Public Ownership in the Victoria and Albert Museum. Public Catalogue Foundation, 2008.
- Wahl, Kimberly. Dressed as in a Painting: Women and British Aestheticism in an Age of Reform. University of New Hampshire Press, 2013.
