= Eugene Halliday =

British artist, writer, and teacher

- Born: Eugene Halliday; 10 December 1911; Manchester, England
- Died: 22 July 1987 (aged 75); Manchester, England
- Education: Manchester School of Art
- Known for: Hermeneutics, Art, Religion, Philosophy, Psychology

Eugene Halliday (10 December 1911 – 22 July 1987) was a British artist, writer, and teacher. For a large part of his life he lived and taught in Manchester and Altrincham, England, lecturing (in Manchester and Liverpool), running groups and giving personal tuition to a large number of interested people. He was an artist, a writer of books, plays and poetry as well as possessing understandings of philosophy, religion and the science of his day. Much of his work centred on his interpretation of the esoteric ideas behind religion. He practised and taught an approach to psychotherapy. He was a friend of the artist Käthe Schuftan, giving the tribute at her funeral in 1958.

== Teachings ==
Halliday gave the term "absolute sentient power" to what we would call God and said that sentience and thus consciousness was an inherent quality of this power and by extension of all substances and created beings. Beings, including ourselves are modalities of this power which we feel as a field of energy, from which and through which we are informed about ourselves and the world. The goal and purpose of life is to grow towards an awareness of our true nature which is not different from this field and the absolute sentient power itself. This consciousness he called "reflexive self-consciousness" (resec for short). The force which calls and drives beings to work towards resec is Love – which he defined as "a will to work for the development of the potentialities of all beings." According to his own understanding he valued individuality and encouraged others to discover their own valid way to reveal reflexivity to themselves.

== International Hermeneutic Society (IHS) ==
The IHS was founded by Eugene Halliday and Khen Ratcliffe. It is a study and meditation centre (in Tan y Garth Hall) dedicated to the teachings of Eugene Halliday. Under the guidance of its tutors, Tan y Garth Hall offers the opportunity for students and teachers from all denominations and walks of life to come together and study the hermeneutic techniques and principles of Yoga both East and West. Eugene Halliday's books and talks are available from the IHS at Tan y Garth Hall.

=== What Is Hermeneutics? ===
Hermeneutics is the art of interpretation; the theory of the discovery and communication of the concepts and teachings of the scriptures of the world; the science of attaining clarity, by comprehending, explaining and establishing the sense of both traditional and biblical authors. It looks to the individual's own apprehension rather than the conveyance of the meaning ascertained to others, thereby enabling individuals to interpret for themselves in the light of their own experience.

== Institute for the Study of Hierological Values (ISHVAL) ==
Eugene Halliday's work was wide-ranging in scope, and he brought together into a coherent whole concepts from hierology (sacred texts), art, religion, philosophy, psychology and science. From his insight into human thought and motivation, he stated that no school of thought has access to the only truth about reality, that no one religion possesses the only true path to the divine. "Each great philosopher has been a doorway for a part of Truth". In 1966 Eugene Halliday founded the Charity ISHVAL, together with the Liverpool businessman and philanthropist Fred Freeman and his wife Yvonne, and the actors David Mahlowe and Zero Mahlowe. ISHVAL, the Institute for the Study of Hierological Values, had as its aims and objectives: a) The promotion and propagation of the principles of Truth in all Religions in order to achieve unity in interpretations of Sacred Writings between all denominations and mutual understanding and practice of the principles of Truth in a true spirit of ecumenism. b) The instruction and education of all persons desirous of learning in the study of hierological values in relation to religion and philosophy for the better appreciation and enjoyment of art and science and the purpose of life.

=== What Is Hierology? ===
Hierology is from the Greek hieros, priest, and logy, meaning "a speaking, discourse, treatise, doctrine, theory, science,". It is defined as sacred literature, learning or a body of knowledge regarding sacred things, the literary or traditional embodiment of the religious beliefs of a people. For example, the sacred texts of different religions.

=== Ecumenism and the principles of truth in all religions ===
Halliday's ecumenism was of the most universal variety. While at the core of his teaching was the concept of the primacy of Jesus Christ, it came from an inner understanding of the nature of Love, and transcended the bounds of any religious orthodoxy. He had an integrated view of the development of world religions. "India's religion (Hinduism) is non-historical, concerns itself with the Eternal Recurrence, the Great Cycle, Days and Nights of Brahma that endlessly follow each other: Yoga is aimed to break the cycle by releasing the individual from Manvantara into eternal Nirvana." In Judaism, a select group of people were separated from the mass of animal-men and subjected to pressures which led to the attainment of group consciousness; their commandments were negative "Thou shalt not". Jesus Christ "presents the first true individuated person able to stand against the elect group". The commandments of Christianity were positive, "Thou shalt love". Having taught his disciples, he left them "so that they too may find themselves and become authors of their own being". "In Islam is no barrier of race or colour or class. The goal was not the individual as such, but the individual-able-to-relate-to-all-beings without self-loss or regression". "The one Eternal Religion which Hindu thought intuited appears in its historical aspect in Judaism, Christianity and Islam, as Law (Father), Love (Son) and Illuminative Knowledge (Holy Ghost). The Fourth Revelation (Maitreya) will but put these three together as of equal validity in the cosmic plan."

== Eugene Halliday Association ==
ISHVAL closed as a charity in 2015, its work being continuous with the newly formed, more simply administered, not-for-profit organisation, Eugene Halliday Association. Its members recognise that Eugene Halliday worked to enable the development of potential of himself and all those who are willing to work with him. He left a legacy of written, artistic and spoken work setting out his principles of self-development, the way to reflexive self-consciousness and an understanding of how to live in the world. Its aims and objectives are: 1) To educate ourselves through studying and engaging with the work of Eugene Halliday, artist and writer, and the principles he taught. 2) To establish and communicate a wider awareness of the legacy of Eugene Halliday and to encourage and support others who are interested to study and engage with his work. 3) To investigate areas of study to which Eugene Halliday introduced us, and other appropriate areas which may be worthy of investigation. These include art, religion, philosophy and science. Its mission is: 'Our purpose is self-development: to centre and balance ourselves through the intelligent co-ordination of clear thought, sensitive feeling and action of good will; to work to develop our creative potential and that of our fellow beings.'

== Central concepts in the work of Eugene Halliday ==
=== Reflexive self-consciousness ===
Reflexive self-consciousness is perhaps the most important and core concept in Eugene Halliday's work. In his book, "Reflexive Self-Consciousness", published in the 1950s, he sets out a way by which we can develop the ability to respond adequately to the demands life makes of us, the ability to assimilate the shocks and blows of experience, so we can live a whole and balanced life. The way to this balance is through an understanding of the centre of our own being, our consciousness, and through this, finding our place in relation to the universe.

=== Advaita, or non-dualism ===
Halliday's philosophy is non-dualist, as in the Hindu concept of advaita, expounded by Adi Shankara and other advaitin philosophers. Advaita is sometimes described as a monistic philosophy, but Halliday is careful to distinguish it both from monism and pluralism, as a description of the nature of the universe, and our relationship to 'God' or 'absolute sentient power' (see above) (A.S.P.). "Infinity is not comprehensible in a monistic concept, for monism implies circumscription, which is encapsulation or finitisation [making finite]. Non-dualism and Non-pluralism refer to the Infinity of the Absolute Sentient Power (A.S.P.), the infinite modalising activities of which generate all noumena and phenomena. Monism is an attempt to grasp in a knowable concept that which is of itself unknowable, for to know is to finite form within the A.S.P."

According to Adi Shankara's Advaita Vedanta, Brahman (God, or the Supreme Cosmic Spirit) is the only reality; Maya is the illusionary power of Brahman "which causes the Brahman to be seen as the illusory world"; the Atman (soul or self) is not different from Brahman (see Wikipedia article Advaita Vedanta).

Halliday's concept of 'A.S.P.' is related to the Hindu concept of Brahman, and to the Greek philosopher Anaximander's apeiron, the 'limitless or boundless' source of the world. "The Absolute is an infinite sentient power, an eternal continuum of motion. Because it is sentient it feels its own motion. Its motion is the content of its sentiency. It is from this fact that is derived the principle that says that a being knows only the modifications of its own substance; or consciousness is aware only of its own modalities". Individual beings are rotatory motions, or modalities, within the A.S.P., and are not-different from It. And not only individual beings but all phenomena: "Ultimately we have to say that all things we know, all the ideas we think, and all the feeling states we experience, the totality of phenomena of all worlds, are merely modalities of the motion initiated and sustained by the Infinite Sentient Power we call God".

== Related concepts ==
=== Panentheism ===
Although he does not seem to have employed the term, Halliday's religious philosophy can be described as one of Panentheism (pan-en-theism, all-within-god), the view that the universe is within God and that God also transcends the universe. The term was coined by German idealist philosopher Karl Christian Friedrich Krause (1781–1832). Halliday did not hold with the view of pantheism, which sees the universe as identical with God. He was well-versed both in comparative religion and the science of his day, and wrote extensively on the relation between the different religions, and between science and religion. He often quoted Einstein's equation and said "We all know today, as a matter of fact, not fantasy, that matter can be broken down and demonstrated to be energy". One of the authors he recommended was Alfred North Whitehead, mathematician and philosopher of science, who had noted that the dominant model for the natural world had moved from mechanism to organism during the 19th century. In panentheism is found a concept of God in which natural laws and processes are respected.

== Exhibitions ==
1942:The Manchester Academy of Fine Arts, Spring Exhibition which included a portrait "Old Harry" by Eugene Halliday and a portrait by Käthe Schuftan.

1943: The Manchester Ballet Club, exhibition for the benefit of "Mrs. Churchill's Aid to Russian Fund", which included a scraperboard by Eugene Halliday and a watercolour by Käthe Schuftan. Other artists included John Bold, John Bowes, Janet Kirk, Ruth M. Marshall, W.J. Colclough, Ian Grant, Joan Werschy and Maurice Crane.

1947: Gibb's Bookshop, Manchester, exhibition which included works by Eugene Halliday and Käthe Schuftan. Other artists included Jose Christopherson, N.G. Hopwood, J. Gordon Smith.

== Books ==
All Published by Melchisedec Press, edited by David Mahlowe

- Defence of the Devil – ISBN 1-872240-00-3
- Reflexive Self-Consciousness – ISBN 1-872240-01-1
- The Tacit Conspiracy – ISBN 1-872240-02-X
- Contributions from a Potential Corpse (in four volumes) – ISBN 1-872240-03-8, ISBN 1-872240-04-6, ISBN 1-872240-06-2, ISBN 1-872240-07-0
- The Conquest of Anxiety – ISBN 1-872240-09-7
- Essays on God – ISBN 1-872240-08-9
- Through the Bible (in four volumes) – ISBN 1-872240-10-0, ISBN 1-872240-13-5, ISBN 1-872240-14-3, ISBN 1-872240-15-1
- Christian Philosophy (in two volumes) – ISBN 1-872240-16-X, ISBN 1-872240-17-8
