= William Knight Keeling =

English painter (1807–1886)

- Born: 1807; Manchester, England
- Died: 1886 (aged 78–79); Barton-upon-Irwell, Manchester, England
- Known for: Portraits
- Notable work: Love's Messenger (1856); Spanish Boy (1876)

William Knight Keeling (1807–1886) was a British (Victorian) artist, an illustrator of Walter Scott's novels and Shakespeare's plays, and a founder member and the third President of the Manchester Academy of Fine Arts.

== Background and career ==
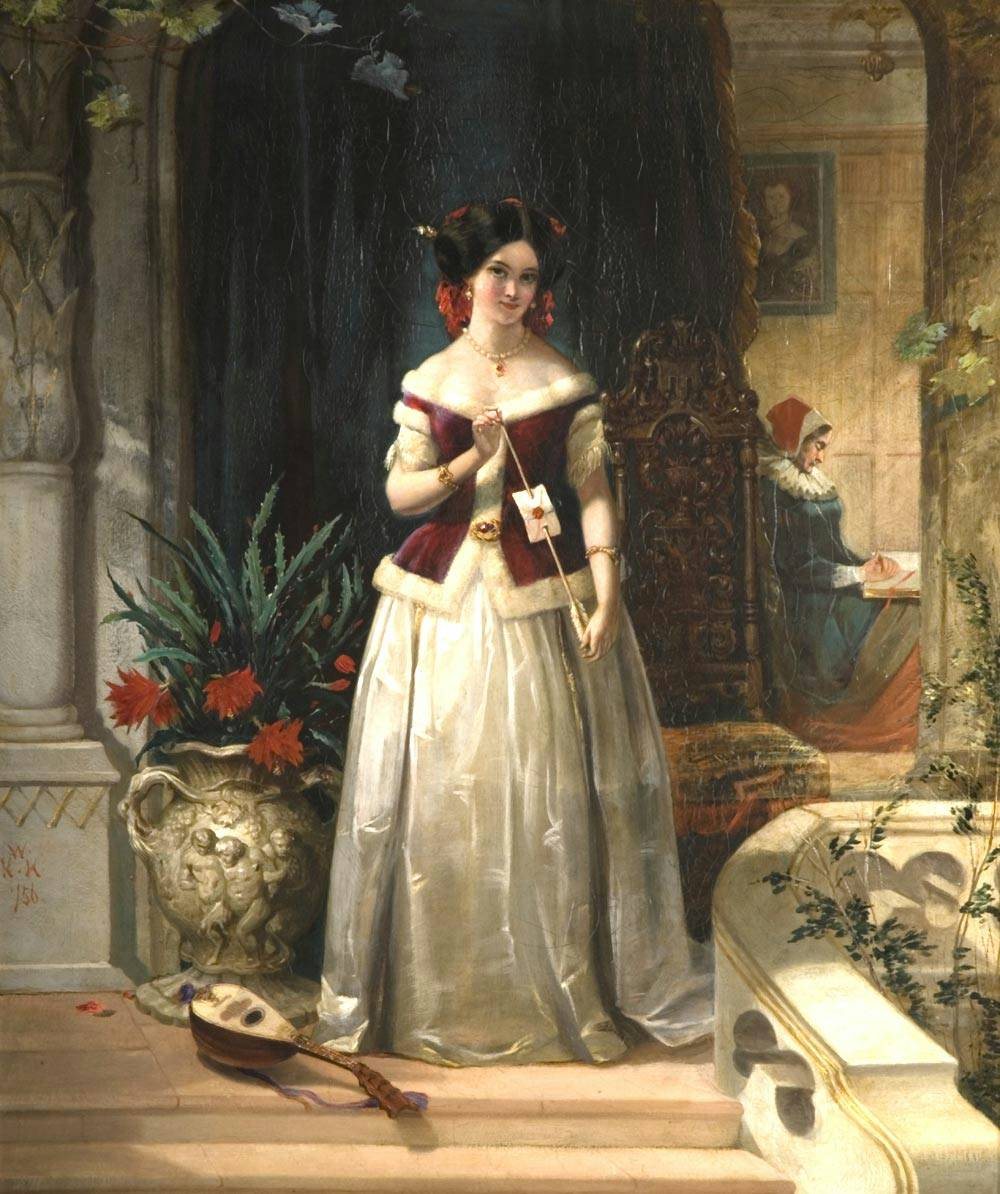
William Knight Keeling, Love's Messenger (1856)

Keeling was born in Manchester. He was apprenticed to a wood-engraver, and in the 1830s went to London and became an assistant of William Bradley (1801-1857), a Manchester-born artist who moved to London in 1822 and established himself as a portrait painter.

Keeling returned to Manchester in 1835, and worked as a portrait and figurative painter in oils and watercolour, and a drawing-master. From the 1830s he actively exhibited in Manchester, Liverpool and elsewhere. In 1833 his painting 'The Bird's Nest' was awarded the silver medal from the Royal Manchester Institution. In 1841 he was elected a member of the New Society of Painters in Watercolours, where he exhibited about 60 works.

In 1859 Keeling became a founder of the Manchester Academy of Fine Arts, and its third president from 1865 to 1877. He was a member of the Manchester Literary Club and the Brasenose Club.

== Spain ==
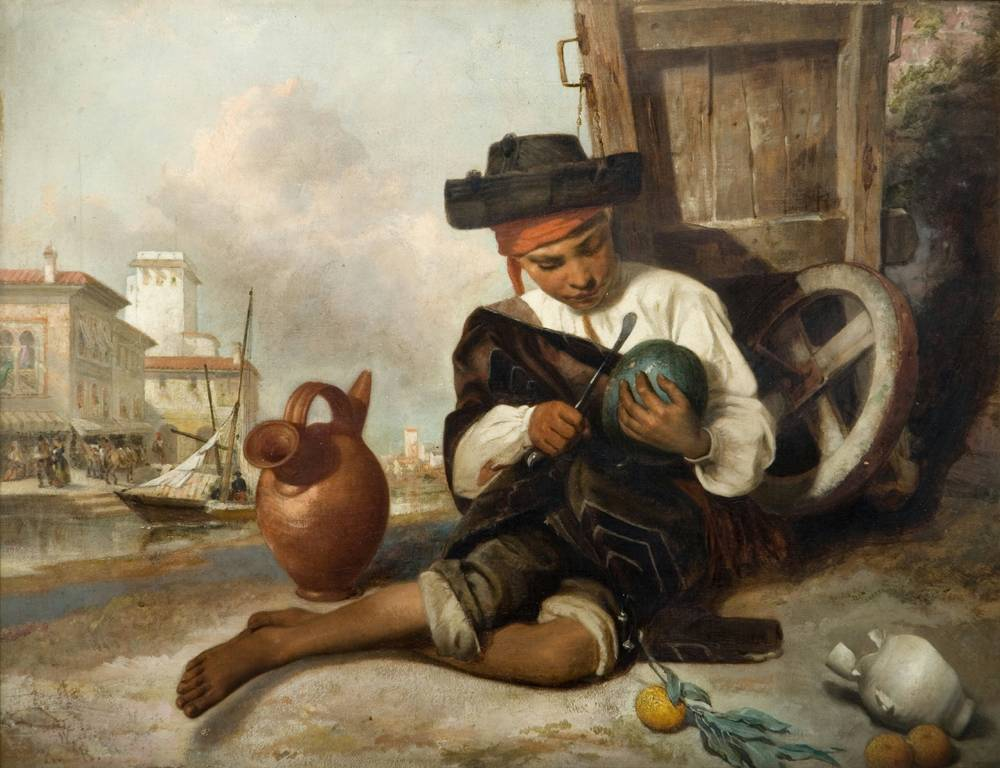
William Knight Keeling, Melon Seller (1870s)

In the 1850s, following the notion of the day, he travelled to Spain. This journey gave him new ideas, subjects, and motifs. Delicate details and a clear and bright palette, inspired by the hot colours of the South, are distinctive features of his paintings and watercolours. In 1873 a Manchester newspaper praised one of his watercolours as "an exquisite work, perfectly Spanish".

He also was influenced by works by the Spanish artist Bartolomé Estéban Murillo (1617–1682). Murillo’s street children can be easily recognised in Keeling’s depictions of poor children, both British and Spanish. His ‘Spanish Boy’ exhibited in Manchester in 1876, was described as "a very good example of the careful and accurate method pursued by the artist. He is thoroughly conscientious in all his professional work."

== Works ==
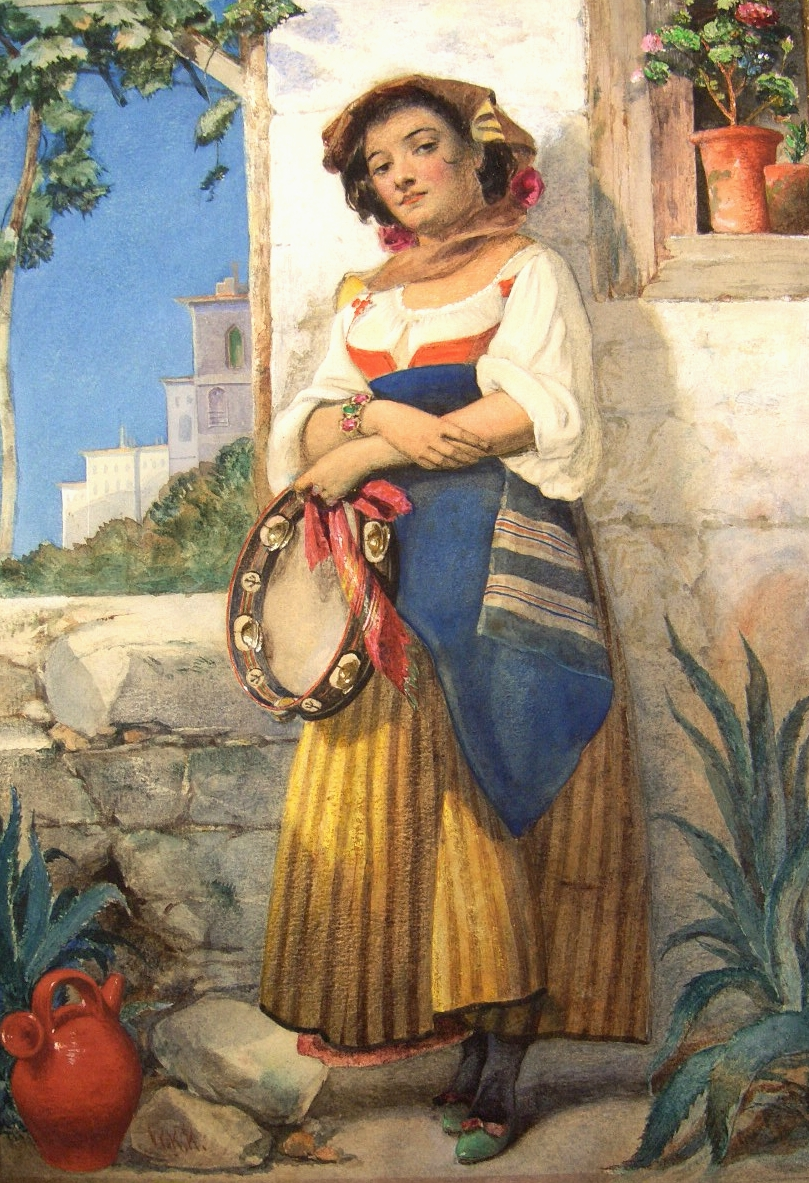
William Knight Keeling, Tamburine Girl

Keeling did not strive for fame and glory, and remained in the background of the artistic life of his time, although many connoisseurs appreciated his works. Several of his works are in the collection of the Victoria & Albert Museum, London. In the 1870s, Wolverhampton industrialist and collector Sidney Cartwright purchased from a Manchester exhibition a large number of Keeling’s works. In 1887 they were given to Wolverhampton Art Gallery, which possesses today possibly the largest collection of Keeling’s paintings and watercolours in the United Kingdom.

== Family ==
Keeling married Mary Ann Dettmer (b. 1822) at St Pancras 25 January 1851. They had four children: Edith (b. 1852), Dalton Harper (b. 1853), Sidney Charles (b. 1859), and Gertrude Ann (b. 1862). Keeling died on 21 February 1886 in his house at Barton-upon-Irwell, Manchester.

Professional and academic associations
Preceded by John Lamont Brodie	President of the Manchester Academy of Fine Arts; 1862–65	Succeeded by Robert Crozier
