= Harry Rutherford =

English artist

- Born: 1903; Denton, Manchester
- Died: 1985 (aged 81–82); Manchester
- Education: Hyde School of Art; Manchester School of Art
- Movement: Northern School

Harry Rutherford (1903–1985) was a British painter who is regarded as one of the most important painters of the "Northern School", a group led by L. S. Lowry which depicted the post-industrial changes around North West England. He was the first visual artist to present a television programme, and later became President of the Manchester Academy of Fine Arts.

== Background ==
He was born at Market Street, Denton, Manchester, the youngest of four sons of hat trimmer William Rutherford and his wife Mary Swindells. (Note: Hat manufacture was a local industry based in Hyde and Stockport. Rutherford's family had moved to Hyde in 1905.)

He left school at 14, but while still there attended the Hyde School of Art and continued his studies at the Manchester School of Art under Pierre Adolphe Valette; L. S. Lowry was among his fellow pupils. In 1925, Rutherford was the first and youngest pupil to enrol in Walter Sickert's new school of art in Manchester. His association with Sickert was lifelong, and Sickert referred to Rutherford as "my intellectual heir and successor."

== Career ==
In 1931, Rutherford moved to London. The new medium of television provided opportunities for him to exploit his ability to sketch rapidly. In 1936–39 and in 1946, Rutherford presented the BBC Television light entertainment programme Cabaret Cartoons, (Note: BBC Television suspended broadcasting on 1 September 1939 with the outbreak of World War II, and only resumed in June 1946.) in which he drew variety artists as they performed their acts. In 1950–56, he starred in his own programme, Sketchbook.

On a trip to Borneo in 1957-58, the British Council organized two exhibitions of his work, which were the first exhibitions of western art in the country.

He returned to Hyde in the late 1950s to 17 Nelson Street and was elected President of the Manchester Academy of Fine Arts. In his later years, he taught at the Regional College of Art in Manchester, where his pupils included the painter Geoffrey Key.

== Collections ==
Rutherford's work is in several public art collections including: The Royal Academy, Manchester Art Gallery, The Atkinson Gallery, Gallery Oldham and Rochdale Art Gallery.

== The Rutherford Gallery ==
In 2008 Tameside Metropolitan Borough Council opened an exhibition space in Hyde Library to display permanently the town's collection of Rutherford works. The Rutherford Gallery, celebrates the life of the artist.

There are two Blue Plaques for Rutherford in Hyde. One is on his former home 17 Nelson Street, keeping a studio next door and there is one on Hyde Town Hall.

== Bibliography ==
- The Northern School: A Reappraisal, Martin Regan, 2016 978-1527203204
- Centre Stage, The Art of Harry Rutherford, Stephen Whittle, Tameside Museums, 2013

Professional and academic associations
Preceded by John Richardson Gauld	President of the Manchester Academy of Fine Arts; 1961–69	Succeeded by Roger Hampson
