= Andrew MacCallum =

British painter

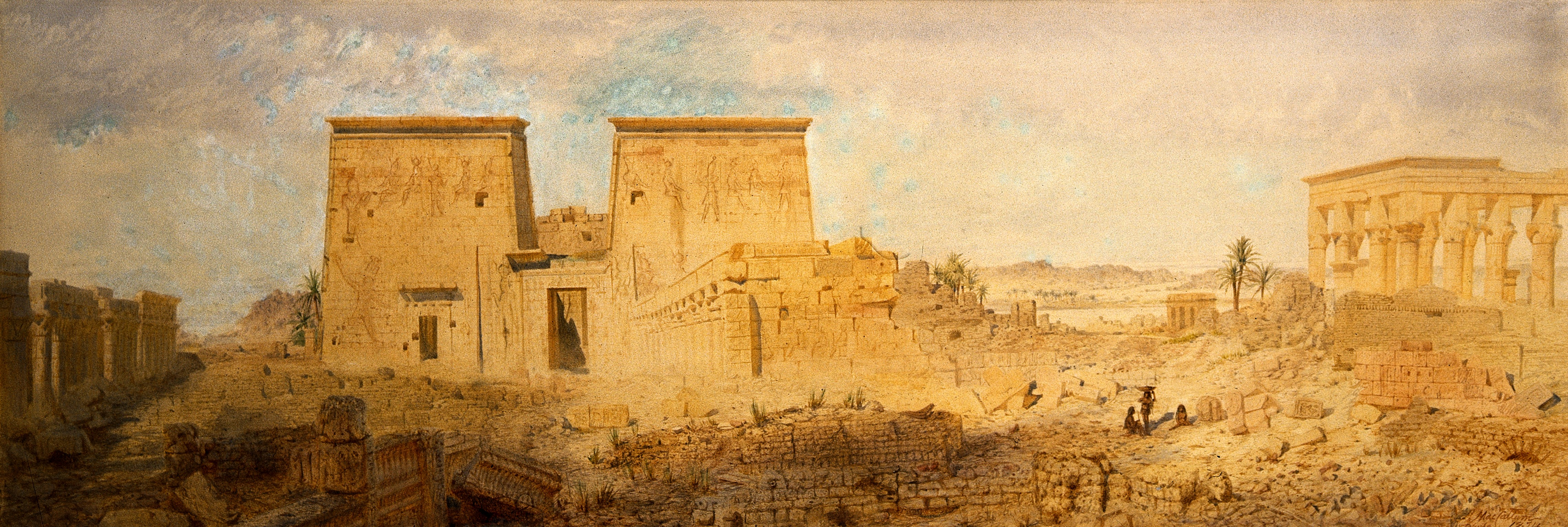
- Temples at Philae on the Nile, Watercolour by A. MacCallum, 1874
- Born: c. 1821; Nottingham, England
- Died: 22 January 1902; London, England
- Education: Government School of Art at Nottingham.
- Known for: Painter of landscape, genre scenes and Oriental life
- Movement: Orientalist

Andrew McCullum (c. 1821–1902) was a British landscape painter.

== Life ==
Born at Nottingham, of Scottish Highland background, he was son of an employee at the William Gibson & Sons hosiery manufactory there. He was brought up near Sherwood Forest, and unwillingly apprenticed against his will to his father's business. An interest in drawing was encouraged by Thomas Bailey who allowed him to copy pictures in his collection.

On his 21st birthday McCallum left home, and maintained himself by teaching. Aged 22 twenty-two he became a student in the recently founded Government School of Art at Nottingham. He exhibited a view of Flint Castle at the British Institution in London in 1849. About this time he became a student at the Government School of Design at Somerset House, where J. R. Herbert, Richard Redgrave, and John Callcott Horsley were among his instructors. In 1850 he first exhibited at the Royal Academy. From that year till 1852 he was assistant master at the Manchester School of Art, and from 1852 to 1854 he was headmaster of the School of Art at Stourbridge, after the brief tenure from 1851 of Henry Alexander Bowler. There he resided at the Old Parsonage, New Street.

In 1854 MacCallum went to Italy with a travelling studentship awarded by the Science and Art Department. Part of his time was spent on mural decorations; returning to England in 1857, he decorated the western exterior of the Sheepshanks Gallery at the South Kensington Museum with panels of sgraffito. He then concentrated on landscape, with subjects at Burnham Beeches and in Windsor Forest. Among patrons were John Phillip and James Nasmyth, and he was awarded a silver medal by the Society for the Encouragement of the Fine Arts.

Towards the end of 1861 MacCallum painted at Fontainebleau; in 1864 he worked in Switzerland and on the River Rhine; in 1866 he was in Italy; in the winter of 1866–7 he was in the neighbourhood of Paris. Between 1870 and 1875 he paid several visits to Egypt where he made many sketches of rural life. He was "the Painter" who accompanied Amelia Edwards in 1873- 1874 on her Dahabiya in her best selling book "A Thousand Miles Up the Nile". About 1875 he was commissioned by Queen Victoria to paint five views near Balmoral. He sometimes lectured on art subjects.

MacCallum died on 22 January 1902 at 5 The Studios, Holland Park Road, Kensington, London. He had lived in the neighbourhood since 1858 when he leased from Thomas Webster his house in The Mall, Kensington.

== Works ==
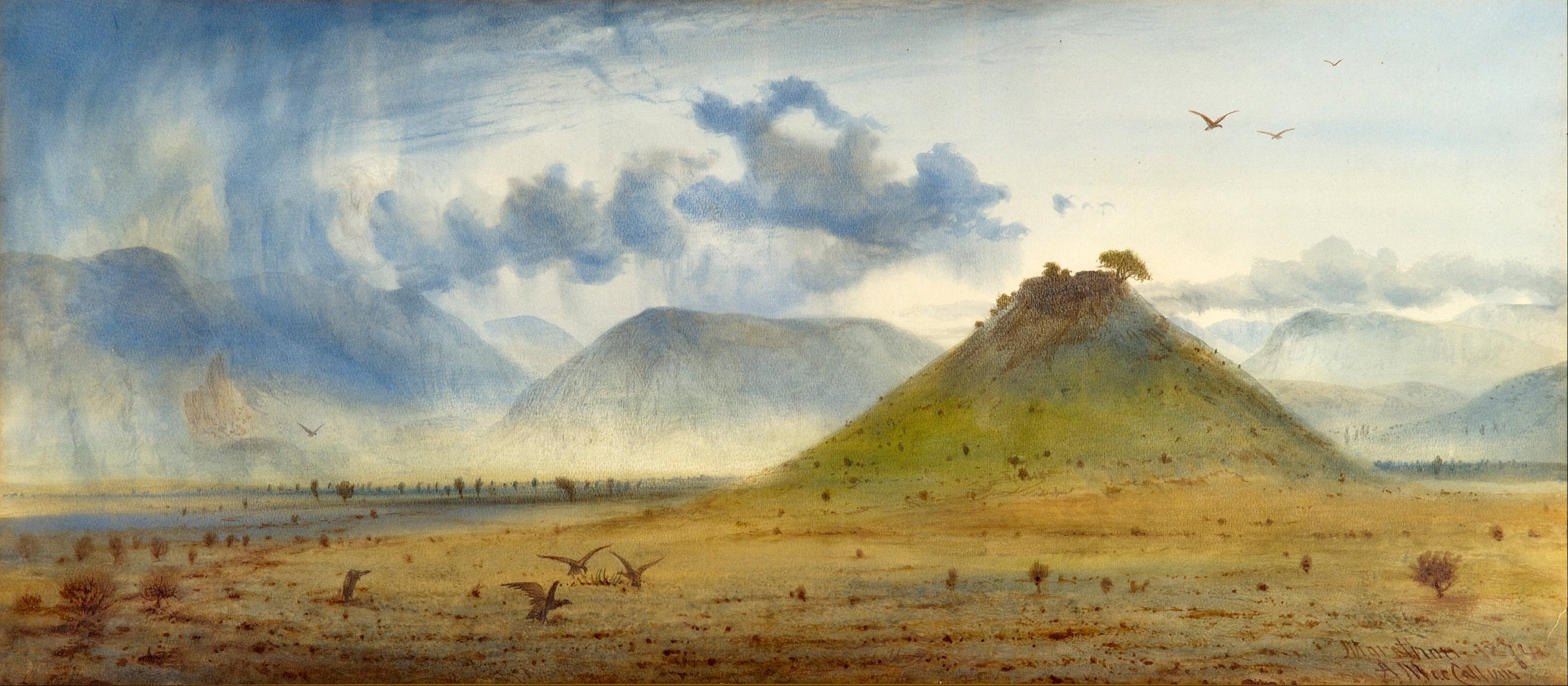
Andrew MacCallum, View of Marathon (1874)

MacCallum's reputation rested mainly on woodland subjects. He sent 53 pictures to the Royal Academy (1850–1886) and others to the British Institution, Society of British Artists, and International Exhibitions (1870–1). Special exhibitions of his paintings were held at the Dudley Gallery in 1866 and at Nottingham in 1873; his Sultry Eve was shown at the Centennial Exhibition at Philadelphia in 1876. He used water-colour, and drew in pastel and in gold, silver, and copper point.

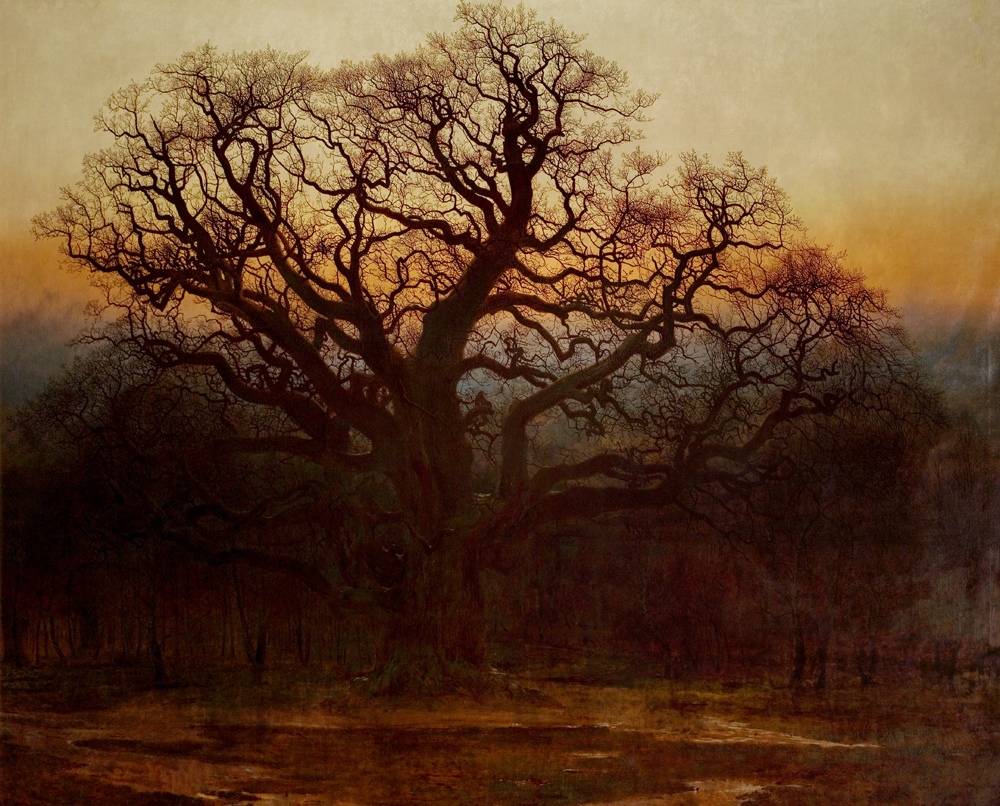
The Major Oak, Sherwood Forest (1882), by Andrew MacCallum

The Tate Gallery acquired MacCallum's Silvery Moments, Burnham Beeches (1885), and The Monarch of the Glen; the Victoria and Albert Museum his In Sherwood Forest—Winter Evening after Rain (1881), S. Maria delle Grazie, Milan (1854), Rome from the Porta San Pancrazio (1855–6), The Burning of Rome by Nero, and the Massacre of the Christians (1878–9), and Head of Christ after Daniele Crespi. The City of Nottingham Art Gallery bought The Major Oak, Sherwood Forest (1882), measuring about 9 ft. by 12 ft., and The Opening Scene in Bailey's "Festus".

== Family ==
MacCallum was twice married. His first marriage, in 1852, was to Susan Irlam Tetlow (1832-1871), the daughter of John Tetlow, a painter. His second marriage, on 18 June 1879, was to Laura Salwey (born 1856), daughter of Ludlow solicitor Humphrey Salway. At the time of their marriage, MacCallum was 57 to his wife's 25. MacCallum petitioned for a divorce from Laura in April 1888, on the grounds of her alleged adultery with Ernest Malleson. During the divorce proceedings, Laura complained of cruelty on the part of MacCallum, arguing that he had tried to lock her up in a lunatic asylum when she was sane (his first wife had died in a private lunatic asylum). The divorce was granted in 1889, with the jury finding that Laura MacCallum was guilty of adultery, but finding Andrew MacCallum not guilty of cruelty. MacCallum had two sons by his second wife: Andrew Humphry Salwey MacCallum (1881-1972) and Alfred Erasmus Geoffrey MacCallum (1882-1933). Both sons served in the Second Boer War.
