= Breton Women =

1888 painting by Vincent van Gogh

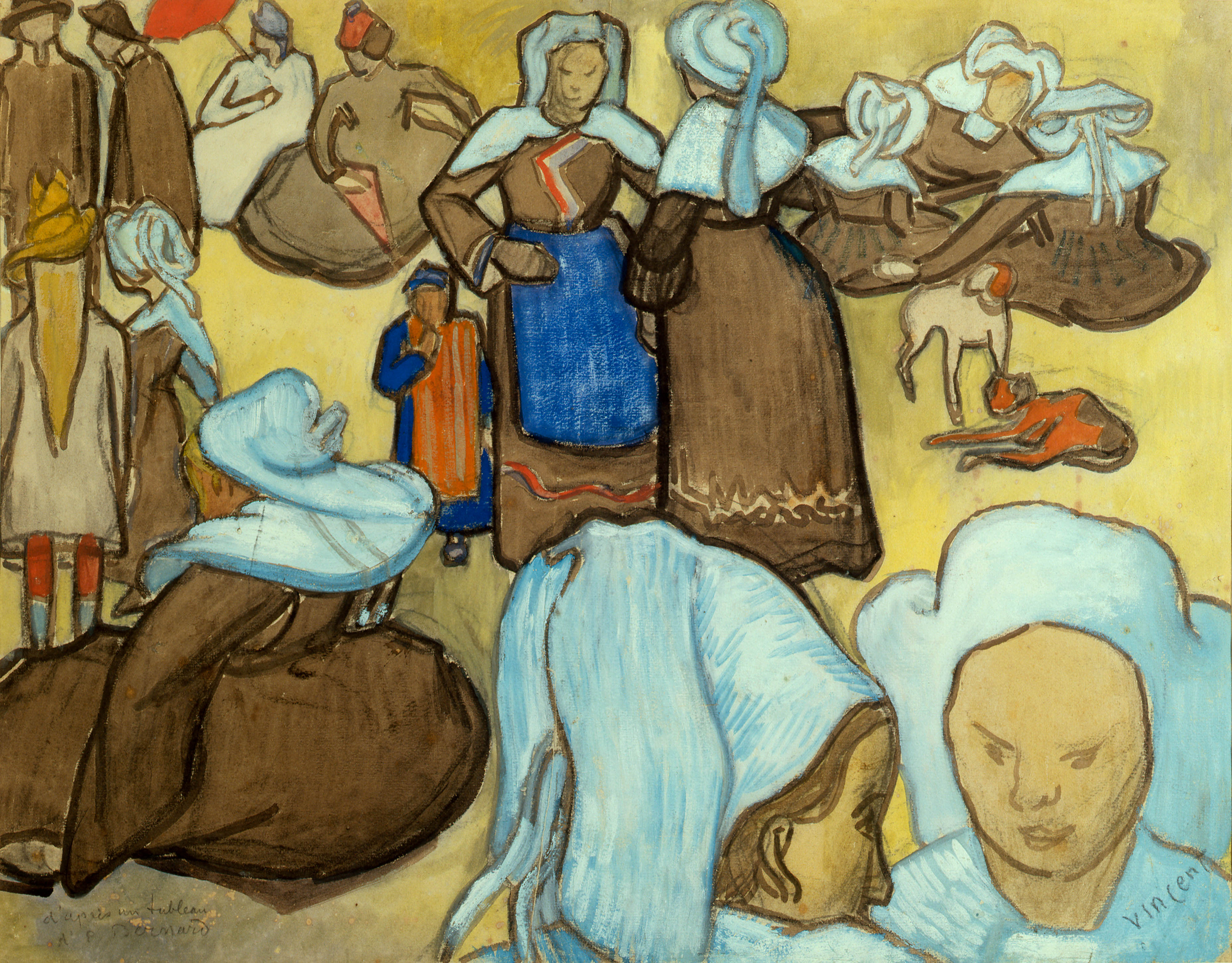
- Artist: Vincent van Gogh
- Year: 1888
- Catalogue: F1422, JH1654
- Medium: watercolor
- Dimensions: 60 cm × 73.7 cm (24 in × 29.0 in)
- Location: Galleria d'Arte Moderna, Milan; Milan, Italia

Breton Women is an 1888 watercolour painting by Vincent van Gogh, copying a work by Émile Bernard, a friend of both van Gogh and Paul Gauguin who also produced Breton Women at a Wall on a similar subject. It is now in the collection of the Galleria d'arte moderna in Milan.

== See also ==
- List of works by Vincent van Gogh
