= Emmanuel Levy =

British painter (1900–1986)

- Born: 1900; Hightown, Manchester, England
- Died: 1986 (aged 85–86)
- Occupations: Painter, teacher, art critic

Emmanuel Levy (1900–1986) was a Manchester painter, teacher and art critic.

== Career ==
Levy studied art in Manchester, London and Paris. Under Pierre Valette at the Manchester School of Art he was a fellow student of LS Lowry. In the beginning he was interested in Cubism, Expressionism and Surrealism but discarded them later for a more naturalistic style, although within it is range was wide. His central theme was the human condition, in which he produced some powerful works.

Levy’s first exhibition was in 1924 at the Manchester City Gallery, which was to be the first of many both at home and abroad. Among others he had six solo shows in Manchester between 1925–63 plus a number in London. There was a retrospective at Salford City Art Gallery, 1948; another at Fieldborne Galleries, 1976; and one at Stockport Art Gallery, 1982.

From 1929, for several years, he was Art Critic for Manchester City News and the Evening News. His drawings have appeared on television programmes including the series of Magnolia Street, the saga of Jewish life in Hightown and Cheetham by Louis Golding. He was famous for provokante Jewish-themed works, such as the crucifixion which shows a religious Jewish man nailed to the cross painted in 1942.

Levy was a skilled portraitist: His portrait of physicist Patrick Blackett is held in the National Portrait Gallery. Also Ben Uri Gallery and galleries in Manchester, Stockport and Salford hold his work. Levy himself is included in a National Portrait Gallery collection of photographs.

Levy taught art at Victoria University of Manchester School of Architecture, and was a Lecturer at Manchester and Stockport College of Art during the 1950s and 1960s. He was a member of the Manchester Society of Modern Painters and the Manchester Academy of Fine Arts.

== Personal life ==
The son of Russian-Jewish immigrants was born in Hightown, Manchester, the area immortalized by the Jewish writer Louis Golding in his best-selling novel Magnolia Street (1932), which Levy later adapted as a radio play. His father was the beadle at the Great Synagogue, Cheetham Hill and Levy attended the local Jews’ Free School, before studying.

Emmanuel Levy became married to his fellow artist Ursula Leo (1915-1984). Berliner by birth she came to Britain as a refugee 1939. She had studied art, music and languages in Dresden, Breslau and Paris. Although a talented artist herself, she decided to stand back behind her husband and worked very seldom as a painter herself. She was his most frequent model and promoted his career.

In the paintings ‘The Chessmen’ Levy says of the series “all the world's a chessboard and the chess pieces merely players, each given a part to play and playing it rather badly, expressing the tragedy and confusion of our time without shedding too many tears” . This quotation has been used by a number of critics in their reviews of the twelve paintings.

== Works in UK public collections ==
Works of Levy are held by The National Portrait Gallery, Manchester Art Gallery, Salford Museum and Art Gallery, and six other UK public collections.
