= Robert Crozier (artist) =

English painter (1815–1891)

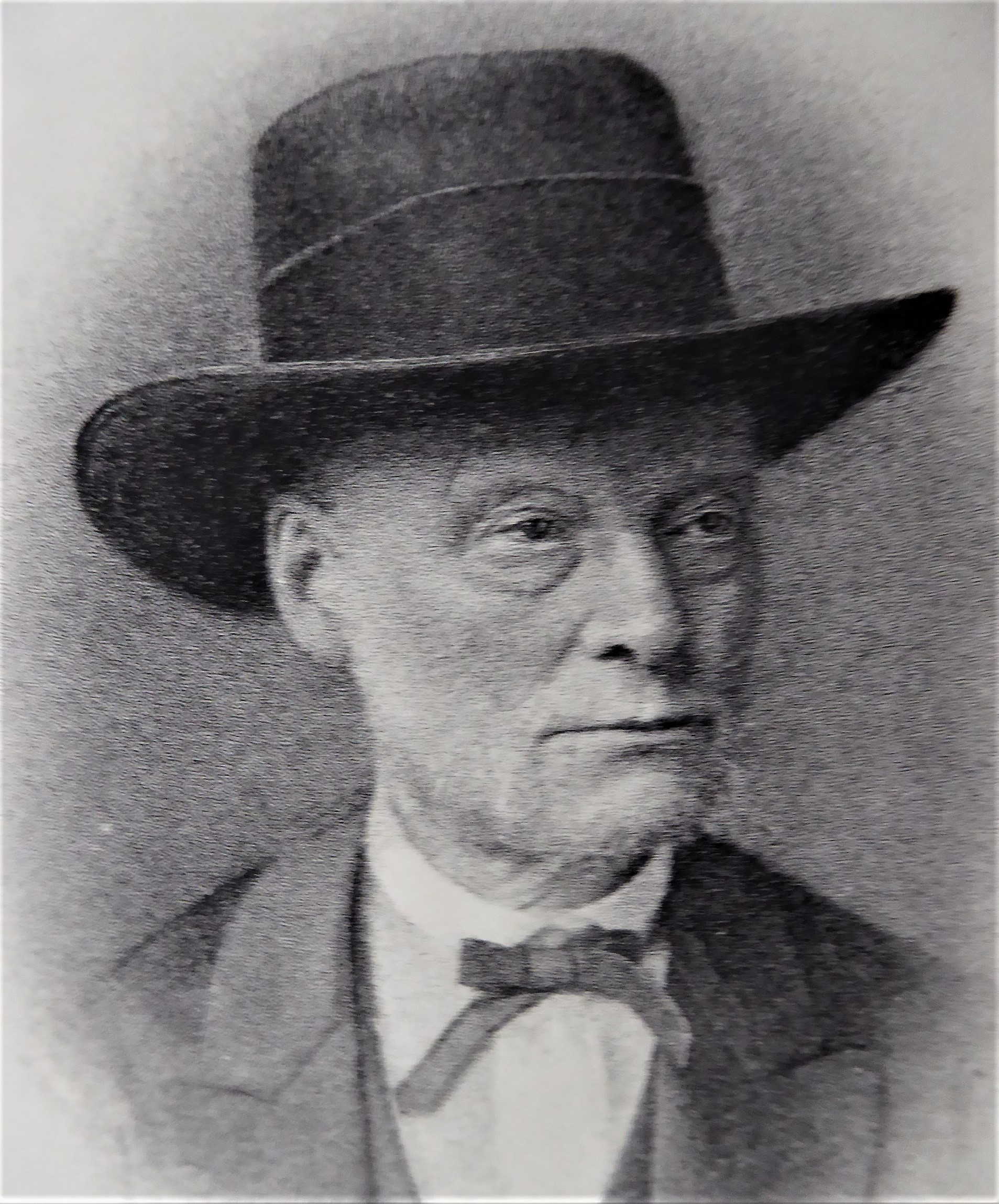
- Robert Crozier
- Born: 17 October 1815; Blackburn, Lancashire
- Died: 7 February 1891 (aged 75); Chorlton-on-Medlock, Manchester
- Education: Manchester School of Design
- Known for: Portraits

Robert Crozier (1815–1891) was an English portrait artist, based in Manchester. He was one of the Founder Members, and later President, of the Manchester Academy of Fine Arts.

== Background ==
Robert Crozier was born on 17 October 1815 in Blackburn, Lancashire. His father was George Crozier, a saddler and botanist. After a childhood in Blackburn, Bolton and Warrington, he moved to Manchester in 1836, attending the Manchester School of Design from its opening in 1838, and became established as a portrait painter studying under William Bradley (1801–1857).

== Career ==
He exhibited at the Royal Manchester Institution in 1841, and the Royal Academy in 1854. After the success of an 1857 exhibition at the Langworthy Gallery, Peel Park, Salford, Crozier and other local artists established the Manchester Academy of Fine Arts in 1859. Crozier was elected literary secretary of the Academy in 1861, becoming Treasurer in 1868, and President in 1878.

Crozier died at his home at Sydney Street, Chorlton-on-Medlock, Manchester on 7 February 1891. His son George Crozier (1846–1915) was a landscape painter.

Professional and academic associations
Preceded by William Knight Keeling	President of the Manchester Academy of Fine Arts; 1878–91	Succeeded by Elias Mollineaux Bancroft
