= Broughton High School, Salford, Greater Manchester =

Former secondary school in Salford, England

Broughton High School Salford was a former secondary school in Salford, England. It was situated on Duke Street in Lower Broughton. The school was formerly known as Broughton Secondary Modern from its opening in 1950. It changed its name to Lowry High School in 1987.

Lowry High closed its doors in August 2000 and the building was used by a local Jewish school before its demolition in 2007.

Mountaineer Don Whillans was a pupil in the 1940s as was Manchester United footballer Stan Pearson.

== Gallery ==
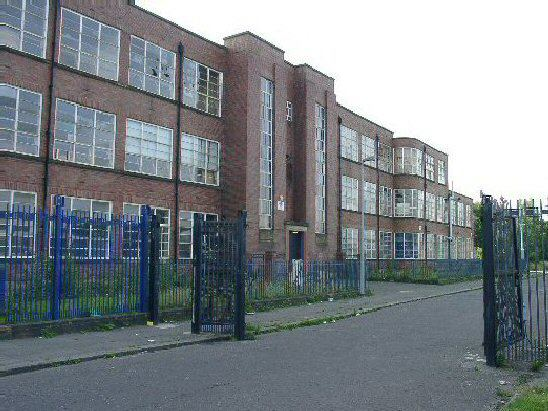
View from Duke Street

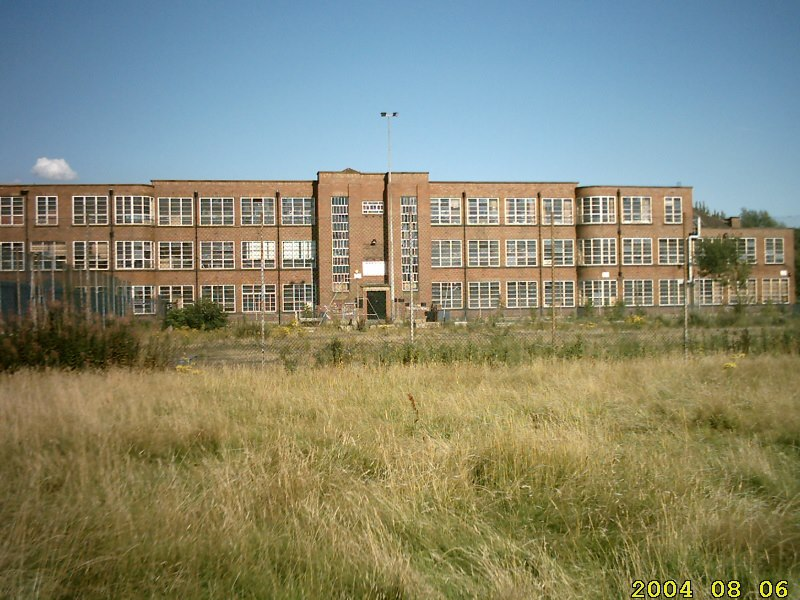
View from Camp Street

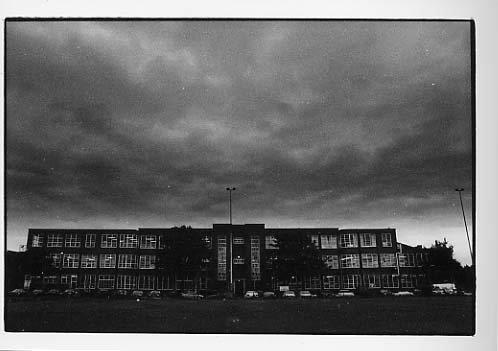
View from Camp Street

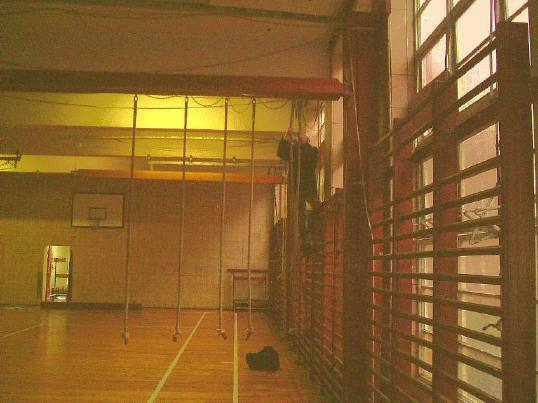
View inside the school gym

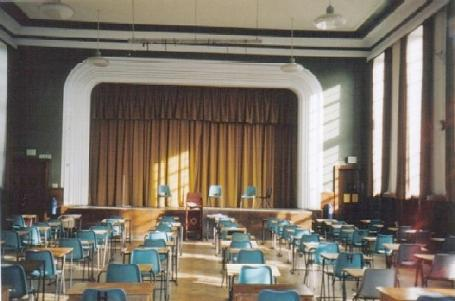
View inside the schools main hall
