= Manchester Academy of Fine Arts =

British art society

- Formation: 1859; 167 years ago
- Type: Learned Society
- Headquarters: Manchester, England
- Activities: Exhibitions, workshops
- Collections: Archives
- Archivist: Peter Davis
- President (26th): Janina Cebertowicz
- Website: mafa.org.uk
- Remarks: Promotion of art and artists

The Manchester Academy of Fine Arts (MAFA) is an art society in Manchester, England. Founded in 1859, it promotes art and education. It was originally based in the building on Mosley Street which is now the Manchester Art Gallery, where annual exhibitions and classes were held.

== Exhibitions and workshops ==
The academy holds member exhibitions, talks and workshops at venues across Greater Manchester and North West England. Venues have included Bury Art Museum, Gallery Oldham, Salford Museum and Art Gallery, Atkinson Art Gallery, Southport, Stockport War Memorial Art Gallery and Dean Clough.

== Membership ==
There is currently an elected membership (full and associate members) of over one hundred artists working in a variety of disciplines including painting, printmaking, drawing, sculpture and ceramics. Members have played a significant role in the Manchester art scene for over a century, including the design of several of its buildings and public works.

Past members of the academy have included Alfred Waterhouse, Ford Madox Brown, LS Lowry, Käthe Schuftan, Norman Adams, Emmanuel Levy and Anne Redpath. Past presidents have included the artists William Knight Keeling and Robert Crozier. Annie Swynnerton and Emma Magnus were some of the first pioneering women to be elected in 1884. The work of John Cassidy, the first sculptor member, can be seen in Manchester city centre.

== Manchester School of Art ==
The academy has close links with art education and currently supports graduate students at Manchester School of Art, now part of Manchester Metropolitan University, by awarding annual prizes and offering the opportunity to show work in Academy exhibitions. A link with Manchester Metropolitan University has existed since the academy's foundation: past and present members have taught and studied there. Some have studied elsewhere under recognised artists: Margaret Pilkington was taught by Lucien Pissarro at the Slade, Harry Rutherford studied under Walter Sickert and John McCombs was taught by Leon Kossoff at St Martin's School of Art.

== Presidents ==
- 1859–1862 James Astbury Hammersley
- 1862–1865 John Lamont Brodie
- 1865–1878 William Knight Keeling
- 1878–1891 Robert Crozier
- 1891–1892 Elias Mollineaux Bancroft
- 1892–1915 Henry Clarence Whaite
- 1915–1917 John Ely
- 1917–1920 Thomas Edwin Mostyn
- 1920–1924 Francis Edgar Dodd
- 1924–1935 Bertram Nicholls
- 1935–1946 James Patchell Chettle
- 1946–1949 Thomas Cantrell Dugdale
- 1949–1951 Charles Oppenheimer
- 1951–1961 John Richardson Gauld
- 1961–1969 Harry Rutherford
- 1969–1978 Roger Hampson
- 1978–1984 Keith Godwin
- 1984–1990 Norman Clifford Jacques
- 1990–1993 Glenys Latham
- 1993–1997 Peter Oakley
- 1997–2003 Ian Thompson
- 2003–2008 John A McPake
- 2009–2015 John McCombs
- 2016–2019 Gerry Halpin
- 2019–2022 Malcolm Taylor
- 2022–2024 Kath Lowe
- 2024–present Janina Cebertowicz

== General references ==
- Dewsbury, Sheila, The Story So Far: The Manchester Academy of Fine Arts, 1859–2003.
- Davies, Peter (1989), A Northern School, Bristol: Redcliffe Press.
- Davies, Peter (2015), A Northern School Revisited, Clark Art Ltd.
- Wyke, Terry (2004), Public Sculpture in Greater Manchester, Liverpool University Press.
- Manchester Academy of Fine Arts, Archive.
- Marks, Diana F. (2006), Children's Book Award Handbook, Libraries Unlimited (Chapter 6 on Randolph Caldecott and the Randolph Caldecott Medal).
- Nairne, Sandy and Howgate, Sarah (15 March 2006), The Portrait Now, Yale University Press.
- Thomson, Susan W. (2007), Manchester's Victorian Art Scene and its Unrecognised Artists, Manchester Art Press.
- Buckman, David (17 September 2003), "Tom Titherington: Obituary", The Independent.
