= Joseph Parry (artist) =

British painter and engraver (1756-1826)

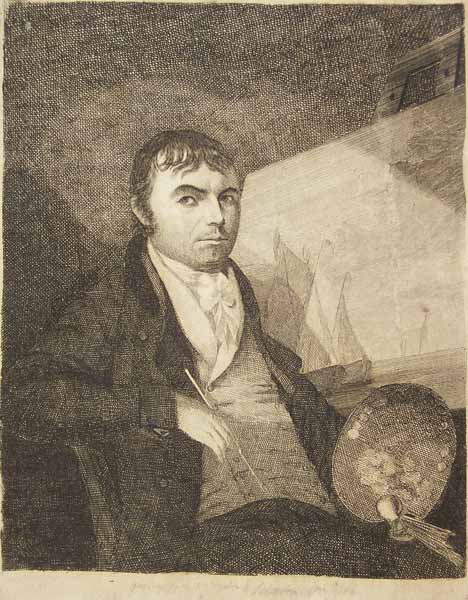
- Engraved self-portrait, c.1780
- Born: 6 May 1756; Liverpool, England
- Died: 11 May 1826 (aged 70); Manchester, England

Joseph Parry (1756–1826) was a British painter and engraver. He was popularly known by his contemporaries as Old Parry to distinguish him from his sons James Parry and David Henry Parry, also artists.

Though a native of Liverpool, his most significant legacy was as "the Father of Art in Manchester," a title he was given by his contemporaries for his influence on the city's early artistic community.

== Early life ==
Joseph Parry was born on 6 May 1756 in Liverpool, England. His birth year is often misreported as 1744 in sources from the late 19th century onward, despite his age being consistently reported as 70 and not 82 at the time of his death. In 1990, historian John C. P. Burleigh verified Parry's birthday using parish birth records in Liverpool, and discovered that the 1744 date originated with an error in the catalogue for an exhibition in 1893—this was repeated in Parry's entry in the Dictionary of National Biography in 1895 and propagated from there.

Regardless, all sources agree that Parry was the son of a master ship pilot, Benjamin Parry, working in the Liverpool harbour. He apprenticed as a ship and house painter, then later transitioned to fine art and began producing painted portraits, landscapes, and marine and historical scenes, as well as engravings.

== Career ==
=== Art ===
Parry's early career in Liverpool is poorly documented, bar an exhibition in 1787 which included four of his paintings—two marine pieces and two scenes of Castle Street. A Liverpool Privateer Returning with a Prize, dated 1781, is the earliest known ship portrait painted in the city. He engraved his only self-portrait while in Liverpool, sometime around 1780. He was influenced by David Teniers the Younger.

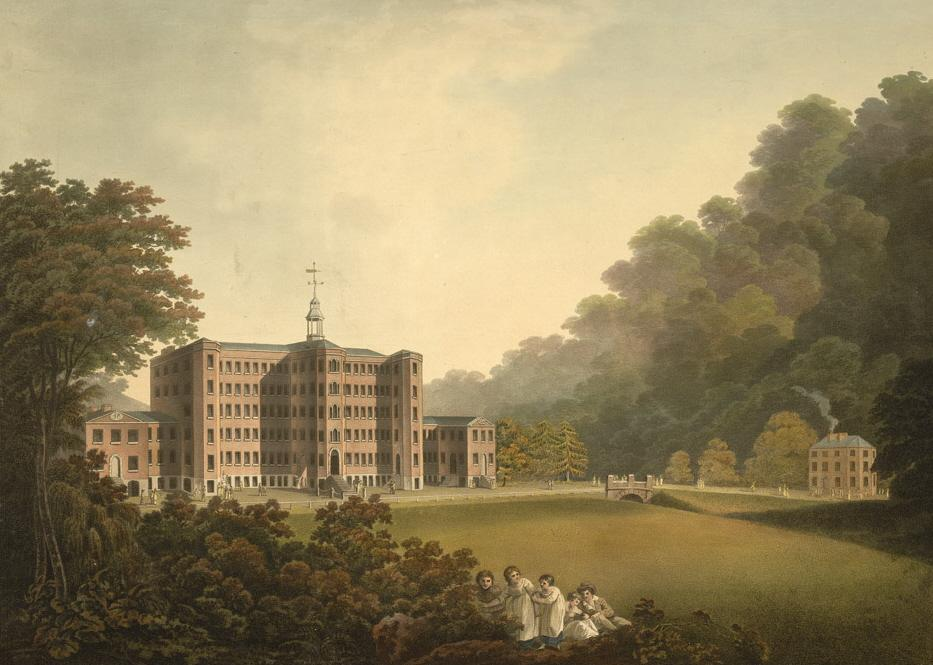
Mellor Mill (1802)

In 1790 he moved with his family to Manchester, a rapidly industrialising mill town that would soon become known as "Cottonopolis"—however, like much of the rest of northwest England at the time the city had no artistic institutions nor any kind of homegrown community of artists, making the move a financially risky one. In the town directories of the period, published every four years, Parry is consistently one of only three to six different artists listed through into the 1800s; at the time there was an expectation that painters in the British provinces would never stay in one place for too long because it would negatively affect their work. However, he secured the support of a number of wealthy patrons, including the Quaker cotton manufacturer David Holt and the merchant Otho Hulme, and became established enough in Manchester to remain there for the rest of his life.

Parry earned acclaim for his scenes of everyday domestic activity in the city and surrounding areas—he produced some of the only images of Manchester's pre-modern buildings and streetscapes during this transformative period, as well as documenting a number of the region's new factories, such as Mellor Mill in Marple. He also produced a number of etched book illustrations in a range of styles, from formal architectural drawings to whimsical folklore scenes.

His figure drawing in particular was noted as exceptional by contemporaries—he would venture out into the city and countryside, sketch particular people who caught his eye, and then incorporate them into his later paintings. This is reflected in his paintings of the Eccles Wakes—originally a pious medieval rushbearing festival, by the 19th century it had grown into a drunken three-day funfair featuring blood sports like bear-baiting. Parry produced a series of highly stylised paintings of the Wakes over a span of several years, depicting crowds of raucous partygoers in an Eccles that was more antiquated and idealised than in reality. His final depiction, Eccles Wakes Fair (1822)—commissioned by Thomas Kaye, editor of the Liverpool Courier—contained more than 200 individual figures, each drawn from life.

Parry continued to maintain links with Liverpool after his move to Manchester, being elected a member of the Liverpool Academy of Arts sometime after its founding in 1810. Due to Manchester's lack of gallery space and regular exhibitions (bar those arranged by commercial art dealers), Liverpool was also the nearest major institution where his works could be exhibited for the public.

=== Influence and legacy ===
Parry had a significant role in the development of Manchester as a centre of the arts due to both his mentorship of younger artists and his direct influence on their artistic styles, and he is often referred to as "the Father of Art in Manchester" (or variations thereon) by both his contemporaries and later historians.

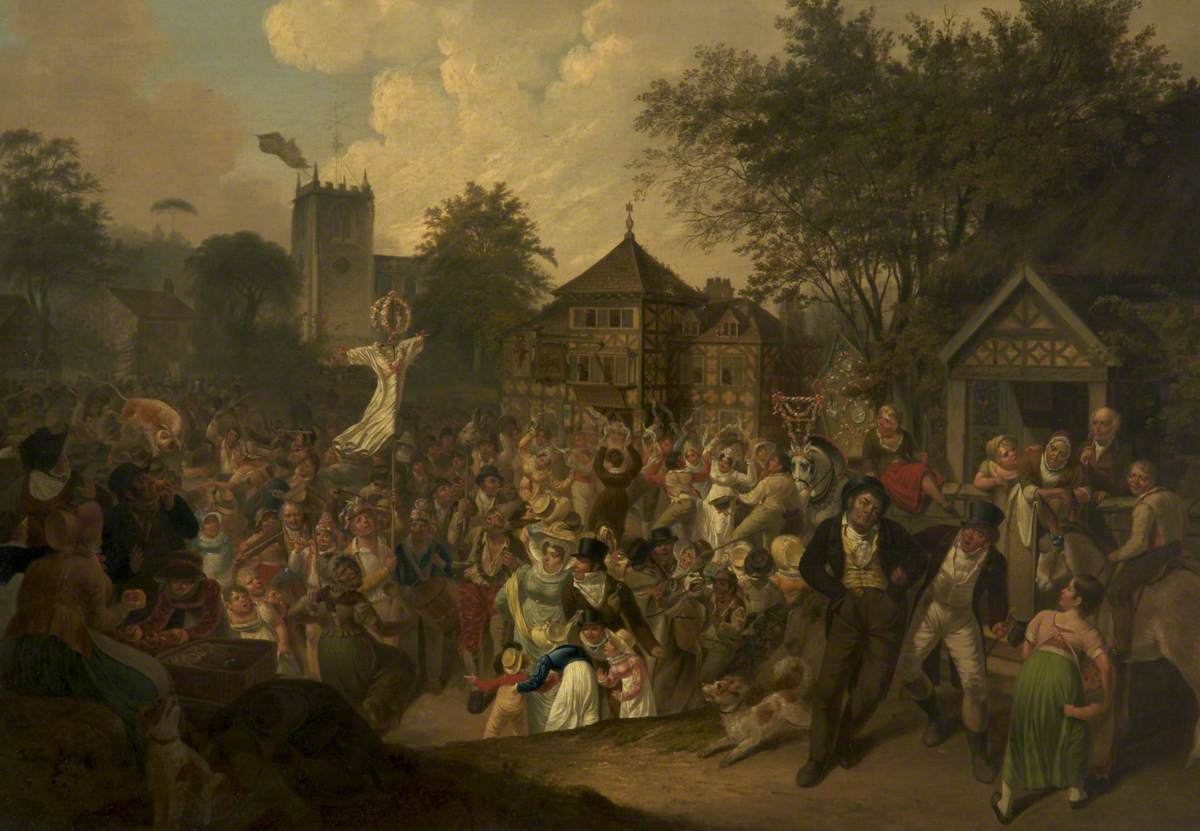
Eccles Wakes Fair (1822)

His success at settling in Manchester was unusual among his peers—other notable artists who moved to Manchester in the late 18th century included Charles Towne, William Tate, Richard Parkes Bonnington, and William Marshall Craig, but they all moved away again eventually. Meanwhile, homegrown artists like William Green and Joshua Shaw had to move to other cities (or even the United States, in Shaw's case) to find a stable career.

The only other artist to be considered synonymous with Manchester by the 1800s was John Rathbone, known in his day as "the Manchester Wilson." While both men taught members of the next generation of younger artists who came to the city in the 1800s and 1810s—such as John Ralston—Rathbone's death in 1807 prevented him from having as significant an influence on them as Parry.

By the 1820s, Manchester's art market had matured enough that dealers were bringing significant works from London and abroad to sell, and a generation of Manchester-based artists had emerged who felt that the city needed its own counterpart to London's Royal Academy and the Liverpool Academy of Art which could arrange regular exhibitions of new works as well as offer financial and fraternal support to artists in need. Parry's two youngest sons—James Parry and David Henry Parry—were both instrumental in the foundation of what would become the Royal Manchester Institution as part of the initial founding committee; the nickname "Old Parry" first appears around this time in response to his sons' emergence as artists in their own right, and the description of Parry as the "father of art" in the city is likely intended semi-literally.

The Institution would go on to hold Manchester's first non-commercial exhibition of paintings in 1827, featuring works from all three Parrys, and their works would continue to be included in future exhibitions in Manchester well into the 19th century. This includes the selection of several works by Parry for the Peel Park Local Art Exhibition of 1857; he was described in the visitor's guide as "the father of the Lancashire school of art."

Museums which today hold pieces by Parry in their collections include the Manchester Art Gallery, the British Museum, the Merseyside Maritime Museum, the Whitworth, the Lady Lever Art Gallery, the Salford Museum & Art Gallery, and the Shipley Art Gallery.

== Personal life ==
Parry married Esther Dunbovand at St. Paul's Church, Liverpool, on 26 January 1777. They had eight children, of whom five—a daughter (Ann) and four sons—survived to adulthood. His second surviving son, William, moved back to Liverpool to follow in his grandfather's footsteps by working as a boat pilot in the harbour.

He died on 11 May 1826 in Manchester after "a long and painful indisposition." His obituary, syndicated in a number of national newspapers, stated that "as an artist his powers were extensive; he painted portraits, landscapes, histories, and domestic scenes—in the latter his pictures possess extraordinary merit." His son David Henry Parry died only a few months later, on 15 September 1826.
