= James Parry (artist) =

British painter and engraver (1795-1871)

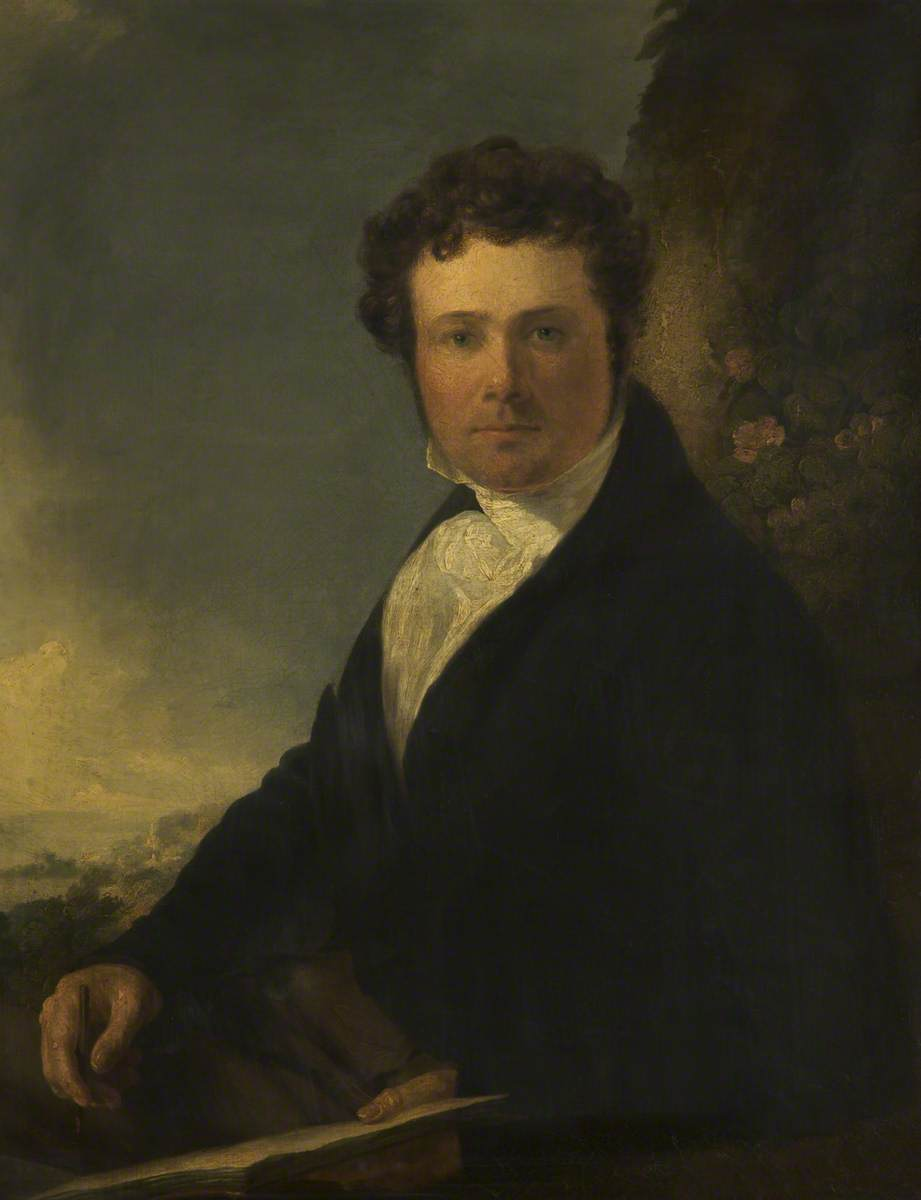
- Self-portrait, 1859
- Born: c. September 1795; Manchester, Lancashire, England
- Died: 14 July 1877 (aged 82); Manchester, Lancashire, England

James Parry (1795 – 1877) was a British painter and engraver.

He was the son of Joseph Parry and brother of David Henry Parry, both also artists.

== Early life ==
Parry was born in 1795, the youngest of eight children of Joseph Parry and Esther Dunbovand. His exact date of birth is unknown, but he was baptised on 9 September.

He was born in Manchester; his father, an artist, had moved there from Liverpool in 1790 to seek the patronage of the city's new class of wealthy industrialists and merchants. Joseph Parry was an influential figure within Manchester's early artistic community, being given the title of "the Father of Art in Manchester" by his contemporaries for his role as a mentor and teacher of the younger artists who followed in his wake—including James and his older brother David, who both studied in Joseph's studio.

== Career ==
Little is documented about the early careers of either Parry or his brother. He was described as "ingenious," and "a tall, good-looking man" with "a pleasing expression" by Samuel Hibbert-Ware in 1822. In James Butterworth's guide to Manchester of that same year, he notes that Parry, "an experienced painter and engraver," was living on Piccadilly, around the corner from fellow artist William Bradley. At some point between then and the 1841 census Parry moved to Grove Street, a small side road off Gartside Street; he would remain in close proximity to Gartside Street for most of the rest of his life, living at 5 Bridge Street by the time of the 1851 census, 18 Mulberry Street by the 1861 census, and 20 Young Street by the 1871 census.

As a painter he was strongly influenced by his father in style, choice of subject matter, and even signature (leading to confusion between the two by later collectors and antiquarians)—they each produced a wide range of portraits and landscapes, including marine and rural scenes, but they both became especially known for their depictions of the buildings and streets of Manchester as it transformed into a modern city during the Industrial Revolution. Parry was also a prolific engraver of both his own paintings and those of others; early notable commissions include Samuel Hibbert-Ware's A Description of the Shetland Islands (1822), John Corry's History of Lancashire (1825), and Rogerson & Sowler's Copperplates of Manchester Edifices (1818-1825)—of which Parry also drew four of the 15 total illustrations.

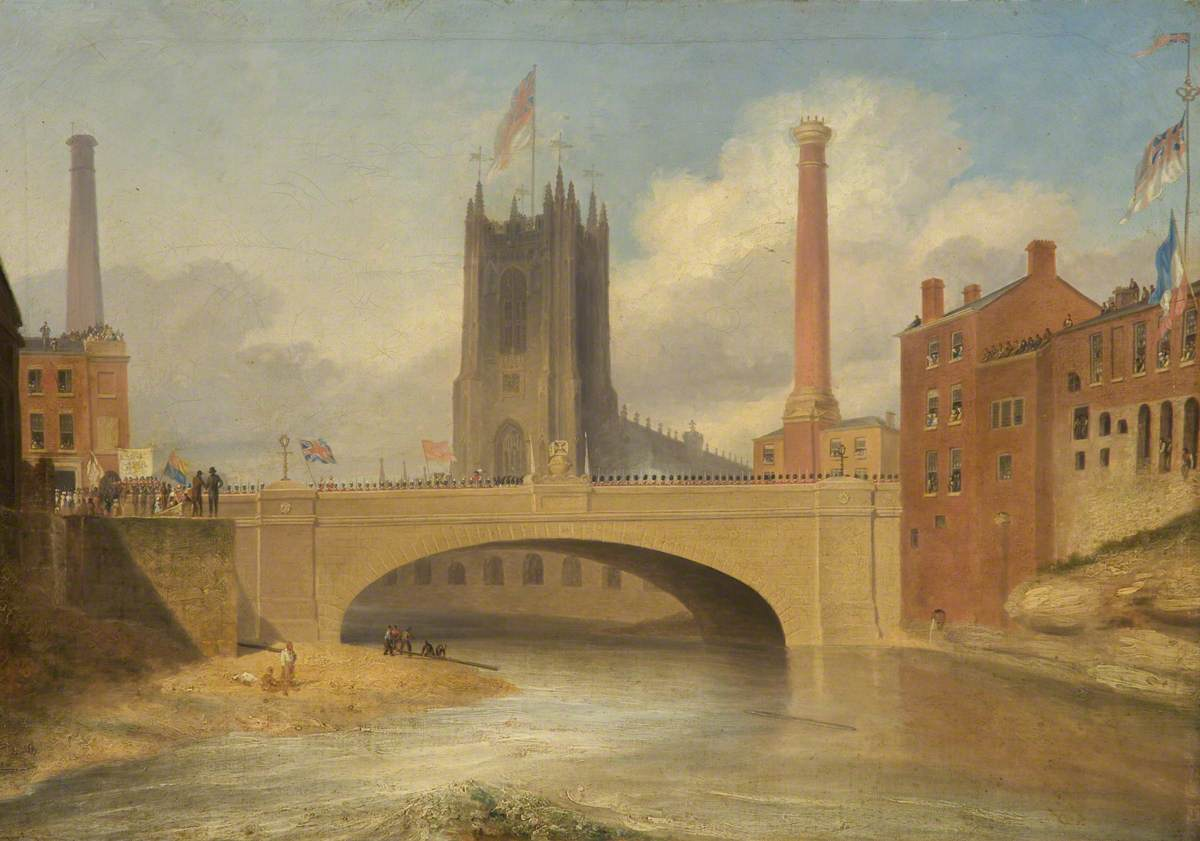
Victoria Bridge, Salford (1851)

In 1823, Parry's brother David visited an exhibition in Leeds which had been put on by a society of the city's artists, and he returned to Manchester determined to establish a similar organisation as a way of improving Manchester's cultural reputation. He gathered a group of fellow artists—including Parry, Arthur Perigal, and Charles Calvert—and together they formed the Associated Artists of Manchester, with the stated aim of establishing "the Manchester Institution for the Promotion of Literature, Science, and the Arts," in the vein of the Royal Academy in London. A plot of land was purchased on Mosley Street in 1825 for a building designed by Charles Barry; it would be completed by 1834, but in the meantime the Royal Manchester Institution held the city's first public exhibition of paintings in an art dealer's gallery at 83 Market Street in 1827.

In each of the Institution's annual exhibitions, into the early 1830s, there was a core group of Manchester-based artists—Parry, John Ralston, brothers Charles and Michael Pease Calvert, Henry Liverseege, Arthur Perigal, and Thomas Henry Illidge—whose works were always included. In the first exhibition, Parry submitted a portrait and a "coast scene strongly like William Collins," which "showed him at his best." He exhibited regularly at the Institution until 1856.

Parry was also one of the founding "nucleus" of painters, sculptors, and architects who formed "the Manchester Artists" in 1830, a "fraternity society" which was intended to represent their collective interests when dealing with the governors of the Royal Manchester Institution.

In 1857, a new wing was opened at the Salford Free Museum & Library (now the Salford Museum & Art Gallery) in Peel Park, and a group of local artists decided to hold an exhibition of more than 650 works produced in Manchester and the surrounding areas as a counterweight to the major international Art Treasures of Great Britain Exhibition nearby. The Peel Park Local Art Exhibition included a number of works by the generation of artists who had helped found the Royal Manchester Institution—including Parry, his father, and his brother—and the group's leader, Robert Crozier, asked critic G. W. Anthony to author the exhibition's catalogue. Parry supplied Anthony with the information used for the biographies of any artists who had died in the intervening years, with the exceptions of Ralston, Liverseege and Henry Whyatt (each of whom Anthony had known personally); Parry also donated a self-portrait to the museum in 1859 for its permanent collection. The success of the exhibition led to the founding of the Manchester Academy of Fine Arts in 1859 as a school which could continue to develop the city's homegrown artistic talent.

== Later life and death ==
Parry never married, nor had children; he was living alone as late as the 1871 census, listed as "unmarried". According to Robert Crozier (writing in 1883) Parry was a regular of the Crown & Anchor pub on Cateaton Street, where he sat in the same chair each evening beneath a portrait which had been paid for by a group of his admirers—the dedication to Parry on the back, dated 6 November 1863, said that they had "frequently had the opportunity of meeting you and enjoying the pleasure of your conversation and society [and] have been anxious to obtain a portrait of you which shall Perpetually recall the past pleasure and preserve the memory of one we so highly esteem."

However, Crozier also says that Parry's final years were difficult, and he was an inmate of the New Bridge Street workhouse when he died on 14 July 1877; "senile decay" was recorded as his cause of death. By the time of his death he had fallen into obscurity, and even his extended family seems to have been unsure as to his fate—his entry in the Dictionary of National Biography, published in 1895 and reliant on David Henry Parry's grandson as a primary source, speculates (incorrectly) that he died in 1871.

His personal papers—including letters, notebooks, and sketchbooks—are held in the archives of Manchester Central Library. Several of his paintings are in the Salford Museum & Art Gallery.
