= George Freeman (artist) =

American artist

- Born: 21 April 1789; Spring Hill, Connecticut, United States
- Died: 7 March 1868 (aged 78); Hartford, Connecticut, United States
- Known for: Miniature portraits

George Freeman (1789 – 1868) was an American artist who painted portraits and miniatures. He was based in the United Kingdom for nearly a third of his life, and most of his career.

He was well-respected in his day, receiving aristocratic and even royal patronage in the U.K.

== Early life and education ==
Freeman was born in Spring Hill, Connecticut, on 21 April 1789. He was the son of a farmer, but as a sickly child he was more interested in reading and sketching than agricultural work, and in 1808 he moved with his sister and brother-in-law to Albany as he pursued a career as a painter.

Some sources state that he moved to London in 1813, and he studied miniature painting there and in Paris, but he is also recorded as seeking work in Montreal in 1816. He had settled in the U.K. by 1817 at the latest, where he established himself as a professional painter for the next two decades.

== Art ==
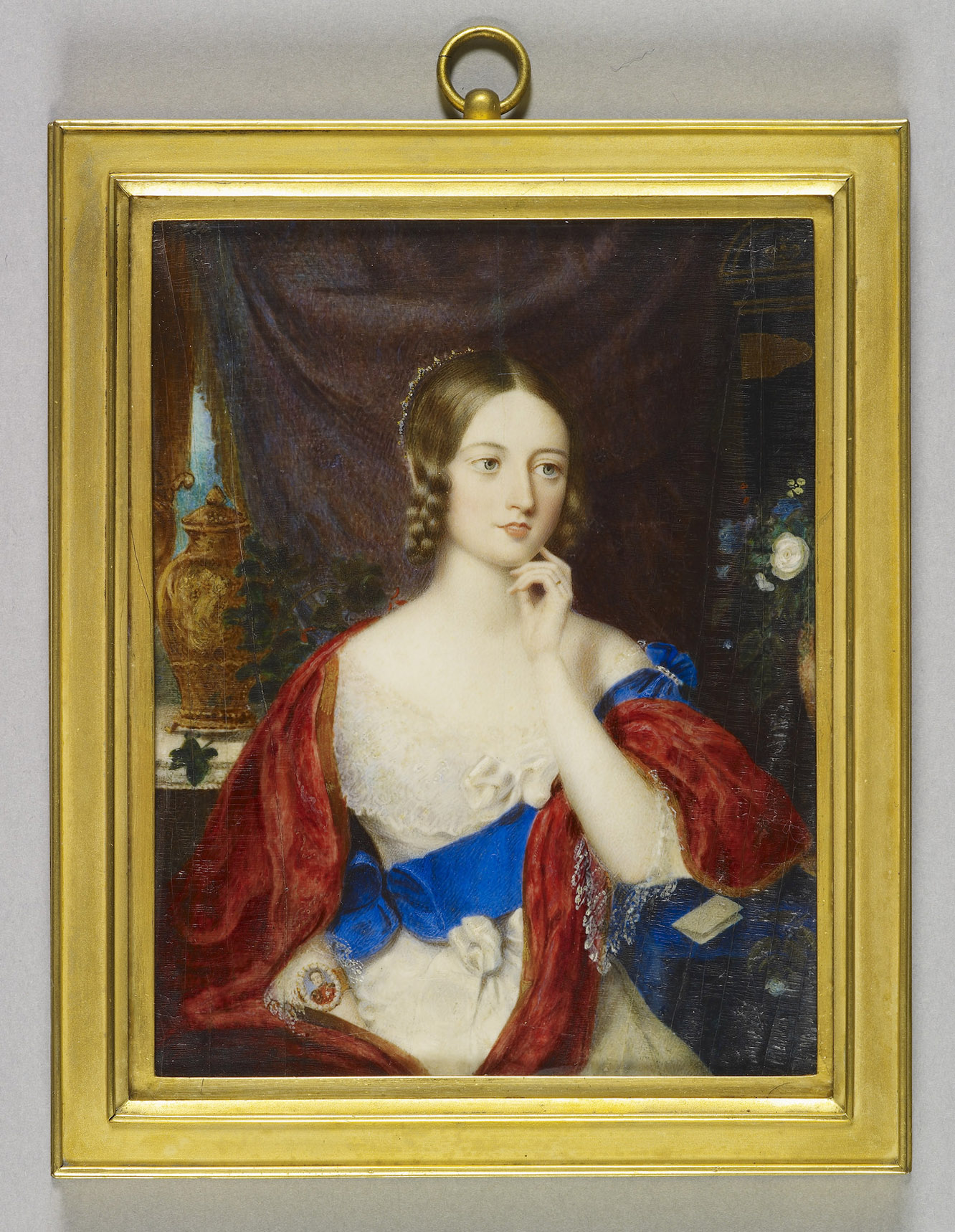
Freeman's 1841 miniature of Queen Victoria (14.1 x 11.2 cm, oil on canvas).

Freeman specialized in miniature portraits—typically comparable in size to a modern 4x6 inch photographic print, often small enough to be held in a locket or brooch, and usually (but not always) painted onto either porcelain or ivory rather than canvas. Miniature painters often lived an itinerant lifestyle, traveling with their tools and supplies to seek out new clientele, and, while he mostly lived in London, Freeman is recorded as also having spent time living in both Manchester and Bath during the 1820s and 1830s. Letters written by both Freeman and his wife to family back home in the U.S. describe a successful career with a number of aristocratic clients, and an impressive reputation which made him one of the few artists whom members of the British Royal Family would pose for.

Notable people who sat for portraits by Freeman include:

- Queen Victoria
- Prince Albert
- William IV
- President John Tyler
- President Martin van Buren
- Composer Henry Bishop
- Scottish artist John Ralston
- Members of the Biddle family of Philadelphia
- Members of the Brown family of Rhode Island

His work was frequently exhibited at the Royal Academy in London during his time in the U.K.

== Later life and death ==
Freeman moved back to the U.S. in 1837, though he returned to the U.K. in 1841 to paint Queen Victoria. He worked in Philadelphia, Boston, and New York City for a short time after his permanent return to the U.S.—when he painted many of his portraits of American figures, such as President Tyler—before eventually retiring to a suburb of New York City.

He died in Hartford, Connecticut on 7 March 1868. His daughter was the painter and poet Mary Freeman Goldbeck, wife of the composer Robert Goldbeck and (through their son William Freeman Goldbeck) grandmother of Hollywood screenwriter, director, and producer Willis Goldbeck.
