= Charles Towne (artist) =

English painter

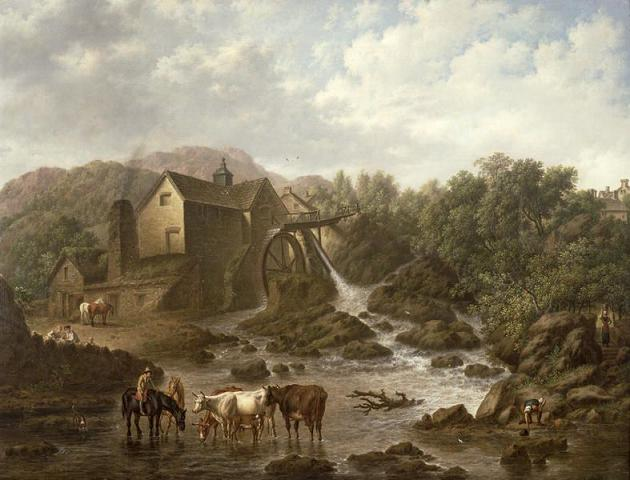
River scene with overshot mill (1833)

Charles Towne (1763–1840) was an English painter of landscapes, horses and other animals, horse-racing and hunting scenes.

== Life ==
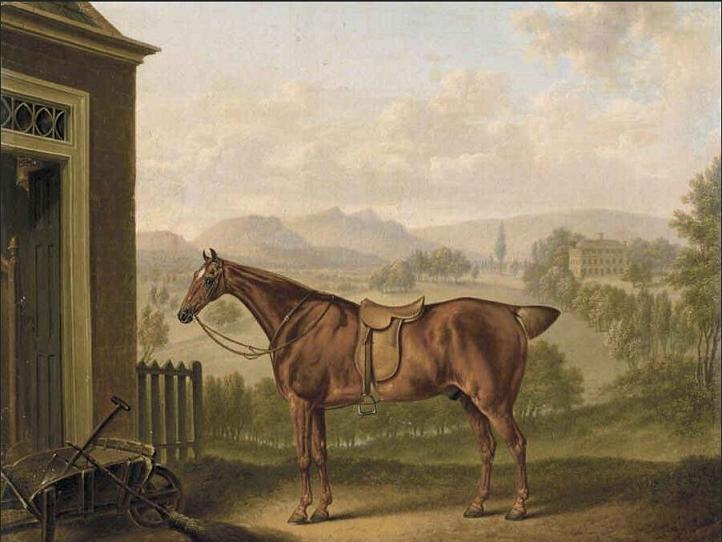
A saddled chestnut hunter in a landscape

Towne was born in Wigan, the son of Richard Town, a portrait-painter from Liverpool, and his wife Mary. His talent for art was apparent from a young age and he received some training from landscape painter John Rathbone in Leeds. He then worked as a coach and ornamental painter with his brother in Liverpool, and also worked for a time in Lancaster and Manchester. In 1785 he married Margaret Harrison, a widow.

In 1787 Towne exhibited a small landscape in an exhibition in Liverpool. By the 1790s he was an established animal painter with a style reminiscent of Stubbs. He lived in London from 1799 to 1804 during which time he exhibited at the Royal Academy. He also added a final 'e' to his name. He became a friend of fellow artists George Morland and De Loutherbourg.

Between 1799 and 1823 he exhibited twelve works at the Royal Academy and four at the British Institution. He returned to Liverpool in 1810, and was a founder member of the Liverpool Academy, becoming vice-president in 1812–13, and exhibiting his work there for several years on and off. He resided in Liverpool until 1837, when he apparently returned to London, Towne died at Norton Street Islington Liverpool 1840.

== Work ==
Towne painted landscapes and animals, and obtained great celebrity in Lancashire and Cheshire by his portraits of horses, dogs, and cattle. Many of his pictures were small, but occasionally he ventured into landscapes with cattle of larger size. He also painted in watercolour, and was a candidate for admission to the Watercolour Society in 1809. His work was reasonably well regarded by his contemporary Joseph Farrington, though he also noted that Towne was a man of "coarse, debased manners and conversation". According to artist W. S. Sparrow, "his landscapes are minutely detailed and have a Dutch mannerism; animals and figures are put in with diligent and affectionate care". However the Dictionary of National Biography commented that his work "though carefully drawn" was "wanting in spirit and originality".

He painted "Old Billy", the longest-living horse on record, who pulled barges on the canals.
