= David Henry Parry =

British portrait painter (1793–1826)

- Born: 7 June 1793; Manchester, Lancashire
- Died: 15 September 1826 (aged 33); London

David Henry Parry (1793 – 1826) was a British portrait painter. He was the son of Joseph Parry and brother of James Parry, both also artists.

A native of Manchester, he was the "founding father" of the city's first cultural institution—the Royal Manchester Institution.

== Early life ==
Parry was born on 7 June 1783, the second-youngest of the biological children of Joseph and Esther Parry. He was born in Manchester; his father, an artist, had moved there from Liverpool in 1790 to seek the patronage of the city's new class of wealthy industrialists and merchants. Joseph Parry was an influential figure within Manchester's early artistic community, being given the title of "the Father of Art in Manchester" by his contemporaries for his role as a mentor and teacher of the younger artists who followed in his wake—including both David and his younger brother James, who studied in Joseph's studio.

== Career ==
Parry specialised in portraits, painting in both oils and watercolours. His early career is poorly documented, but pieces by Parry and his brother began appearing in the 1810s; when he died, Parry was described as having developed an impressive reputation, and he was beginning to attract national patronage. In an 1822 guide to Manchester, James Butterworth described Parry as an "eminent portrait painter" whose works "possess in themselves, a voice and an utterance superior to the eloquent praise that could be bestowed by Cicero: the common talent of a common artist may sometimes require a compliment, through the medium of the press, to bring them into more general notice; but his works (in my humble opinion) are his own panegyrist."

At the dawn of the 19th century several of the industrialising cities of Northern England had started to develop their first self-sustaining artistic communities, with institutions similar to London's Royal Academy of Art—but Manchester was a conspicuous laggard relative to peer cities like Liverpool and Birmingham, with a reputation for philistinism that would endure well into the Victorian era. This began to change in 1823, when Parry and fellow artist Frank Stone (along with their mutual friend William Brigham, a local businessman) visited an exhibition in Leeds put on by the Northern Society for the Encouragement of the Fine Arts, which had been formed by Leeds' artists in the 1800s as a way of collectively soliciting patronage from the city's wealthy industrialists. Inspired, they returned home and together with a small group of other local artists—including James Parry, Arthur Perigal, and Charles Calvert—formed a new society called the Associated Artists of Manchester.

Over the following months the group secured support from prominent local figures (including Sir Oswald Mosley), elected a board of governors, and agreed on a primary objective: the establishment of "the Manchester Institution for the Promotion of Literature, Science, and the Arts," containing art galleries (for annual exhibitions of works by local artists), lecture theatres, a library, and research laboratories. After raising £21,100 (roughly £1.6m in 2023 adjusted for inflation) a plot of land was purchased on Mosley Street in 1825, and construction started on a building designed by Charles Barry which would be completed by 1834. In the meantime, the newly christened Royal Manchester Institution held Manchester's first public exhibition of paintings in an art dealer's gallery on Market Street in 1827.

However, Parry did not live to see this exhibition—in 1826 he moved to London after securing commissions there, but died only a few months later at the age of 33. His brother James continued to be an important member of Manchester's artistic community for several decades, but Parry's relatively short career meant that he soon faded from memory, and today only one of his paintings—The Misses Heywood (1817)—is in the permanent collection of a British art museum (though the National Portrait Gallery has a small number of mezzotint prints which were copied from some of Parry's original portraits). Parry's reputation is now largely tied to the origin story of the Royal Manchester Institution—for example, Dennis Child's Painters in the Northern Counties of England and Wales (1994), a standard reference text used by historians and auction houses for identifying works produced by artists working pre-1940, describes Parry as the Institution's "founding father."

== Personal life ==
Parry married Elizabeth Smallwood in 1816; they had three sons. The family moved to London in May 1826, presumably shortly after the death of Joseph Parry on 11 May after a long illness. Parry himself then died on 15 September 1826. His death was noted in Manchester's local newspapers, which described him as "an artist of considerable local celebrity [who] was one of the original projectors of our Royal Institution, and bade fair to hold an exalted rank in his profession."

He was buried at St. Martin-in-the-Fields in London, but the church's burial ground was lost in the mid-19th century as it became part of the route of Duncannon Street, which was built to provide access to newly constructed Trafalgar Square.

Parry's youngest son, wool merchant Charles James Parry, had minor success as a landscape painter, and his two sons were also artists. One of them—David Henry Parry, a military painter and writer named after his grandfather—was the primary source for much of the information in the 1895 Dictionary of National Biography entry on Joseph Parry and his sons, and his paintings are sometimes mistakenly attributed to his grandfather.
