= James Kennedy (British politician) =

British Member of Parliament

James Kennedy (1798–1859) was a British Member of Parliament.

He was a barrister and art critic, founding Library of the Fine Arts magazine in 1831. However, he stepped down as its editor and owner in October 1832 after his selection as a Radical candidate for the constituency of Tiverton, Devon in that year's general election.

Kennedy's electoral victory in the seat was challenged by the Whigs, who petitioned that his nomination at the time had not been strictly legal, due to the property requirements. The petition led to his election being declared void, and his having to fight a further by-election in May 1833, which he won against the Whig contender Benjamin Wood, who had been the third placed candidate in the 1832 general election.

After fighting again to retain his seat at the general election in February 1835, Kennedy left Parliament in July, "Taking the Chiltern Hundreds" and retiring conveniently at a time when Viscount Palmerston found himself without a seat in Parliament and forcing a by-election which Palmerston won comfortably. In Palmerston's Biography by K. Bourne it is reported that "The impecunious Kennedy" was paid £2000 for vacating the seat.

Kennedy was then appointed (by Palmerston) as a judge to the joint British and Spanish Mixed Court of Justice in Havana in post from 1837 to 1839.

Parliament of the United Kingdom
Preceded by Spencer; Granville Dudley Ryder	Member of Parliament for Tiverton; 1831 – 1835; With: John Heathcoat	Succeeded by John Heathcoat; Viscount Palmerston
