= Old Billy =

Longest-living horse on record

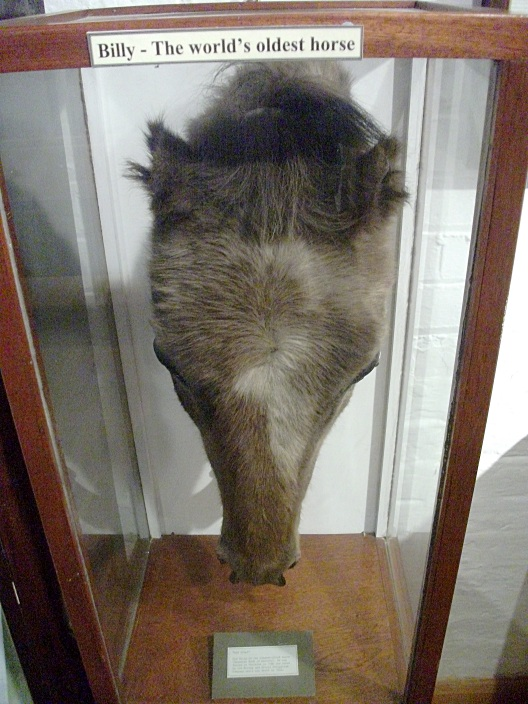
- Billy's taxidermied head, on display in Bedford Museum
- Species: Equus ferus caballus
- Sex: Male
- Born: 1760; Woolston, Cheshire, England
- Died: 27 November 1822 (aged 62); Everton, Liverpool, England
- Occupation: Barge horse
- Known for: Oldest horse on record

Old Billy (also called Billy or Ol' Billy) was the longest-living horse on record, verified to have lived 62 years. He was born in Woolston, Cheshire, England, in 1760, and died on 27 November 1822. The average lifespan of a horse is 25 years.

Billy was a barge horse, pulling barges along canals. He was described as resembling a large cob/shire horse, brown in color with a white blaze, and less than 15 hands high.

== Biography ==
Billy was born at Wild Grave Farm in Woolston, Cheshire, in 1760. At 2 years old, his training as a barge horse began. Very shortly after, at either 2 or 3 years of age, he was purchased by the Mersey and Irwell Navigation Company, for whom he worked until his retirement. His age at retirement is disputed; Sir Lionel Earle, a descendant of William, claimed that Old Billy retired at 40, while two other accounts claim he was 59. Nevertheless, more than half of his life was spent working, and he was still working even after his back became bent and his bones became visible through his skin.

After Old Billy's retirement, he was moved to the Warrington, Cheshire estate of William Earle, director of the Mersey and Irwell Navigation Company. In his final years, he was kept inside during the winter and fed mashed food. He became a local celebrity, participating in celebrations of King George IV's coronation and receiving regular visitors.

Old Billy died on 27 November 1822. Though an 1846 book states his age at death to be 76, it is generally agreed that he was in fact 62. In horse years, Billy would be the equivalent of 248 human years.

== Legacy ==
In 1824, two years after his death, Old Billy's skull was given to the Manchester Museum, where it resides to this day. Billy's teeth were remarkably worn down, given his age; an analysis by farrier Thomas Brown found that the fifth and sixth molars were nearly worn down completely, and that other molars were just half an inch above the gums. Shortly before death, he had been described as having very long, though sound, teeth.

Old Billy, a Draught Horse, Aged 62 (1823), by Charles Towne

A lithograph shows Old Billy with Squire Henry Harrison, who had "known the animal for fifty-nine years", and a portrait of him is held at the Warrington Museum & Art Gallery. Charles Towne produced an oil painting of Billy shortly before the horse's death, which is now in the Paul Mellon Collection at Yale.

Billy's taxidermied head resided at the Bedford Art Gallery & Museum until July 2024, when it was returned to Warrington. A team of local artists established a 'Bring Back Old Billy Committee', which sought successfully to have the head present at the Warrington Arts Festival.

Billy's life and long age have inspired a 2023 children's book, and he is mentioned in the song "My Barn My Rules" by HorsegiirL, which is also dedicated to him.

== See also ==
- List of longest-living organisms
- List of historical horses
