= Library of the Fine Arts =

Library of the Fine Arts was an English monthly magazine of critical essays on painting, sculpture, architecture, and engraving, first published in February 1831. Its name changed to Arnold's Library of the Fine Arts in November 1832, and then changed again to Arnold's Magazine of the Fine Arts and Journal of Literature and Science in May 1833.

Its founder and editor was barrister James Kennedy, writing under the pseudonym "J.K." in early issues. Kennedy stood down as editor and owner after the October 1832 edition after he was selected as a Radical candidate for the constituency of Tiverton in that year's general election, precipitating the magazine's renaming by its publisher, M. Arnold, with a "round table of artists and amateurs" as its new editorial team. Kennedy won his election to Parliament and contributed a final essay—containing his "thoughts on the present state of the fine arts in Great Britain, with suggestions for their advancement"—in June 1833, and his true identity was revealed by the publisher as "J. Kennedy M.P." in an advertisement for that issue.

Contributors to the magazine were typically pseudonymous, signing their work with their initials only, though full names were given to figures such as Henry Fuseli and John Opie when publishing transcriptions of their public lectures.

The magazine ceased publication after its July 1834 issue.

== Links ==
Library of the Fine Arts:

- Volume I (February 1831-July 1831)
- Volume II (August 1831-December 1831)
- Volume III (January 1832-June 1832)
- Volume IV (July 1832-October 1832)

Arnold's Library of the Fine Arts and Arnold's Magazine of the Fine Arts and Journal of Literature and Science:

- Volume I:
  - November 1832
  - December 1832
  - January 1833
  - February 1833
  - March 1833
  - April 1833
- Volume II:
  - May 1833
  - June 1833
  - July 1833
  - August 1833
  - September 1833
  - October 1833
- Volume III (November 1833-April 1834)
- Volume IV (May 1834-July 1834)
