= Mellor Mill =

Former cotton mill in Marple, England

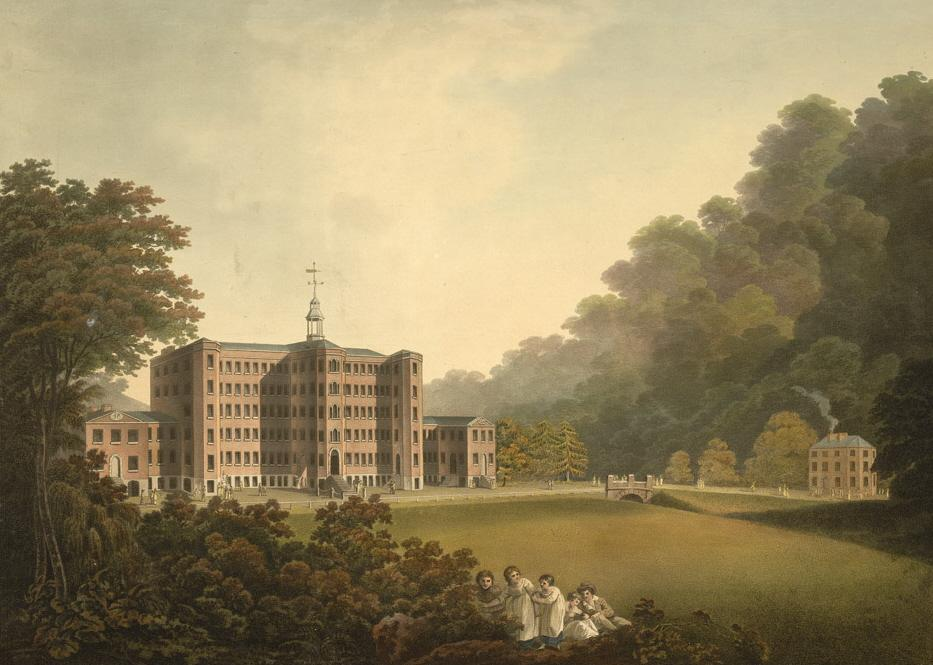
- The mill in 1802

- Location in Greater Manchester

Cotton
- Spindles: 10,080

Arkwright Spinning
- Current status: Destroyed by fire
- Location: Marple, England
- Coordinates: 53.387°N 2.047°W

Construction
- Completed: 1793
- Employees: 550 (60 Parish apprentices)
- Destroyed: 1892
- Floor count: 6

Water Power
- Wheels: 2
- Diameter / width of water wheel: 22 feet (6.7 m) (both) / 17 feet (5.2 m) (widest)

Equipment
- Cotton count: 20s-36s
- Mule Frames: 10,080

Mellor Mill, also known as Bottom's Mill, was a six-storey cotton mill in Marple (historically part of Cheshire, now in Greater Manchester) built by Samuel Oldknow in 1793. This was a six-storey, 42-foot (13 m) wide and 210-foot (64 m) long mill with additional three-storey wings making it 400 feet (120 m) in all. The mill was built for Samuel Oldknow and used to spin coarse counts. It was originally driven by the Wellington water wheel. The River Goyt, and with it the then county boundary between Derbyshire and Cheshire was diverted and a weir built, the leat fed a millpond that in later times was named the Roman Lakes. This in turn fed a second mill pond along with water from reservoir in Linnet Clough. Supplementary power was provided by a second exterior wheel known as the Waterloo wheel. The mill reached its peak production in 1804, when 10,080 spindles were operating and around 550 people were employed. It was destroyed by fire in 1892.

== Location ==
The mill was built beside the River Goyt in the parishes of Mellor and Marple in what was historically part of Cheshire and is now within Greater Manchester. The River Goyt was the boundary between Derbyshire and Cheshire. To provide water for the two wheels the Goyt was diverted and canals and reservoirs built. The water reservoirs for the mill, are now called the Roman Lakes. The foundations of the mill remain though nothing can be seen above ground.

== History ==
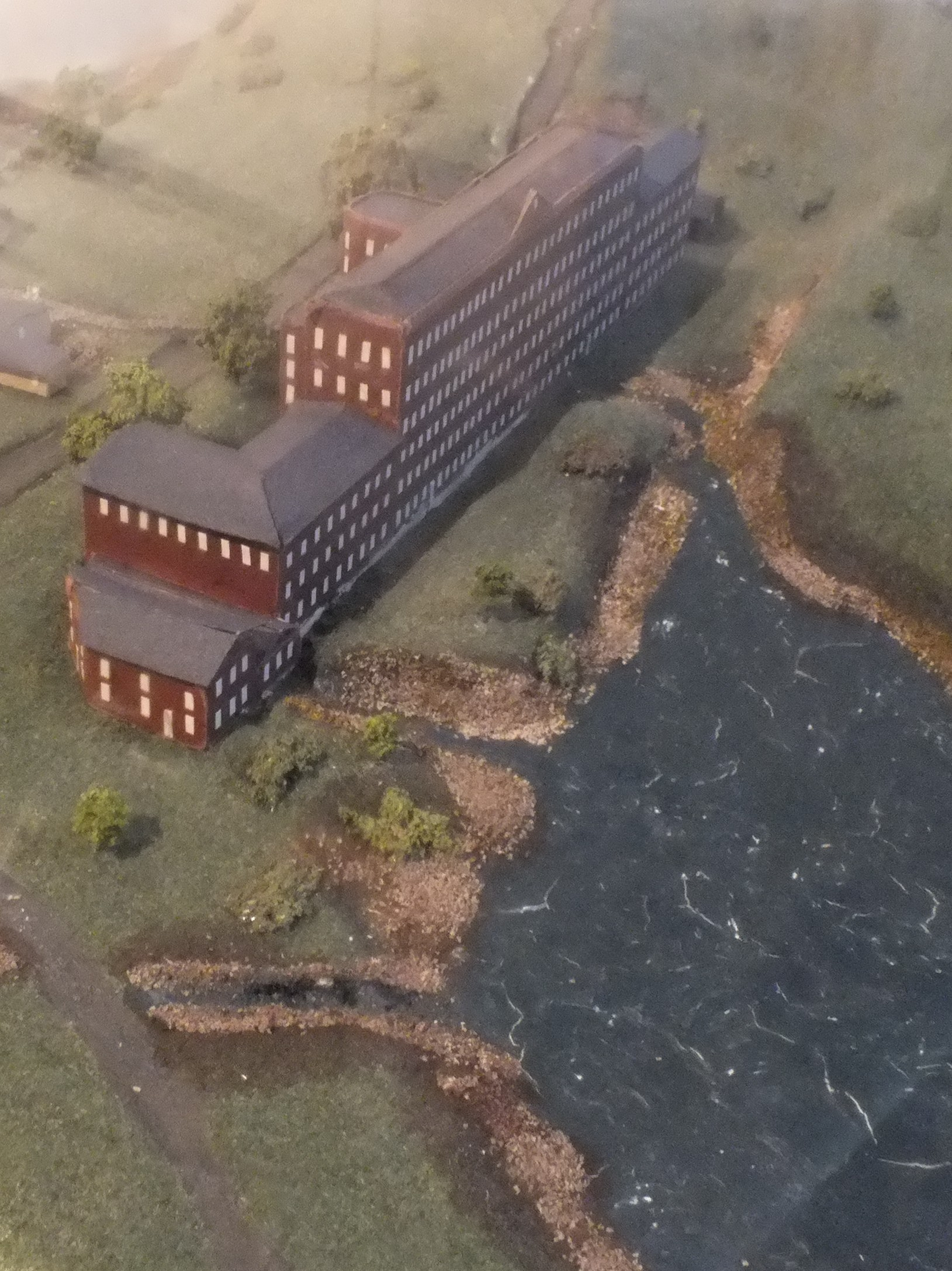
A model of Mellor Mill and the 'Roman Lakes'

Samuel Oldknow was a significant businessman and mill owner in Mellor during the Industrial Revolution. He had business interests in Stockport, Heaton Mersey and Anderton. In 1787 started to amass land in Mellor and Marple, buying in three adjoining estates. He commenced building the mill, financing it on credit secured on his reputation and the other mills. He was underwritten by loans from Arkwright, and attempted to form a partnership with Peter Drinkwater being engaged to his daughter. The financial crisis of 1792-1793 hit him badly and he sold off his other interests concentrating on completing this mill. The engagement was broken off, and he remained in debt to Arkwright.

He finished the mill in 1795, but was about to declare bankruptcy in 1797. Arkwright intervened and formed a partnership with him, absorbing the debt leaving Oldknow to manage the mill and the estate. When the partnership dissolved in 1805, the estate was worth £160,584 but the debts remained at £156,333. On Oldknow's death, in 1828 the estate and mill passed to Arkwright.

Since 1824, the mill had been managed by John Clayton, Oldknow's half-brother, and in 1828 Arkright (jun) allowed him to remain in the mill managers house, and take over the manufacturing. In those time 'mill' referred to the company that worked in the building not just the building itself. So John Clayton and Co took over the mill. In 1860 two steam engines and boilers were installed in a separate building to the north. The main mill-building was destroyed by fire in 1892, (Note: Cheshire County News report on the burning of the Mill: ...."Immense tongues of fire were belching forth from the windows. Higher and higher they leaped and blazed, the building and its environs being encircled with a halo of crimson light. A message was despatched to Marple and Compstall fire brigade, but they arrived too late to be of any practical service. The spectacle when the fire was at its height was a splendid but awe-inspiring one. The entire mass of buildings, which covers half an acre in area, was in gigantic blaze, brilliantly illuminating the district. Huge columns of smoke ascended into the heavens and hung in the form of a dense canopy over the burning building. One by one the floors fell in with a deafening crash and the machinery clanged together like the roar of artillery. Then the roof with one gigantic swoop collapsed, falling through the practically demolished building with a thunderous smash, amidst the shrieks of the by-standers, for all the village was now awake. The mill girls with their shawls over their heads, the children clinging, terrified, to their mother's dresses, and the men who had been striving to render what little assistance there was in their power, were all gazing at the burning pile......") but many outbuildings survived. Excavation of one of these in 1921, a coach-house, revealed a cache of Oldknow's papers; and from these Unwin researched and published the book referred to below.

=== Parish apprentices ===
Oldknow was experienced at running spinning mills, and offered work to the few women living in the area, but many of his first workers were parish apprentices. Economically it made sense, on average an apprentice cost 4/0d a week to maintain while a mill hand cost 4/8d. In May 1791 he was boarding two boys at 4/6d a week. In November 1795 he made enquiries through a friend to the Parish of Clerkenwell for a supply of children. He was informed in December that 40 to 50 of mixed sexes were available, and in January 1796 he is told that 35 boys and 35 girls had been selected. The parish beadle would accompany them north. When news spread, he was offered other children by other parishes. The maximum number of apprentices was reached in 1797 to 1801. Material in the records suggest that apprentices coming out of time remained in Oldknow's service. Robert Blincoe confirmed that Oldknow was a humane employer and his apprentices were contented and healthy.

== Architecture ==
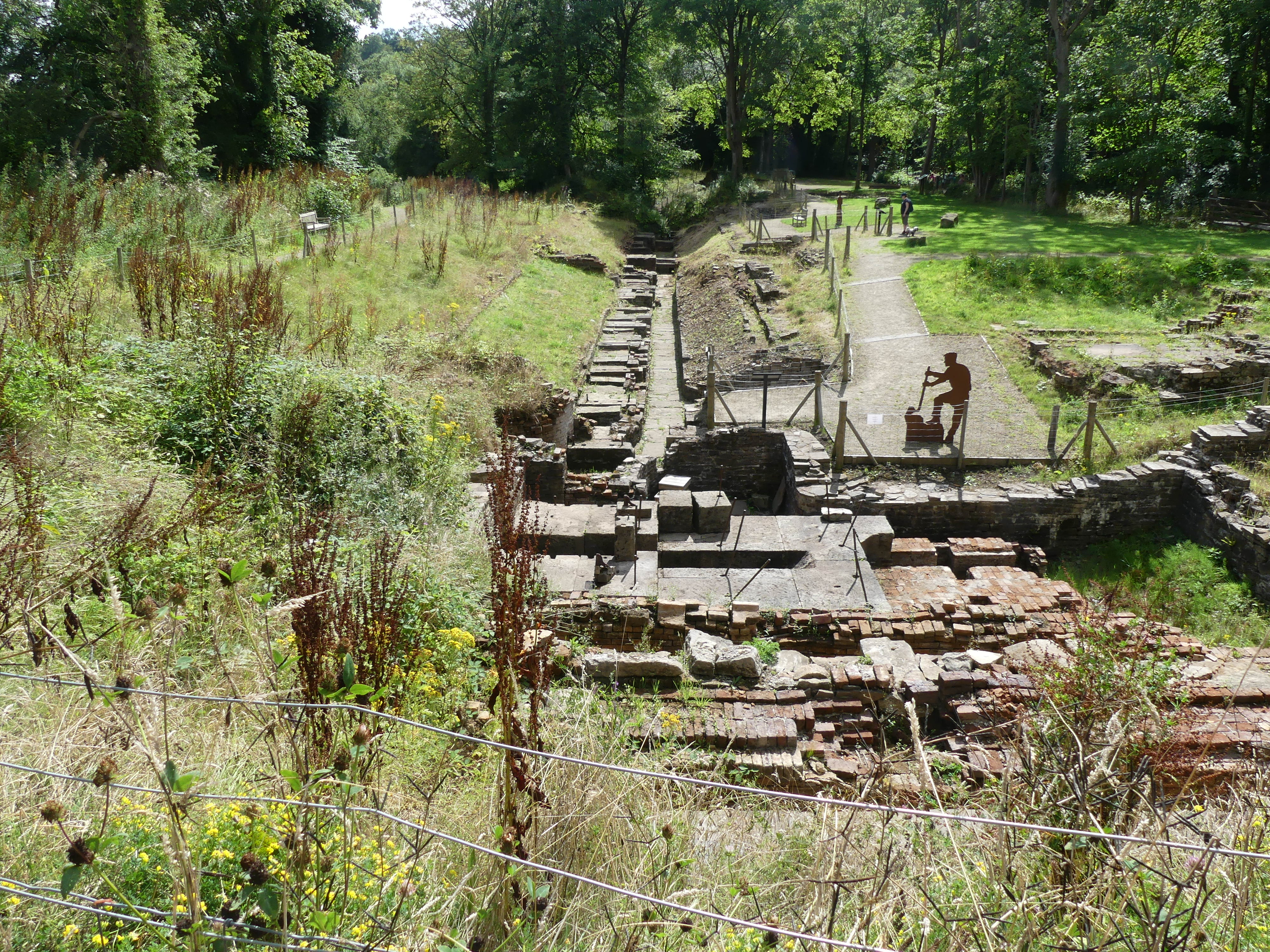
The excavated remains of Mellor Mill in 2022

The mill had six storeys, and was 42 feet (13 m) wide and 210 feet (64 m) long, with additional three-storey wings giving a total length of 400 feet (120 m). The mill was built for Samuel Oldknow and used to spin coarse counts. It was originally driven by the Wellington waterwheel. The River Goyt, and the Derbyshire–Cheshire county boundary that then followed it, was diverted and a weir built. The leat fed a millpond that in later times was named the Roman Lakes. This in turn fed a second millpond along with water from a reservoir in Linnet Clough. Supplementary power was provided by a second exterior wheel known as the Waterloo Wheel. The mill reached its peak production in 1804, when 10,080 spindles were operating and around 550 people were employed.

In an 1867 plan, Mellor Mill was described as brick built and slated, consisting of a main building seven storeys high which included the attic with four rooms of 25 bays each, and three rooms of 49 bays. Each bay was 7 ft. 10in. There were separate waste and cotton rooms, warehousing, storerooms and a counting house.

=== Power ===
==== The Wellington Wheel ====
The Wellington Wheel was located in a wheelpit in a basement below the central entrance to the mill. It was a breastshot wheel, 22 feet (6.7 m) in diameter and 17 feet (5.2 m) in width. Water from the mill lodge on the southern elevation of the mill fed the wheel via a leat that entered the mill at ground level.

==== The Waterloo Wheel ====
The Waterloo Wheel was built at a later date, probably in 1815. Water exited the Wellington Wheel pit to the exterior breastshot Waterloo Wheel, which was 22 feet (6.7 m) in diameter but narrower. Power was transmitted to the mill and outbuildings through a tunnel. As the tail race was lower than the River Goyt, water went via a tunnel 600 metres (2,000 ft) further downstream at which point the river had dropped sufficiently in height.

A further waterwheel is known to have supplied power to a stone-built corn mill off the southwestern gable of the mill. Together the three wheels raised 120 H.P.

==== Supplementary steam engines ====
Two steam engines were added later, each of 20 (nominal) H.P., by Goodfellow, of Hyde.

=== Equipment ===
Originally water frames, then throstles. The machinery comprised 23,000 throstle spindles by Wren & Hopkinson, with a full complement of preparation machines by Parr, Curtis & Madely, of Manchester and a hoist by Hughes & Wren.

== See also ==
- List of mills in Stockport
