= George Wilfred Anthony =

British painter

George Wilfred Anthony (1810 – 14 November 1859) was an English landscape painter, art teacher and art critic.

== Life ==
He was born in Manchester, a cousin of Henry Mark Anthony, studied landscape painting under John Ralston (1789–1833), and afterwards under J. V. Barber of Birmingham. He moved to Preston, then Wigan, finally settling in Manchester again as a teacher of art; he also ran a shop selling stationery. Between 1827 and 1859 he exhibited 60 pictures, mostly watercolour landscapes, at the Royal Manchester Institution (RMI). He was also an art-critic for the Manchester Guardian, writing under the pseudonym "Gabriel Tinto". He was one of the executors of the will of the local painter Henry Liverseege.

He died in Manchester on 14 November 1859, aged 49.
