= John Rathbone (artist) =

English painter

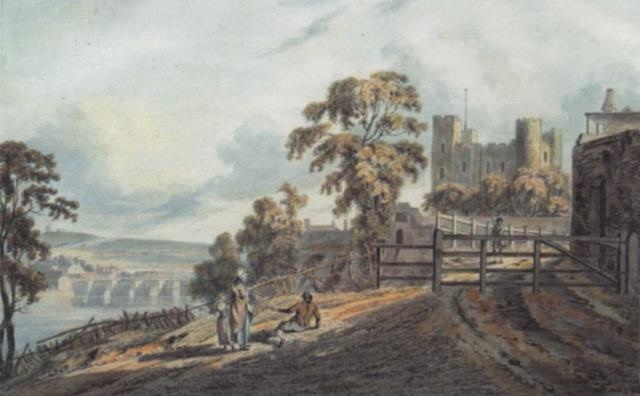
John Rathbone, View of Rochester, Kent, with figures Pen and Ink and Watercolor

John Rathbone (c. 1750–1807) was an English artist.

He was born in Cheshire about 1750, and practised in Manchester, London, and Preston as a landscape-painter in both oil and watercolour. Although he gained the name of the ‘Manchester Wilson’, his works in oil are opaque, flat, and ineffective. His works in watercolour, though in the light and washed style then practised, are well drawn and interesting. The British Museum possesses three of his watercolour drawings, all of which are landscapes with figures, and there is a cleverly drawn landscape by him in grey faded tints at South Kensington. There is a landscape in oils in the Walker Art Gallery, Liverpool, by Rathbone, and two hang in the Peel Park Art Gallery, Salford. Between 1785 and 1806 Rathbone exhibited forty-eight landscapes at the Royal Academy and two at the Society of Artists. He also exhibited three landscapes at the exhibition of the Society of Artists in Liverpool in August 1774. Rathbone died in 1807.

== Notes ==
Attribution

This article incorporates text from a publication now in the public domain: Lee, Sidney, ed. (1896). "Rathbone, John". Dictionary of National Biography. Vol. 47. London: Smith, Elder & Co.
