= Arthur Perigal =

English painter

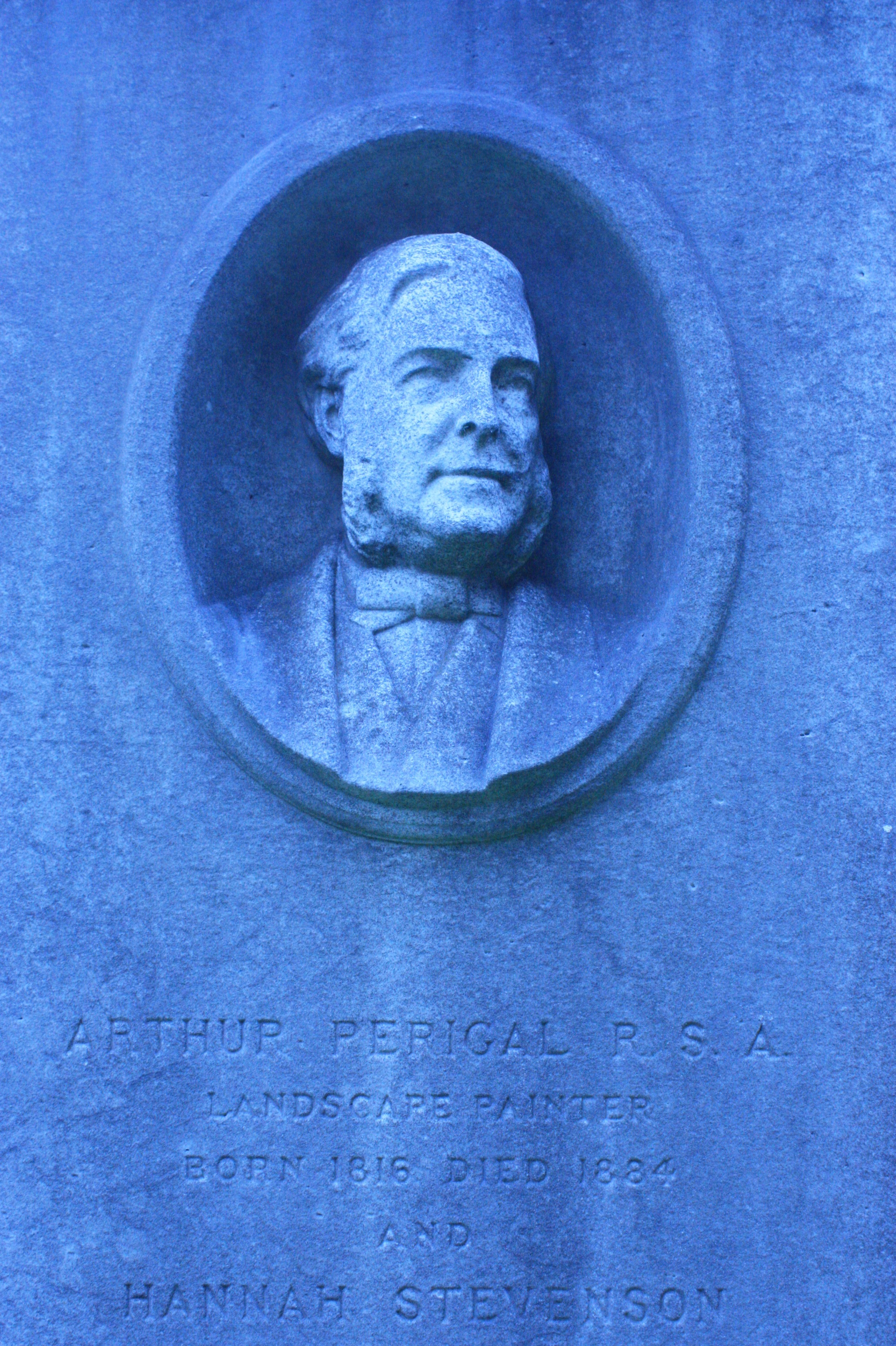
Grave of Arthur Perigal, Dean Cemetery

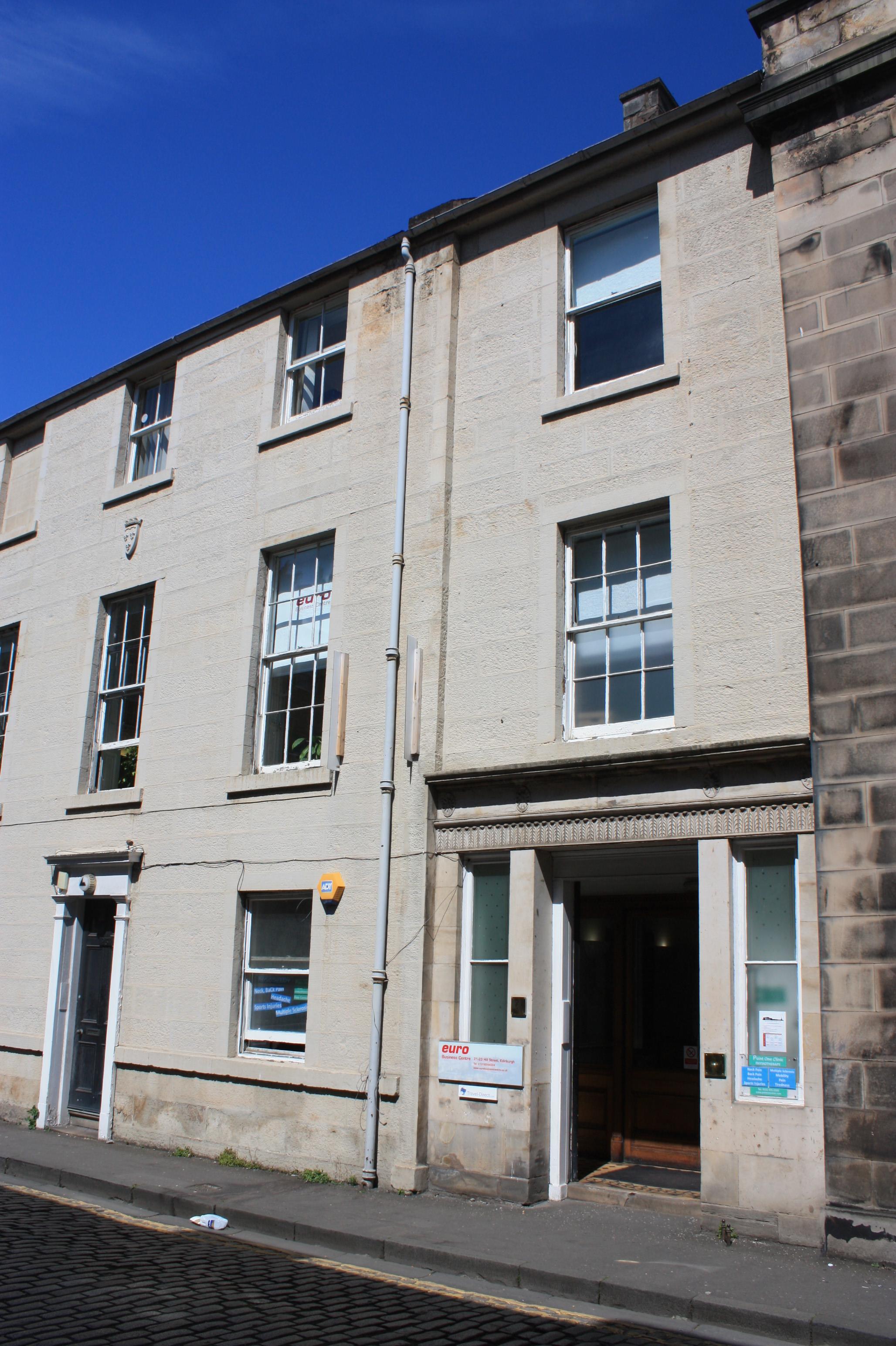
Perigal's house at 21 Hill Street, Edinburgh

Arthur Perigal (c.1784–1847) was a British historical, portrait and landscape painter.

== Life ==
Perigal was born in London on 10 January 1784 the son of Francois Perigal and his wife, Marie Ogier.

He studied under Henry Fuseli at the Royal Academy, and in 1811 gained the gold medal for historical painting, the subject being Themistocles taking Refuge at the Court of Admetus.

Perigal for some time practised portrait-painting in London, but around 1820 he appears to have gone to Northampton, and then later moved to Manchester. He lastly settled in Edinburgh, where he taught drawing, and from 1833 onwards exhibited portraits and landscapes at the Royal Scottish Academy.

In the 1830s Perigal is listed as living at 6 St Vincent Street in the Stockbridge area of Edinburgh.

Perigal died at 21 Hill Street, Edinburgh, on 19 September 1847, aged 63.

He is buried in Dean Cemetery near the north-west corner of the original cemetery.

== Works ==
Perigal began in 1810 to exhibit at the Royal Academy and the British Institution, sending the former a portrait and Queen Katherine delivering to Capucius her Farewell Letter to King Henry the Eighth, and to the latter The Restoration of the Daughters of Œdipus and Helena and Hermia (from Midsummer Night's Dream). These works were followed at the Royal Academy by Aridæus and Eurydice in 1811, his Themistocles in 1812, The Mother's last Embrace of her Infant Moses in 1813, and again in 1816; his last picture at the Academy was Going to Market, appeared in 1821. His contributions to the British Institution included Roderick Dhu discovering himself to FitzJames in 1811, the Death of Rizzio in 1813, Joseph sold by his Brethren in 1814, Scipio restoring the Captive Princess to her Lover in 1815, and, lastly, The Bard in 1828.

== Family ==
He was married to Louisa Susanna Pilleau (1780-1861). They had five children.

Their eldest son, Arthur Perigal, the younger (1816–1884) was a landscape-painter.

== Notes ==
Attribution

This article incorporates text from a publication now in the public domain: Lee, Sidney, ed. (1896). "Perigal, Arthur". Dictionary of National Biography. Vol. 45. London: Smith, Elder & Co.
