= Charles Calvert (painter) =

British landscape painter

- Born: 23 September 1785; Glossop, Derbyshire, England
- Died: 26 February 1852 (aged 66); Bowness-on-Windemere, Westmorland, England

Charles Calvert (1785–1852) was a British landscape painter. His brothers were artist Michael Pease Calvert, actor Frederick Baltimore Calvert, and surgeon George Calvert.

He spent much of his life and career in Manchester, and he played an important role in the establishment of the Royal Manchester Institution.

== Early life and link to the Calvert family ==
Calvert was born on 23 September 1785, the eldest child of Charles Calvert and Elizabeth Holliday. Charles Calvert the elder, a London-born Catholic and amateur landscape painter, was a steward for the Duke of Norfolk at Glossop Hall in Derbyshire. The elder Calvert was a man of means, able to purchase a large plot of land at 82 Oldham Street in Manchester and build a house there for his family; they lived in the city during the winter and Derbyshire during the summer. Half of his eight children were born during stays in Glossop (including Charles Calvert the younger), but all of them were baptised at a Catholic chapel on Rook Street in Manchester.

Charles Calvert the elder claimed that he and his children were members of the noble Calvert family, descended from Lord Baltimore—a Secretary of State for James I and the founder of the Maryland colony in the 17th century—and he was even attempting to legally prove his claim to the defunct baronetcy at the time of his death. Sources are inconsistent as to the exact nature of the claim: Thomas Letherbrow, a close family friend, wrote in 1878 that Charles Calvert the elder believed his grandfather to be one of the many illegitimate children of Frederick Calvert, the sixth and final Calvert governor of Maryland before the American Revolution who died in disgrace after a controversial rape trial; however, he was only two decades older than Charles and cannot have been his grandfather, let alone his great-grandfather. An encyclopaedia of prominent alumni of Manchester Grammar School, published in 1874 and based on information from the students' families, includes a biography of Michael Pease Calvert which states that the family were descended from "a younger brother" of the first Lord Baltimore. Michael Pease Calvert's son, John Raphael Calvert, also reaffirmed the claim in a letter to the Manchester City News in 1914, asserting that "the particulars of the Baltimore estates" were lost when his grandfather died.

Similarly, many sources claim that Charles Calvert the elder's brother was Raisley Calvert, a sculptor from Cumberland who was a benefactor of the poet William Wordsworth (and whose father was also a steward for the Duke of Norfolk, at Greystoke Castle), and but this appears to be another family claim taken at face value—in reality, Charles the elder was born nearly two decades before his alleged "brother", their parents have different names on their birth certificates, and other than the Duke of Norfolk there is no documentary or geographical connection between the two men.

Letherbrow is clear that the family did sincerely believe both their father's claims of noble descent and of having a brother who was "a bosom friend of Wordsworth"—however, they thought his name was "Randolph" rather than Raisley. The exact nature of both claims may have been distorted over time as younger generations of the family retold them to later acquaintances and biographers like John Howard Nodal, whose Art in Lancashire and Cheshire: a List of Deceased Artists (1884) is a source relied upon for the younger Charles Calvert's entry in the 1895 edition of the Dictionary of National Biography.

Many posthumous sources also mistakenly assume that the Lancashire-based animal painter Henry Calvert was one of Charles Calvert the elder's children—in reality, he was from an unrelated family in Nottinghamshire, and coincidentally happened to work and exhibit in Manchester during the same period as Charles and Michael Pease Calvert.

== Career ==
=== Early career ===
Calvert originally apprenticed in the cotton trade, and he worked as a merchant for a short time "in accordance with the wishes of his friends" before deciding to pursue landscape painting as a career. Notices announcing the dissolution of Calvert's cotton merchant partnership with Michael Gibson appeared in newspapers in December 1810; the earliest works attributed to him today date from the early 1810s.

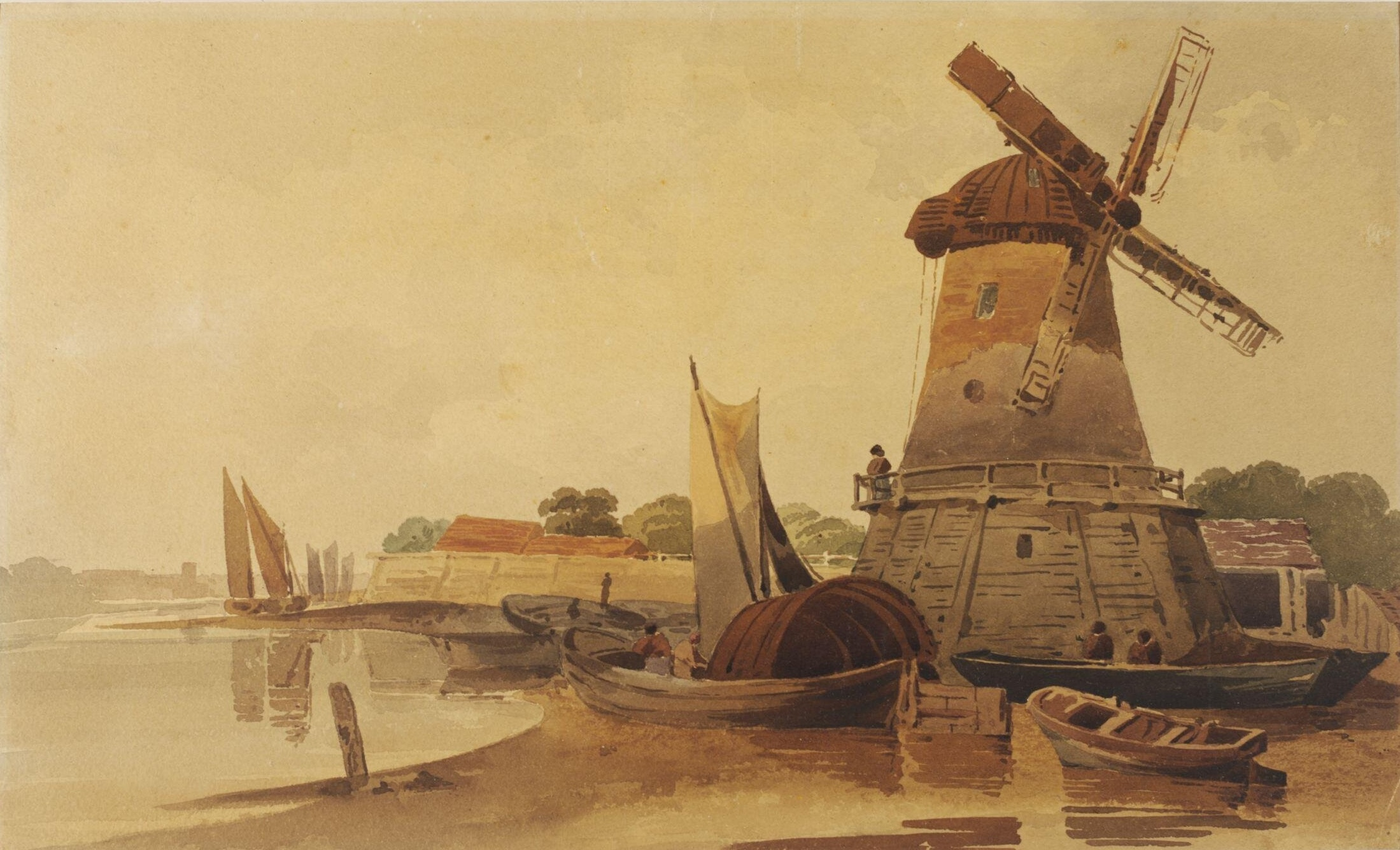
View on the Thames, with windmill and boats (1812)

He primarily painted in oils, but occasionally also produced watercolours.

One of Calvert's most notable works is View of the Manchester & Liverpool Railway Taken at Newton (1825), a drawing of two trains passing each other by the Old Legh Arms hotel on the world's first intercity passenger rail line, which was reproduced widely as an aquatint print. It is of particular interest to rail historians because its depiction of the locomotives somehow predicts the winning design at the Rainhill trials four years later, in 1829, yet at the same time contains a number of other inaccuracies when it comes to the designs of the passenger carriages and station buildings; explanations for this "mystery" include that it was commissioned for a prospectus to help raise investment in the railway and Calvert was given access to early engineering concepts, that "1825" is a false date used on a drawing which was actually produced as a faux-vintage memento for the emerging rail tourism market many years later, or that the drawing's date is simply a typo and the inconsistencies reflect a lack of attention to detail in the final designs by Calvert.

=== Role in establishment of Royal Manchester Institution ===
Manchester was not a centre of the arts during this time period—while several of the industrialising cities of Northern England had started to develop self-sustaining artistic communities with institutions similar to London's Royal Academy of Art, Manchester was a conspicuous laggard relative to peer cities like Liverpool and Birmingham, and its reputation for philistinism would endure well into the Victorian era. Artists of the period lived itinerant lives, travelling from place to place but never "vegetating" anywhere too long out of a belief that it would compromise the quality of their art. The first artist to make Manchester his permanent home was Joseph Parry in 1790—he proved to be an important influence on the next generation of artists who followed, whether born in Manchester or immigrating from elsewhere in the country, and of which Calvert would become one of the most influential figures.

In 1823, one of Parry's sons, the portrait painter David Henry Parry, visited Leeds with another young artist—Frank Stone—and their mutual friend, William Brigham, to see an exhibition put on by the Northern Society for the Encouragement of the Fine Arts; the society had been formed in the 1800s as a way of collectively soliciting patronage from wealthy industrialists and merchants. They returned home, inspired, and Parry summoned a meeting of the most prominent artists working in Manchester at that time—including his brother James Parry, Calvert, and Arthur Perigal—to form a new society called the Associated Artists of Manchester. Over the following months they secured patronage from local business and political leaders (including Sir Oswald Mosley), elected a board of governors, and agreed to establish "the Manchester Institution for the Promotion of Literature, Science, and the Arts," a building which would contain art galleries (for annual exhibitions of works by local artists), lecture theatres, a library, and research laboratories.

After raising £21,100 (roughly £1.6m in 2023 adjusted for inflation) a plot of land was purchased on Mosley Street in 1825, and construction started on a building designed by Charles Barry which would be completed by 1834. In the meantime, the newly christened Royal Manchester Institution held Manchester's first public exhibition of paintings on Market Street in 1827.

The Institution continued to hold annual exhibitions that featured both nationally and internationally renowned works, alongside those of artists working locally, for decades, and into the 1830s there was a core generation of Manchester-based artists—Calvert and his brother Michael Pease Calvert, James Parry, John Ralston, Henry Liverseege, Arthur Perigal, and Thomas Henry Illidge—whose works were always included. He also exhibited two paintings at the Royal Academy in London during this period.

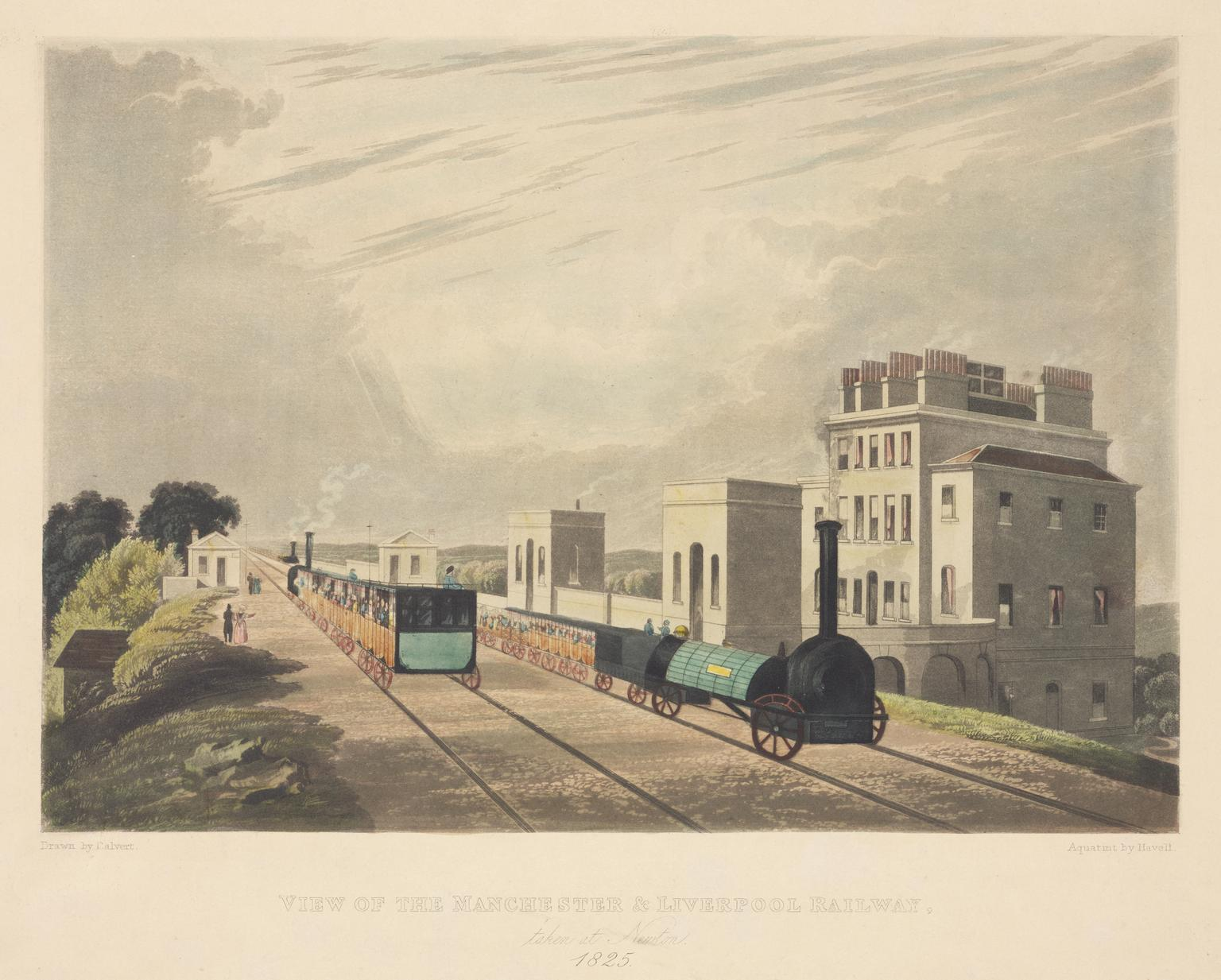
View of the Manchester & Liverpool Railway Taken at Newton (1825)

=== Influence on other painters ===
Calvert taught art to supplement his income. In the late 1810s and into the 1820s he ran a drawing school at 17 Lloyd Street known as "The Academy", and in the 1830s he led a drawing class at the Manchester Mechanics' Institute. As one of the older members of the group of artists that helped found the Royal Manchester Institution, he was also often singled out by critics as an example that his younger peers in the city should follow.

He mentored Lancashire artists such as William Percy and Joseph Maiden, as well as William Bradley, who married Calvert's eldest daughter Eliza in July 1833. Thomas Letherbrow, writing in 1878, recalled Calvert's advice to his students:

''Lay in your sky and distance with blue and grey; use warmer colours for your middle distance; then come on with browns, reds, and yellows for your foreground, and," said he—suiting with vigorous action the words—''Whack it in—like Claude!" What would the author of Modern Painters say to that? Tall in person, vivacious in manner, abounding in good stories, "not only witty himself but the cause that wit was in other men;" his nose a high aquiline or hook, hinting of the wine his wit had brightened, thus he dwells in memory, the father of the wife of William Bradley.

=== Later career ===
In November 1830 he won the gold medal (and 40 guineas) in the Heywood Prize—instituted in 1829 for the best landscape produced within 40 miles of Manchester—for his painting of Loch Katrine, and he won silver in November 1835 for his drawing of Beeston Castle.

However, critical success did not guarantee him or his peers financial stability, and Calvert was one of the founding "nucleus" of painters, sculptors, and architects who formed "the Manchester Artists" in 1830, a "fraternity society" which was intended to represent their collective interests when dealing with the governors of the Royal Manchester Institution out of a fear that they were failing to create a sustainable art market in the city. This fear proved real in 1837 when Calvert was declared bankrupt, and his personal collection of books, paintings, drawings, engravings, and other artworks was seized by his creditors and auctioned off to settle his debts.

He exhibited at the Royal Manchester Institution regularly until 1848; the Manchester Courier reported in that year that "our old townsman comes out as strong as ever, with two large highly finished, and two extremely pretty small drawings" which "betray no decay of his powers." However, his loyalty to Manchester ended in the late 1840s when his health began to decline and he relocated to Undermillbeck, a small village besides Windermere in the Lake District—a region he was intensely passionate about, and where he had already spent considerable time whenever not required in Manchester for teaching engagements.

== Personal life ==
Calvert married 17-year-old Martha Scotson, 18 years his junior, on 10 October 1815; they had three children.

On 18 May 1827 Calvert was mugged by 18-year-old Henry Henshaw, who broke Calvert's jaw with a truncheon and stole his pocket watch; Henshaw was arrested and sentenced to transportation to Australia.

Calvert died in Bowness-on-Windermere, Westmorland, on 26 February 1852, and was buried there. His obituary in The Art Journal said:

Mr. Calvert’s mind teemed with elegant and varied compositions in landscape, and his love of Nature was such, that when released from the arduous yet necessary drudgery of teaching, he was constantly to be found amongst the lovely lake scenery in the north of England, which he depicted with great felicity, and where his remains are now, at his particular request, interred. His health had been such for some years as to have removed him from the public eye; but, though confined to his bed, his mind and hand have been occupied in feebly delineating that scenery which he had in former years painted with so much vigour, and by which he has earned for himself a very considerable reputation in Manchester and its neighbourhood.
