= Frederick Baltimore Calvert =

British actor and academic (1793 – 1877)

- Born: February 11, 1793; Glossop Hall, Derbyshire
- Died: April 25, 1877 (aged 84); Edinburgh

Frederick Baltimore Calvert (February 11, 1793 – April 25, 1877) was an English actor and academic.

He was a brother of artists Charles and Michael Pease Calvert, and surgeon George Calvert.

== Early life and link to the Calvert family ==
Calvert was born on 10 April 1793, the sixth child of Charles Calvert and Elizabeth Holliday. Charles Calvert was a London-born Catholic and amateur landscape painter, and a steward for the Duke of Norfolk at Glossop Hall in Derbyshire. The elder Calvert was a man of means, able to purchase a large plot of land at 82 Oldham Street in Manchester and build a house there for his family; they lived in the city during the winter and Derbyshire during the summer. Several of his eight children were born during stays in Glossop (including Frederick), and all of them were baptised at a Catholic chapel on Rook Street in Manchester.

Charles Calvert claimed that he and his children were members of the noble Calvert family, descended from Lord Baltimore—a Secretary of State for James I and the founder of the Maryland colony in the 17th century—and he was even attempting to legally prove his claim to the defunct baronetcy at the time of his death. Sources are inconsistent as to the exact nature of the claim: Thomas Letherbrow, a close family friend, wrote in 1878 that Charles believed his grandfather to be one of the many illegitimate children of Frederick Calvert, the sixth and final Calvert governor of Maryland before the American Revolution who died in disgrace after a controversial rape trial; however, he was only two decades older than Charles and cannot have been his grandfather, let alone his great-grandfather. An encyclopaedia of prominent alumni of Manchester Grammar School, published in 1874 and based on information from the students' families, includes a biography of Michael Pease Calvert which states that the family were descended from "a younger brother" of the first Lord Baltimore. Michael Pease Calvert's son, John Raphael Calvert, also reaffirmed the claim in a letter to the Manchester City News in 1914, asserting that "the particulars of the Baltimore estates" were lost when his grandfather died.

Similarly, many sources claim that Charles Calvert's brother was Raisley Calvert, a sculptor from Cumberland who was a benefactor of the poet William Wordsworth (and whose father was also a steward for the Duke of Norfolk, at Greystoke Castle), but this appears to be another family claim taken at face value—in reality, Charles was born nearly two decades before his alleged "brother", their parents have different names on their birth certificates, and other than the Duke of Norfolk there is no documentary or geographical connection between the two men. Letherbrow is clear that the family did sincerely believe both their father's claims of noble descent and of having a brother who was "a bosom friend of Wordsworth"—however, they thought his name was "Randolph" rather than Raisley. The exact nature of both claims may have been distorted over time as younger generations of the family retold them to later acquaintances and biographers like John Howard Nodal, whose Art in Lancashire and Cheshire: a List of Deceased Artists (1884) is a source relied upon for the younger Charles Calvert's entry in the 1895 edition of the Dictionary of National Biography.

Many posthumous sources also mistakenly assume that the Lancashire-based animal painter Henry Calvert was one of Frederick Calvert's brothers—in reality, he was from an unrelated family in Nottinghamshire who coincidentally happened to work and exhibit in Manchester during the same period as Charles and Michael Pease Calvert.

Calvert was a student of Manchester Grammar School, and then he boarded at St. Edmund's College, a Catholic seminary in Ware in Hertfordshire, with the expectation that he would become a priest.

== Career ==
=== Actor ===
Calvert converted to Protestantism and dropped out of seminary, deciding instead to become an actor. He used "Young" as his stage name (not to be confused with Charles Mayne Young).

He performed at theatres throughout the United Kingdom, but found particular success in Dublin in 1824, where he became the "leading tragedian" of the Theatre Royal:

By nature he was well fitted for this difficult and trying profession, tall and commanding in person, of robust constitution, and great fluency and vigour in speech, all united with great literary talents, extensive erudition, and a most retentive memory, he was no mere mechanical stage-walker, with him the drama was profession and not a trade.

Notable actors whom he appeared alongside—often in leading roles—included Edmund Kean, William Charles Macready, and George Vandenhoff.

=== Academic ===
Calvert was a keen student of language and literature—familiar with literature from across Europe—and pursued his academic interests in parallel with his theatrical career. In 1822 he wrote A Defence of the Acted Drama, a treatise responding to a popular sermon by the preacher Thomas Best which argued that "none who frequent [the theatre] can be real Christians;" Calvert's response was also widely read, and it was even delivered as a speech to the annual dinner of the Royal Theatrical Fund by John Fawcett.

In 1829 he retired from acting and moved his family to Scotland when he became a lecturer on elocution at King's College at the University of Aberdeen. In 1846 he became master of English language and literature at the Edinburgh Academy, in 1847 he became a lecturer at the Royal Society of Edinburgh, and he then also became a lecturer on elocution at the Free Church colleges of Edinburgh and Glasgow.

Throughout this time he also continued to travel widely, giving lectures at athenaeums and mechanics' institutes on oratory, poetry, and other literary subjects in the large towns and cities of Scotland, England, and the United States.

In 1870, at the age of 77, Calvert published a translation of Cicero's De Oratore; it was praised for being "one of the most successful efforts of the kind in our language," and "signal proof that Latin can be rendered into vigorous, flowing, and idiomatic English, with strict adherence to the sense of the author and no deterioration of the higher qualities of his language."

== Personal life and death ==
He married Rebecca Percy in Whitby on 14 February 1818, and they had ten children (eight of whom made it to adulthood). Their youngest son, Michael Pease Calvert, also became both an actor—performing under the name "Henry Talbot"—and a teacher of elocution.

He died at his home in Edinburgh on 25 April 1877.

== Notable works ==
- A Defence of the Acted Drama (1822)
- Principles of Elocution (1852) by T. Ewing (edited by Calvert)
- An Ode to Shakespeare (1864)
- The Art of Reading and Preaching Distinctly (1869)
- The De Oratore of Cicero (1870)
