= Michael Pease Calvert =

British painter (1798-1875)

- Born: 15 March 1798; Glossop, Derbyshire, England
- Died: 25 January 1875 (aged 76); Manchester, Lancashire, England

Michael Pease Calvert (15 March 1798 - 25 January 1875) was a British landscape painter.

He was a brother of painter Charles Calvert, actor Frederick Baltimore Calvert, and surgeon George Calvert.

== Early life ==
Calvert was the youngest of eight children of Charles Calvert and Elizabeth Holliday, born on 15 March 1798.

Charles Calvert the elder, a London-born Catholic and amateur landscape painter, was a steward for the Duke of Norfolk at Glossop Hall in Derbyshire. The elder Calvert was a man of means, able to purchase a large plot of land at 82 Oldham Street in Manchester and build a house there for his family; they lived in the city during the winter and Derbyshire during the summer. Michael and some of his other siblings were born back in Glossop, but all of them were baptised at a Catholic chapel on Rook Street in Manchester; Michael was born seven months after Charles' death. He was partly named after Elizabeth Colegrave (née Pease), a close family friend who was godmother to two of his sisters.

Charles Calvert the elder claimed that he and his children were members of the noble Calvert family, descended from Lord Baltimore—a Secretary of State for James I and the founder of the Maryland colony in the 17th century—and he was even attempting to legally prove his claim to the defunct baronetcy at the time of his death. Sources are inconsistent as to the exact nature of the claim: Thomas Letherbrow, a close family friend, wrote in 1878 that Charles Calvert the elder believed his grandfather to be one of the many illegitimate children of Frederick Calvert, the sixth and final Calvert governor of Maryland before the American Revolution who died in disgrace after a controversial rape trial; however, he was only two decades older than Charles and cannot have been his grandfather, let alone his great-grandfather. An encyclopaedia of prominent alumni of Manchester Grammar School, published in 1874 and based on information from the students' families, includes a biography of Michael Pease Calvert which states that the family were descended from "a younger brother" of the first Lord Baltimore.

Similarly, many sources claim that Charles Calvert the elder's brother was Raisley Calvert, a sculptor from Cumberland who was a benefactor of the poet William Wordsworth (and whose father was also a steward for the Duke of Norfolk, at Greystoke Castle), but this appears to be another family claim taken at face value—in reality, Charles the elder was born nearly two decades before his alleged "brother", their parents have different names on their birth certificates, and other than the Duke of Norfolk there is no documentary or geographical connection between the two men.

Letherbrow is clear that the family did sincerely believe both their father's claims of noble descent and of having a brother who was "a bosom friend of Wordsworth"—however, they thought his name was "Randolph" rather than Raisley. Michael Pease Calvert's son, John Raphael Calvert, also reaffirmed the claim in a letter to the Manchester City News in 1914, asserting that "the particulars of the Baltimore estates" were lost when his grandfather died. The exact nature of both claims may have been distorted over time as younger generations of the family retold them to later acquaintances and biographers like John Howard Nodal, whose Art in Lancashire and Cheshire: a List of Deceased Artists (1884) is a source relied upon for the younger Charles Calvert's entry in the 1895 edition of the Dictionary of National Biography.

Many posthumous sources also mistakenly assume that the Lancashire-based animal painter Henry Calvert was one of Charles Calvert the elder's children—in reality, he was from an unrelated family in Nottinghamshire who coincidentally happened to work and exhibit in Manchester during the same period as Charles and Michael Pease Calvert.

== Career ==
Calvert's brother Charles Calvert was instrumental in the founding of the Royal Manchester Institution as one of the men, led by David Henry Parry, who gathered to form the Associated Artists of Manchester in 1823. Calvert was one of the artists whose work was included in the Institution's first exhibition in 1827, and he and his brother were part of a select group of artists working locally—alongside David Henry Parry, James Parry, John Ralston, Henry Liverseege, Arthur Perigal, and Thomas Henry Illidge—whose pieces were included in each of the Institution's annual exhibitions into the early 1830s.

He was a close friend of the poet Charles Swain, and Swain's nephew Frederick Tavaré was Calvert's apprentice from 1826 to 1831.

Calvert lived in Broughton for most of his adult life. He continued to exhibit at local museums regularly until the 1860s, although by the time of the 1861 census he had started listing his occupation as "retired landscape painter."

== Personal life and death ==
Calvert was Catholic; he was one of the leaders of a large meeting of Manchester and Salford Catholics held in February 1851 to rally political opposition to the Ecclesiastical Titles Act 1851.

Calvert married Sarah Barker in 1835, and they had seven children before Sarah died in 1854; Calvert never remarried. In 1869 their third daughter, Sarah Ann, married Charles Hammersley, nephew of James Astbury Hammersley, the founding president of the Manchester Academy of Fine Arts.

Calvert died on 25 January 1875 at his home, 28 Camp Street in Lower Broughton, aged 76; he was buried at St. Chad's Church.
