= Raisley Calvert =

British sculptor

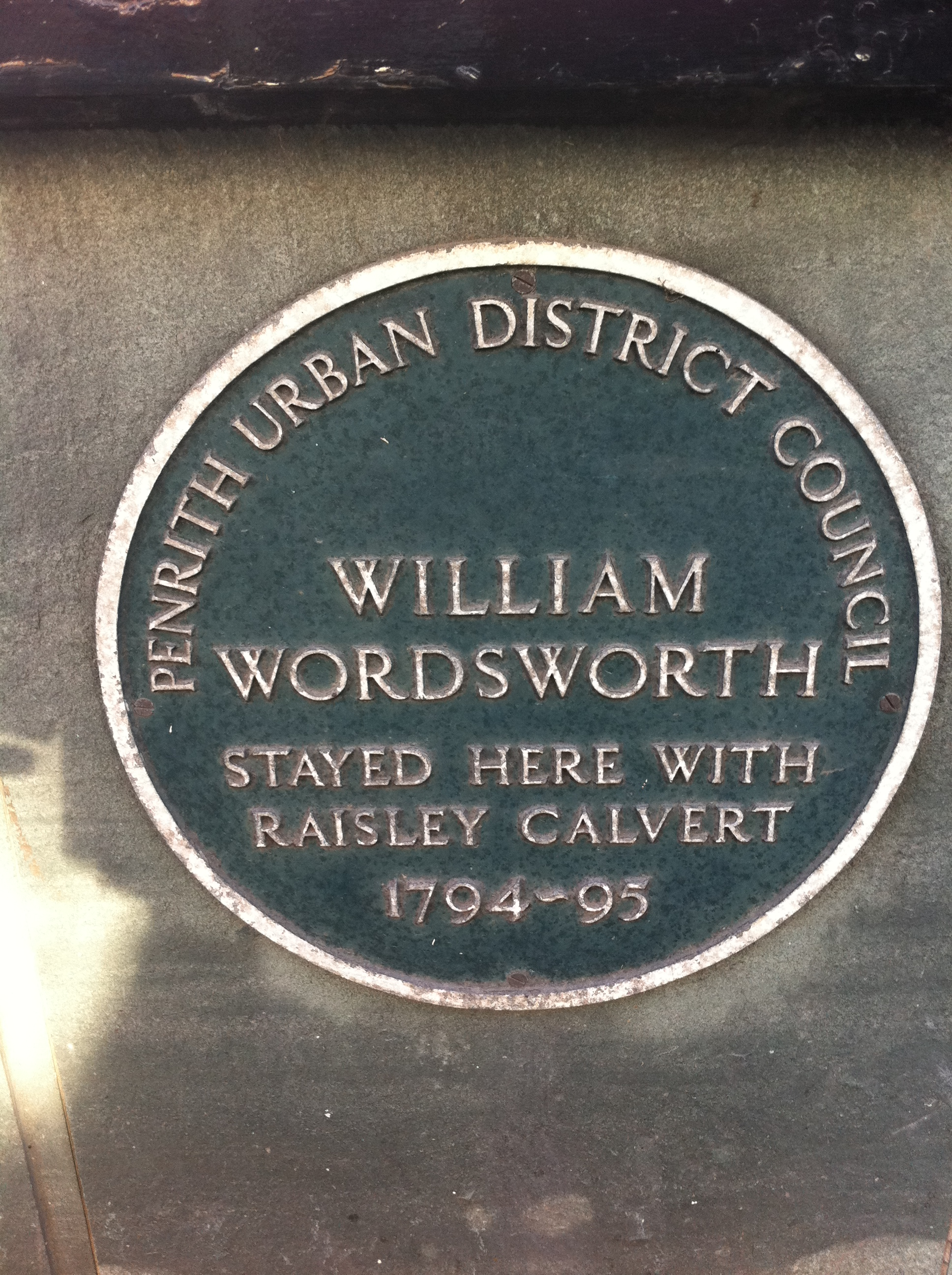
William Wordsworth and Raisley Calvert plaque on the Robin Hood Inn in Penrith

Raisley Calvert (1773-1795) was a British sculptor. He is best known as a benefactor of the poet William Wordsworth.

== The Calvert family ==
Calvert's exact birth date is unknown, but he was baptised on 16 September 1773. He was born in Greystoke, Cumberland, where his father—also called Raisley—was steward for the Duke of Norfolk's estate at Greystoke Castle.

Many sources list his older brother as Charles Calvert (1754-1797), another steward of the Duke of Norfolk (at Glossop Hall in Derbyshire), who is most notable as the father of painters Charles and Michael Pease Calvert, actor Frederick Baltimore Calvert, and surgeon George Calvert. Charles the elder claimed to be a descendant of Lord Baltimore, a Secretary of State for James I and the founder of the Maryland colony in the 17th century, which would make him and his children members of the noble Calvert family. Charles believed that his grandfather was one of the many illegitimate children of Frederick Calvert, 6th Baron Baltimore—the sixth and final Calvert governor of Maryland before the American Revolution, who died in disgrace after a controversial rape trial—and he was even attempting to legally prove his claim to the defunct baronetcy at the time of his death.

However, there is significant uncertainty over both this claim of noble heritage and whether Charles and Raisley Calvert were actually siblings: the elder Raisley Calvert was 62 years old when he died in 1791, making him older than his alleged "grandfather" by three years, while Charles' father is listed as another Charles Calvert on the record of his baptism at the chapel of the Venetian embassy in London (rather than in Cumberland). Other than both working for the Duke of Norfolk there is no documentary or geographical connection between the two men, and later biographies which claim otherwise—like an 1874 encyclopaedia of prominent alumni of Manchester Grammar School, which was based on information from the students' families—are likely derived from the Manchester Calvert family's version of events, and may have been distorted over time as younger generations of the family retold the claims to later acquaintances and biographers. Thomas Letherbrow, a friend of the Manchester Calverts, wrote in 1878 that Charles' children sincerely believed both their father's claims to noble descent and to having had a brother who was a "bosom friend of Wordsworth"—however, they thought his name was "Randolph" rather than Raisley.

Similarly, some sources mistakenly include the Lancashire-based animal painter Henry Calvert as another of Raisley Calvert's nephews via Charles Calvert—in reality, he was from an unrelated family in Nottinghamshire.

There is also uncertainty around the description of Calvert as a sculptor as, to date, no pieces have been attributed to him—this may be because nothing has survived to the modern day, or because he merely aspired to become a sculptor and died before he could produce anything.

== Early death & impact on Wordsworth ==
Calvert had two siblings: younger sister Anne (b.1775), and older brother William (b.1770). William Calvert and William Wordsworth went to school together at Hawkshead Grammar School, and the boys became close lifelong friends; Wordsworth's father was also an agent for a noble (the Earl of Lonsdale) and their families may have already been acquainted. After finishing school, William Calvert signed up as an ensign in the Duke of Norfolk's regiment, while Wordsworth studied at St. John's College, Cambridge and went on several trips to Continental Europe.

When the elder Raisley Calvert died in 1791, his sons inherited his substantial assets and land holdings in Keswick, including the family home, Greta Bank. William was generous with his inheritance; in 1793, he took Wordsworth—who at that time was struggling to make a living as a writer—on an all-expenses-paid tour of southern England, which was cut short after a month on the Isle of Wight when their carriage crashed in a ditch and splintered apart.

Raisley Calvert followed Wordsworth to Cambridge, but dropped out after only a few weeks. Unlike his brother—who was more interested in chemistry and agriculture than poetry—Raisley had an artistic temperament, and in a letter to William he justified his decision to leave Cambridge by arguing that he would learn more from travelling around Europe like Wordsworth had. He returned to Cumberland, and in 1794 the Calverts invited Wordsworth and his sister, Dorothy, to stay rent-free at Windybrow, a cottage on the family's estate in Keswick; at the time Wordsworth was unemployed and trying to secure a job as a journalist in London, so the offer was eagerly accepted.

However, Calvert soon fell ill with consumption, and—with William stationed with his regiment in Newcastle—Wordsworth took it upon himself to care for his friend's brother. In a letter dated 1 October 1794, Wordsworth wrote to William Calvert to ask for his permission to use the family's money to take Calvert to Lisbon, in the hope that warmer weather would help him recover. He also informed William that Calvert had updated his will to include a clause that would give Wordsworth £600 in the event of his death, to support his ambitions of becoming a poet. They set out south, but never made it further than the Robin Hood Inn in Penrith—Calvert became too sick to travel any further, and Wordsworth stayed by his side until he died sometime between 5 and 16 January 1795.

When Calvert's will was opened it was revealed that his bequest to Wordsworth was actually £900—roughly £90,000 in 2023, adjusted for inflation—to be granted in the form of an annuity. It was a transformative sum, freeing Wordsworth from the need to seek out employment and allowing him to focus on writing poetry for the next eight years, by which time he had successfully established himself. In an 1805 letter to George Beaumont he wrote: "I should have been forced into one of the professions [the church or law] by necessity, had not a friend left me £900. This bequest was from a young man with whom, though I call him friend, I had but little connection; and the act was done entirely from a confidence on his part that I had powers and attainments which might be of use to mankind." Thomas De Quincey described it as "the basis of Wordsworth's prosperity in life."

Wordsworth "immortalised" Calvert in Book XIV of The Prelude:

A youth (he bore

The name of Calvert—it shall live if words

Of mine can give it life), in firm belief

That by endowments not from me withheld

Good might be furthered—in his last decay

By a bequest sufficient for my needs

Enabled me to pause for choice, and walk

At large and unrestrainted, nor damped too soon

By mortal cares. Himself no Poet, yet

Far less a common follower of the world,

He deemed that my pursuits and labours lay

Apart from all that leads to wealth, or even

A necessary maintenance insures,

Without some hazard to the finer sense;

He cleared a passage for me, and the stream

Flowed in the bent of Nature.

He also dedicated a sonnet to Calvert in 1806:

Calvert! it must not be unheard by them

Who may respect my name, that I to thee

Owed many years of early liberty.

This care was thine when sickness did condemn

Thy youth to hopeless wasting, root and stem—

That I, if frugal and severe, might stray

Where'er I liked; and finally array

My temples with the Muse's diadem.

Hence, if in freedom I have loved the truth;

If there be aught of pure, or good, or great,

In my past verse; or shall be, in the lays

Of higher mood, which now I meditate;—

It gladdens me, O worthy, short-lived, Youth!

To think how much of this will be thy praise.

The Wordsworth and Calvert families remained close for decades, and Greta Bank became an epicentre for the literary community which produced the Lake Poets; Samuel Taylor Coleridge lived less than a mile away, and other regular visitors of note included Robert Southey, William Hazlitt, and Charles Lamb.

The Calvert Trust—a charity which organises outdoor activities for people with disabilities in British National Parks—now owns Windybrow, and is named after Calvert.
