= Hadfield =

Hadfield may refer to:

== Places ==
- Hadfield, Victoria, Australia, a suburb of Melbourne
- Hadfield, Derbyshire, England, a town

== Other uses ==
- Hadfield (surname)
- Hadfields Limited, British steel manufacturer
  - Hadfield steel, an alloy
- 14143 Hadfield, asteroid
- Hadfield railway station, Hadfield, Derbyshire
- Hadfield railway station, New Zealand
