= Hadfield (surname) =

Hadfield is a surname. Notable people with the surname include:

- Charles Hadfield (historian) (1909–1996), British canal historian
- Charles Hadfield (journalist) (1821–1884), English journalist
- Chris Hadfield (born 1959), Canadian astronaut
- Darcy Hadfield (1889–1964), New Zealand rower
- George Hadfield (architect) (1763–1826), American architect
- George Hadfield, musician, American member of This World Fair
- George Hadfield (politician) (1787–1879), British politician
- Isabel Hadfield (1893–1965), British physical chemist
- James Hadfield (died 1841), failed British regicide
- Jen Hadfield (born 1978), British poet and artist
- John Hadfield (writer) (1907–1999), British writer
- Jordan Hadfield (born 1987), English footballer
- Matthew Ellison Hadfield (1812–1885), British architect
- Octavius Hadfield (1814–1904), New Zealand Anglican missionary
- Peter Hadfield (athlete) (born 1955), Australian athlete
- Peter Hadfield (journalist), British YouTuber "Potholer54"
- Robert Hadfield (1858–1940), British metallurgist
- Ron Hadfield (1939–2013), British police officer
- Tom Hadfield (born 1982), British businessman
- Tom Hadfield (rugby league), New Zealand rugby footballer
- Vic Hadfield (born 1940), Canadian ice hockey player
