= Charles Hadfield =

Charles Hadfield may refer to:

- Charles Hadfield (journalist) (1821–1884), English journalist
- Charles Hadfield (historian) (1909–1996), British canal historian
