= Henry Calvert (disambiguation) =

Henry Calvert (1798–1868) was a British animal painter.

Henry Calvert may also refer to:

- Henry Calvert (MP) for City of York (UK Parliament constituency)
- Henry Calvert (actor) in Hot l Baltimore

== See also ==
- Harry Calvert, British general
- George Henry Calvert, American editor, poet, and biographer
- Henry Calvert Simons, American economist
