= Early life of William Wordsworth =

William Wordsworth (7 April 1770 – 23 April 1850) was an English Romantic poet who, with Samuel Taylor Coleridge, helped launch the Romantic Age in English literature with their 1798 joint publication, Lyrical Ballads. His early years were dominated by his experience of old Trafford around the Lake District and the English moors. Dorothy Wordsworth, his sister, served as his early companion until their mother's death and their separation when he was sent to school.

== Parents ==
Wordsworth's parents were John Wordsworth, a legal agent for James Lowther, 1st Earl of Lonsdale and Collector of Customs at Whitehaven, and his wife, Ann Cookson. John was the son of Richard Wordsworth, a land owner who served as a legal agent to the Lowther family.

Like his father, John became a legal agent for James Lowther, 1st Earl of Lonsdale and was made Bailiff and Recorder for Cockermouth and Coroner for the Seigniory of Millom.

Ann was the daughter of William Cookson, a linen-draper, and Dorothy Crackanthorpe, daughter of a gentry family in Westmorland. They lived above Cookson's shop in Penrith, Cumbria. Ann's brother, Christopher "Kit" Crackanthorpe Cookson (later, Christopher Crackanthorpe) inherited the family estate of Newbiggin Hall.

John, at the age of 26, married Ann, 18, in 1766, and he used his connections with the Lowther family to move into a large mansion in the small town of Cockermouth, Cumbria, in the Lake District. John owned many properties, in Cockermouth and Ravenglass, and he inherited a property at Sockbridge, which was originally purchased by his father and given to John after his older brother, Richard, was disinherited by their father. However, the brothers’ relationship was not strained by this decision, and Richard would become guardian to John's children after his death.

William's mother died when he was 7 years old and he became an orphan at the age of 13 years.

=== Childhood ===
Wordsworth was born on 7 April 1770 in Cockermouth, the second of five children. His sister, the poet, and diarist Dorothy, to whom he was close all his life, was born the following year, and the two were baptized together. They had three other siblings: Richard, the eldest who became a lawyer; John, born after Dorothy, who would become a poet and enjoy nature with William and Dorothy until he died in an 1805 shipwreck; and Christopher, the youngest, who would become a scholar and eventually Master of Trinity College, Cambridge. Although he lived at his father's mansion, Wordsworth, as with his siblings, had little involvement with their father, and they would be distant with him until his death in 1783.

Wordsworth's father, although rarely present, did teach him poetry, including that of Milton, Shakespeare, and Spenser, in addition to allowing his son to rely on his father's library. In addition to spending his time reading in Cockermouth, he would stay at his mother's parents home in Penrith, for extended periods of time, which took place primarily during 1775–1776 and during the winter months of 1776–1777. At Penrith, Wordsworth was exposed to the moors and was influenced by his experience with the landscape and was further turned towards nature by the harsh treatment he received at the hands of his relatives. In particular, Wordsworth could not get along with his grandparents and his uncle, and his hostile interactions with them distressed him to the point of contemplating suicide.

In March 1778, Ann died of an illness, possibly pneumonia, at Penrith. After the death of his mother in 1778, his father was inconsolable and sent his children away to be raised by their relatives. William was taken in by his mother's family and eventually sent to Hawkshead Grammar School, and Dorothy was sent to live with Elizabeth Threlkeld, Ann's cousin, in Halifax. She and William did not meet again for another nine years. Although Hawkshead was Wordsworth's first serious experience with education, he was taught to read by his mother and attended a tiny school in Cockermouth of low quality.

=== Education and nature ===
At Penrith, Wordsworth was sent to a school for the children of upper-class families and taught by Ann Birkett, a woman who insisted in instilling tradition in her students that included pursuing both scholarly and local activities, especially the festivals around Easter, May Day, or Shrove Tide. Wordsworth was taught both the Bible and the Spectator, but little else. It was at the school that Wordsworth was to meet the Hutchinsons, including Mary, who would be his future wife. Life at Penrith wasn't a happy time for Wordsworth, because he was unsatisfied with his grandparents' treatment; he still spent time at his grandparents' home and their relationship was still tense. Wordsworth became rebellious to the point of destroying a family portrait.

His discontent with his familial situation provoked Wordsworth to spend his time wandering away from his home, an action Wordsworth relates as uniting a childish imagination with both nature and mankind in The Prelude. He became attached to nature, and, when he was finally sent to school in Hawkshead, he was able to fully enjoy the countryside. Besides the local surroundings, Wordsworth was educated at the Hawkshead Grammar School, which had a reputation for scholarship and preparation for University entrance.

A large portion of Wordsworth's education at Hawkshead was based on mathematics. The rest of the curriculum was based on teaching the classics, and it was during his classical studies that Wordsworth gained a love for Latin literature. Besides his literary education, Wordsworth and his brothers were given dancing lessons in 1785. While Wordsworth was taught at Hawkshead, he boarded with Hugh and Ann Tyson in the nearby hamlet of Colthouse, where he was exposed to the local yarn trade. The community had a strong Quaker influence, and Wordsworth, after experiencing their traditions, rejected their fixation on praising God for a relationship with the divine that would involve a more direct interaction.

=== College ===
Hawkshead School had a strong relationship with St.John's College at Cambridge University and, in October 1787, Wordsworth became an undergraduate there.

== Early career ==
Wordsworth felt that his life before Samuel Taylor Coleridge was sedentary and dull and his poetry amounted to little. When Coleridge was near, he was Wordsworth's muse, and Coleridge's praise and encouragement kept Wordsworth motivated. Dorothy described Wordsworth while around Coleridge when she wrote: "His faculties seem to expand every day, he composes with much more facility than he did". It was under Coleridge's support that Wordsworth was encouraged to write poetry intended to rival Milton. William Wordsworth, one of the pioneers of the Romantic movement in English poetry, was deeply influenced by the French revolution which broke out in 1789.The spirit of revolution popularly summarised as "liberty, equality, fraternity" informed the romantic elements in his poetry. His friendship with Coleridge led to joint literary venture in the form of publication of The Lyrical Ballads in 1798. When Wordsworth was forced to move from Alfoxden, Wordsworth, Coleridge, and Dorothy agreed to travel to Germany in September 1798. Originally, Coleridge and Wordsworth lived together in Hamburg, until Coleridge decided to look for a place to live at Ratzeburg. Wordsworth wanted to join his friend, but was forced to decline over monetary issues; Wordsworth was unable to provide for both himself and his sister in such an expensive town, and they instead moved to Goslar. The separation, with the expenses, made it impossible for Wordsworth to spend time with Coleridge until after the winter of 1798.

Wordsworth continued to write even without the support of Coleridge's company, and from October 1798 to February 1799 Wordsworth began writing the "Matthew" poems along with the "Lucy" poems and other poems. These poems express the frustration and anxiety that Wordsworth was feeling In particular, it is possible that the "Lucy" poems allowed Wordsworth to vent his frustration with his sister, and that they contain the subconscious desire for his sister to die. The two poems are thematically unique compared to Wordsworth's other poems, especially in their portrayal of loss and a lack of faith that nature is able to provide comfort or solutions to life's problems. This reversal of Wordsworth's view of nature provoked Alan Grob to suggest that the two sets of poems should be known "as the Goslar lyrics of 1799".

== Early works ==
Besides an emphasis on nature, as Bennett Weaver points out, "The dominant theme of the poems of 1799 is death: death for the children of the village school, for Matthew's daughter, and for Lucy Gray."

In his "Preface to Lyrical Ballads", which is called the "manifesto" of English Romantic criticism, Wordsworth calls his poems "experimental". The year 1793 saw Wordsworth's first published poetry, with the volumes An Evening Walk and Descriptive Sketches. He received a legacy of £900 from Raisley Calvert in 1795 so that he could pursue writing poetry. That year, he met Samuel Taylor Coleridge in Somerset. The two poets quickly developed a close friendship. In 1797, Wordsworth and his sister Dorothy moved to Alfoxton House, Somerset, just a few miles away from Coleridge's home in Nether Stowey. Together, Wordsworth and Coleridge (with insights from Dorothy) produced Lyrical Ballads (1798), an important work in the English Romantic movement. The volume gave neither Wordsworth's nor Coleridge's name as author. One of Wordsworth's most famous poems, "Tintern Abbey", was published in the work, along with Coleridge's "The Rime of the Ancient Mariner". The second edition, published in 1800, had only Wordsworth listed as the author, and included a preface to the poems, which was augmented significantly in the 1802 edition. This Preface to Lyrical Ballads is considered a central work of Romantic literary theory. In it, Wordsworth discusses what he sees as the elements of a new type of poetry, one based on the "real language of men" and which avoids the poetic diction of much 18th-century poetry. Here, Wordsworth gives his famous definition of poetry as "the spontaneous overflow of powerful feelings: it takes its origin from emotion recollected in tranquility." A fourth and final edition of Lyrical Ballads was published in 1805.

=== Prelude ===
In 1799, Wordsworth completed a version of his Prelude, which was, according to Stephen Gill, "the most sustained self-examination in English poetry". In Wordsworth's 1799 Prelude, he attempted to write a biography about the growth of his mind from childhood to the current time. However, he realized that this could never be complete and wrote:

But who shall parcel out

His intellect by geometric rules,
Split like a province into round and square?
Who knows the individual hour in which
His habits were first sown even as a seed?
Who that shall point as with a wand, and say
'This portion of the river of my mind
Came from yon fountain'? (Prelude II 243–249)

The 1799 Prelude describes Wordsworth's early, happy moments in Cockermouth with a particular focus on the River Derwent and Cockermouth Castle. The poem transitions into the happy moments at Hawkshead, skipping over Wordsworth's experience with his mother's family, and only one scene containing his experience in Penrith was introduced in Book XII of the 1805 edition.
