= Thomas Letherbrow =

British antiquarian

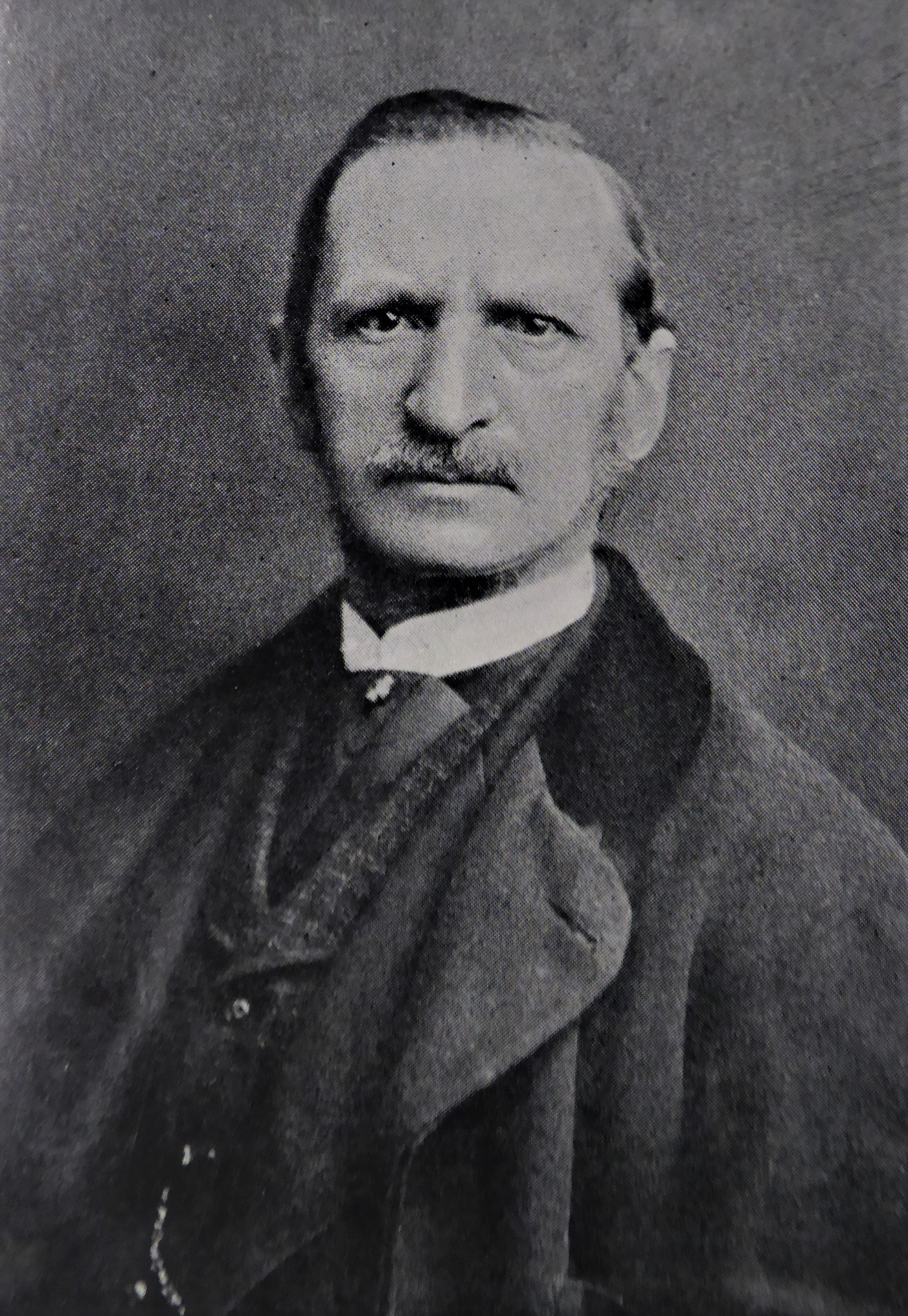
- Born: c. February 1825; Warrington, Cheshire, England
- Died: 1 January 1899 (aged 73); Alderley Edge, Cheshire, England

Thomas Letherbrow (1825–1899) was a British artist, poet, and antiquarian.

== Early life ==
Letherbrow was born in 1825 in Warrington, Cheshire, to John and Anne Letherbrow; he was baptised on 27 February. John Letherbrow was a wine merchant.

His younger brother, John Henry Letherbrow, also became an artist.

== Career ==
When life drawing classes were eliminated by the Manchester School of Design shortly after its foundation in 1838, a group of local artists—including Robert Crozier, Frederick Tavaré, and Warwick Brookes—founded the United Society of Manchester Artists in protest. The society held its own life drawing classes in a studio above a china shop on King Street, and the teenage Letherbrow became an early member; the society ran its classes until 1849, when life drawing was restored at the School of Design by James Astbury Hammersley, its president.

As a result, Letherbrow was highly integrated into mid-19th century Manchester's artistic and intellectual community, and he produced biographies for many of its more notable figures after their deaths—including Crozier, Brookes, William Hull, and even his own brother John Henry Letherbrow. He was also a friend of the Calvert family of Manchester—artists Charles and Michael Pease Calvert, actor Frederick Baltimore Calvert, and surgeon George Calvert—and his letters are an important source for later biographers.

As an artist he produced drawings, watercolours, oil paintings, and engravings; many of his works were produced as illustrations for essays or books. Topographical scenes of buildings and rural landscapes around Manchester and wider Lancashire were often his subjects, and he regularly exhibited his works in the city; his drawing of the Sun Inn, a pub popular with poets and writers, was included in the 1887 Royal Jubilee exhibition.

=== The Letherbrow Club ===
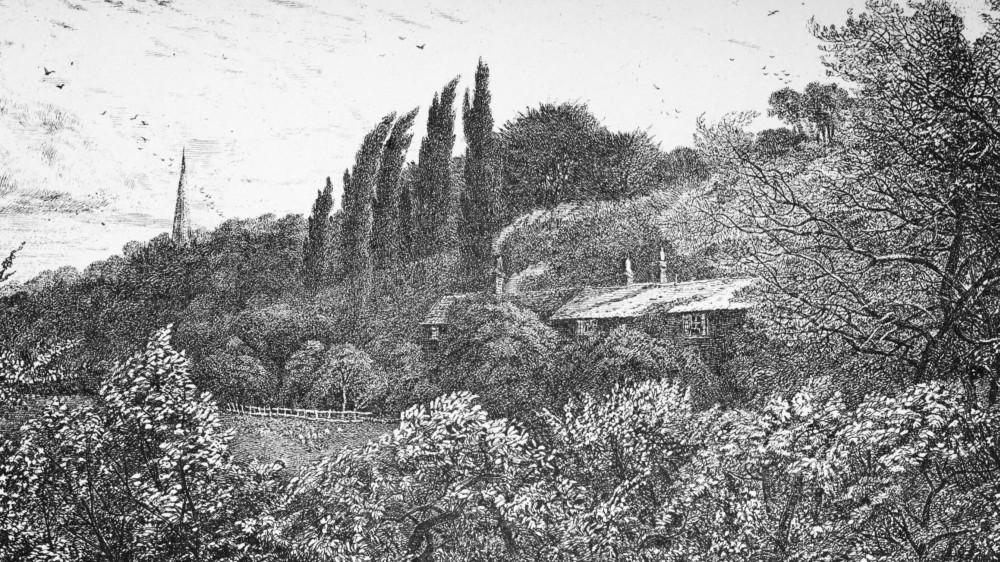
Oldfield, Dunham, an engraving by Letherbrow included in Leo H. Grindon's Country Rambles, and Manchester Walks and Wild Flowers (1882)

Letherbrow was a polymath whose interests ranged widely, from the arts and literature to archaeology and the sciences, and he contributed to antiquarian journals on a wide range of subjects. In 1848, aged only 23, Letherbrow established his own literary and artistic society called the Letherbrow Club—other members included artists William Hull, John Dawson Watson, and George Hayes, and antiquarian Joseph Perrin. Together they produced a journal, Transactions of the Letherbrow Club, which lasted 12 volumes before the club was dissolved. Letherbrow published most of his poetry within the pages of the Transactions.

In 1857 he edited the Manchester Exhibition Review, a one-off journal published to coincide with the Art Treasures Exhibition. He was also treasurer of the Lancashire and Cheshire Antiquarian Society from 1889 to his death.

== Personal life & death ==
Throughout his life Letherbrow held white collar jobs to supplement his income, including working as a post office clerk and a bank teller.

Letherbrow married Anne Hopps on 28 August 1858; they had two children, a son and a daughter. He died on New Year's Day in 1899, aged 73, at his home in Alderley Edge.

In response to his death the members of the Lancashire and Cheshire Antiquarian Society unanimously passed the following resolution:

That the members of the Lancashire and Cheshire Antiquarian Society desire to place on record their sense of the great loss which they have sustained by the death of their respected Treasurer, Mr. Thomas Letherbrow, who had been a member of the Society since December, 1885, and who had filled the office of Treasurer from January, 1889, to within a few weeks of his death. Mr. Letherbrow had won the esteem and confidence of all with whom he had been associated, whether in business, in social intercourse, or in the inner circle of friends drawn towards him by congenial tastes and pursuits. He was constant in his attendance at the meetings of the Society and of the Council, and his literary and artistic contributions added value to their published proceedings. His services as Honorary Treasurer were characterised by a close and efficient discharge of the duties of the office, and his intercourse with his fellow-members was marked by an unfailing courtesy.

Sonnets, Lyrics, and Ballads—a collection of his poetry, and including illustrations by John Henry Letherbrow—was published in 1910 by John Heywood Ltd.
