= Joseph Maiden (artist) =

English painter (1813–1843)

Joseph Maiden (1813–1843) was an English painter of livestock and hunting scenes.

== Early life ==
Maiden was born in Bury, Lancashire in 1813 to Henry Maiden, a coachman to Ellen Yates, widow of Sir Robert Peel, 1st Baronet. Maiden moved to Manchester to study under Charles Calvert, while his brother Joshua (also an artist) studied under Henry Calvert (no relation). He became a painter of new breeds of animals—particularly horses and dogs—and he also captured scenes from a series of hunts across Lancashire.

== Career ==
Maiden made his debut in 1832 at the Royal Manchester Institution, where he showcased Horses in a Thunderstorm. In 1840, he returned to the Institution, exhibiting Alpine Mastiffs. The piece was well-received, including one critic who indicated that "few artists could paint a dog with more force and truth;” the critic predicted that Maiden would have a successful career. The following year, he showcased his best-known work, The Bury Hunt, which he completed in collaboration with his brother-in-law, Charles Agar. The piece was sold at a raffle in 1841 with a ticket price of one guinea franc.

Though Maiden died in 1843, his work continued to be exhibited. In 1894, The Bury Hunt was shown at Bury Technical School, where it was described as "the most important local oil painting extant." The piece was sold in 1896 for 150 guinea francs.

In 1852, pictures of several pieces were showcased at the Bury Athenaeum, and in 1857 several pictures were showcased at the Peel Park Local Art Exhibition.

== Personal life and death ==
Maiden married one of his patron's lady's maids. The couple settled in Manchester and had one child.

He died from typhoid fever on 26 November 1843 in Manchester, at the age of 31. Following his death, a group of fellow local artists in Lancashire, as well as the president of the Royal Academy, came together to raise funds to support his widow. He is buried at St Luke's Church, Cheetham.
