= George Calvert (surgeon) =

British surgeon (1795–1825)

George Calvert (1795–1825) was a British surgeon.

== Biography ==
He was born in Manchester in September 1795, the second-youngest of eight children of Elizabeth Holliday and Charles Calvert, a steward for the Duke of Norfolk at Glossop Hall in Derbyshire; his other siblings included the painters Charles and Michael Pease Calvert, and the actor Frederick Baltimore Calvert. He moved to London to become a member of the Royal College of Surgeons in December 1816, and produced a translation of Xavier Bichat's Anatomie générale (1801).

He quickly developed a reputation as an impressive researcher, and gained particular acclaim after winning the Jacksonian Prize—awarded by the Royal College of Surgeons between 1800 and 1899 to the best treatise published that year by a fellow or member—three times in a row, the only person to do so in the prize's history. His winning essays were On Diseases of the Rectum in 1822, On Fungus Hæmotodes in 1823, and On Tic Douloureux in 1824, the second of which he republished in an expanded form in 1824, and which was described as the best account of the subject in the English language by the Medico-Chirurgical Review.

He died on 14 November 1825, aged 30. His obituary in The Gentleman's Magazine said that "the death of this gentleman will be a loss to the profession which he had chosen, and of which it was anticipated he would have become a distinguished ornament."
