= Tom Hadfield =

British businessman (born 1982)

- Born: 1982; Wakefield, England
- Occupation: Entrepreneur

Tom Hadfield (born 1982 in Wakefield, England) created Soccernet, a sports Internet company, with his father, Greg Hadfield, when he was 12 years old. Soccernet was later sold to ESPN for $40 million when he was 17 years old. Two years later, he and his father were able to raise millions of dollars to launch the education website Schoolsnet.com. In 2009, Tom Hadfield founded AeroDesigns, Inc after graduating from Harvard University, and became Chief Executive Officer.

In February 2002, Tom was named a 'Global Leader of Tomorrow' by the World Economic Forum in Davos. He is also a Patron of the UK National Youth Agency, and was a youth advisor to the National Endowment for Science, Technology and the Arts in the UK. He graduated from Harvard University in 2008.

In July 2006, Hadfield was selected as a Goldman Sachs Global Leader and attended the Global Leaders Institute in New York.

In 2015, Hadfield founded Mio. Mio powers seamless communication between Microsoft Teams, Slack, Webex, and Zoom. The Texas-based company was founded by Hadfield and James Cundle in November 2015. Mio raised $8.25m from investors including Goldcrest Capital, Eniac Ventures, Two Sigma Ventures, Khosla Ventures, Y Combinator, and Capital Factory. Mio raised a further $8.7m in December 2021.
