= Henry Calvert =

British animal painter

- Born: June 1798; Darlton, Nottinghamshire, England
- Died: 1 September 1868 (aged 70); Southport, Lancashire, England

Henry Calvert (1798–1868) was a British animal painter.

== Early life ==
Calvert was born in Darlton, Nottinghamshire, in June 1798 to William Calvert and Esther Callingham.

Henry Calvert was born in June 1798 in Darlton, Nottinghamshire, to William Calvert (1753–1837) and Esther Calvert (née Collingham, 1758–1825), who had married in Sutton-on-Trent on 25 July 1775. His parents were members of the local community who received the exceptional local honor of being buried within the physical walls of St. Giles' Church in Darlton. His mother Esther's gravestone is located against the south wall of the church tower, while his father William was laid to rest with a dedicated gravestone situated directly underneath the church altar.

Many sources from the late 19th century onwards claim that Calvert was a brother of Manchester artists Charles and Michael Pease Calvert. However, they were unrelated—Henry Calvert was born more than nine months after the death of the Manchester Calverts' father, with different parents named on his birth record. The error may have originated in John Howard Nodal's Art in Lancashire and Cheshire: a List of Deceased Artists (1884), the source used for Charles Calvert's entry in the Dictionary of National Biography. Henry Calvert and the other Calverts were of similar ages, and all were working and exhibiting in Manchester during the same period, but there is no mention of Henry as their sibling in sources discussing the Manchester Calverts during their respective lifetimes.

== Career ==
Calvert moved to Manchester, where he became a professional artist specialising in oil paintings of animals, including livestock and hunts, across Lancashire, Cheshire, and northern Wales.

His most notable painting was The Cheshire Hunt (1840), a large canvas depicting more than 40 different people—all of whom sat for Calvert—preparing for a hunt near Beeston Castle, which took him a year to paint and was exhibited in Manchester, Liverpool, and London; mezzotint prints were produced and sold by Thomas Agnew & Sons. It now hangs in the entrance of Tatton Hall in Cheshire, the former home of the noble Egerton family, some of whom were included in the painting. The Vine Hunt Meeting (1843) and The Wynnstay Hunt (1855) are other notable hunt paintings by Calvert.

He exhibited regularly at the Royal Manchester Institution; when he exhibited two dog paintings, Dandie Dinmont Family and Varmint, in 1848, the Manchester Courier described him as the third-best canine painter in the country (with Edwin Landseer in first place).

He was the founding treasurer of the Manchester Academy of Fine Arts in 1859. Joshua Maiden, a brother of Joseph Maiden, was his pupil.

== Death ==
He died in Southport on 1 September 1868, aged 70, and was buried in Sale, Manchester alongside his wife Mary.

In 1971, an exhibition of equestrian paintings was held at the Adelphi Hotel in Liverpool to coincide with the Grand National at nearby Aintree, and it included paintings by Calvert; the curators believed him to be "a first-class painter, only overlooked because so many other artists of his time were also painting horses," and deserving of rediscovery.

The Dictionary of British Equestrian Artists (1985) describes him as "a comparatively little known and underestimated artist whose ability deserves greater recognition. His work is of a high standard, his horses well drawn, his composition good and his detail of items such as saddlery is accurate; as well as painting horses and sporting scenes he painted a variety of other animals including cattle portraits, and a few landscapes. Although he would seem to have led a fairly active artistic life his work is now fairly rare."
