= Thomas Henry Illidge =

English painter (1799–1851)

Thomas Henry Illidge (26 September 1799 – 13 May 1851) was an English portrait painter.

== Life and work ==
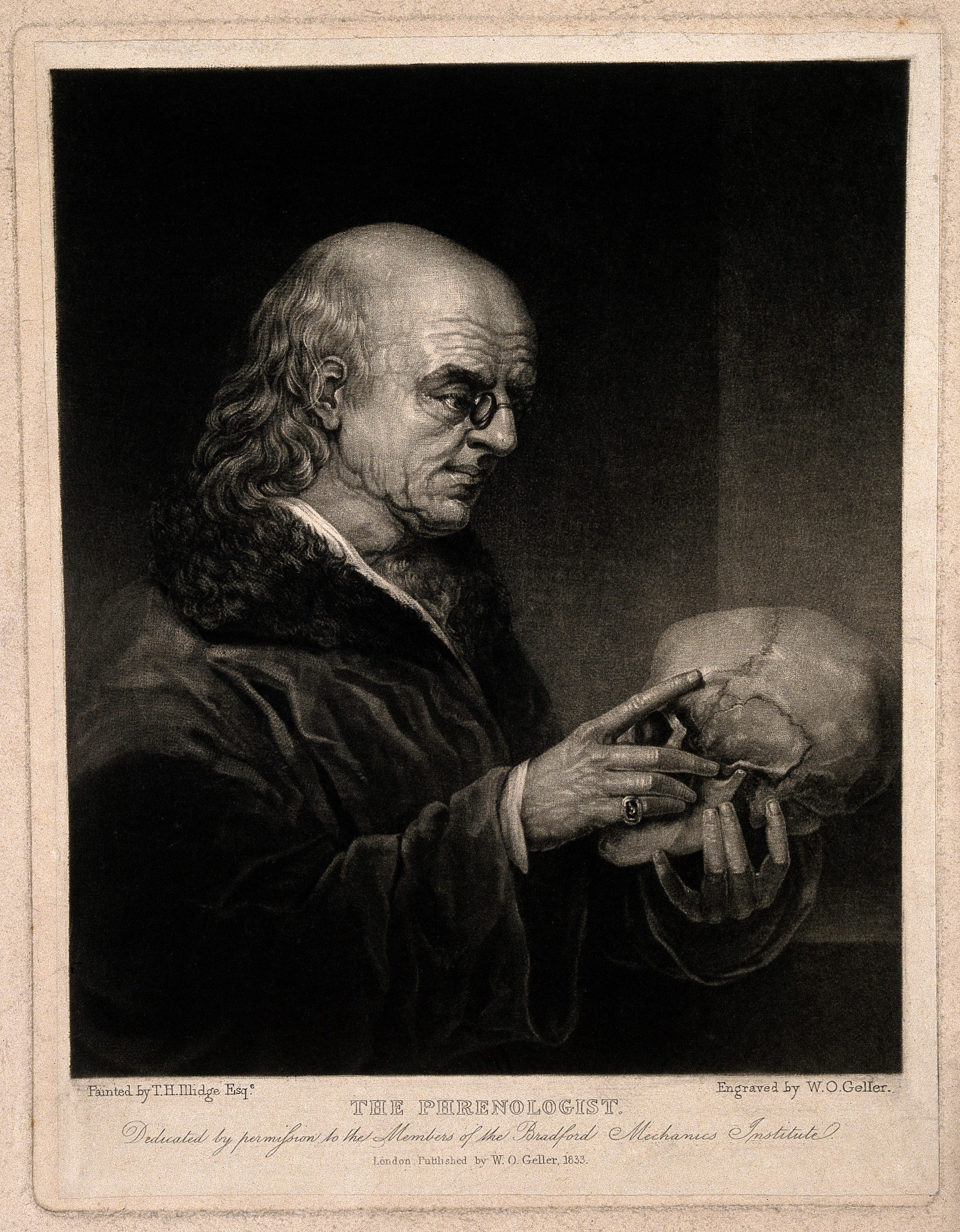
Sample of his work: A mezzotint by William Overend Geller of a painting by Illidge

Illidge was born in Birmingham on 26 September 1799, belonging to a family resident near Nantwich, Cheshire. Illidge's father moved to Manchester, and, dying young, left a young family ill-provided for. Illidge was educated in Manchester, and taught drawing. He was subsequently the pupil in succession of Mather Brown and William Bradley. He initially tried landscape painting, but married early, and, as a result, took up portrait-painting as a more profitable endeavour.

Illidge was successful as a portrait-painter in the great manufacturing towns of Lancashire, painting many of the civic or financial celebrities of the locality. He was a frequent exhibitor at the Liverpool Academy from 1827. In 1842, he came to London, and was from that time was a constant exhibitor at the Royal Academy. In 1844, on the death of Henry Perronet Briggs, R.A., Illidge purchased the lease of the deceased artist's house in Bruton Street, Berkeley Square, where he commenced practice as a popular and fashionable portrait-painter.

Illidge died unexpectedly of fever, on 13 May 1851.
