= Charles Hadfield (journalist) =

Charles Hadfield (1821–1884) was a journalist.

Hadfield, the son of Charles and Anne Hadfield, was born in Glossop, Derbyshire, 14 October 1821, and being taken to Manchester when only one year old, was brought up to the trade of a house-painter and decorator, becoming specially skilled in graining, and able to imitate the grain of the oak with great perfection. At an early age he wrote verses in the Manchester Times, and his tastes soon led him to adopt literature as a profession. In 1861 he edited a monthly paper in connection with trades unions, called Weekly Wages, of which only five numbers appeared. He then, in 1861, accepted an offer of Joseph Cowen, M.P., to join the staff of the Newcastle Chronicle, and to act as lecturing agent for the Northern Reform Union.

Returning to Manchester in January 1862, he became connected with the commercial department of the Manchester Examiner and Times. After this he was employed as a writer for the Manchester City News, and subsequently edited that paper from 1865 to 1867, and remained connected with it as a contributor for two or three years longer. He next went to Glasgow, where for a short time he was on the staff of the Glasgow Herald, and then took the editorship and management of the Warrington Examiner and other papers connected with it, including the Mid-Cheshire Examiner. After several years in this position he was presented with a testimonial. Finally in 1880 he was editor of the Salford Weekly News, in which position he remained to the beginning of 1883. As a journalist his strength lay in his great knowledge of the habits, the wants, and the aspirations of the working classes, and on these subjects his writings were always thoughtful and suggestive. From 22 December 1867 to 4 July 1868 he contributed to the Free Lance, and from 25 July 1868 to 28 October 1871 to The Sphinx, two Manchester literary, artistic, and humorous journals. He was an advocate of the Manchester Fine Art Gallery, and took part in securing the Saturday half-holiday, and in providing public baths and washhouses.

After his retirement he was confined to his room by ill-health, and died at 3 Chester Road, Stretford, 4 June 1884.

He was the author of two prize essays:

1. The Best Means of Enlarging the Usefulness of Mechanics' Institutions, 1850. 2. and
2. Suggestions for Improving the Homes of the Working Classes, about 1857.

On 24 December 1843 he married Emily Frances, daughter of John Pontey and Mary Ann Kemp.
