= Manchester City News =

Former weekly newspaper in Manchester, England

Manchester City News was a weekly local newspaper founded in Manchester, England, and published every Saturday. The first edition went on sale on 2 January 1864, priced at one penny. The newspaper was circulated not only in Manchester and neighbouring Salford but also more widely throughout the towns of Lancashire and Cheshire. It focused largely on commercial and local issues such as meetings of the town council and proceedings in the law courts, but it also included some more general news and book reviews.

The journalist Charles Hadfield edited the paper from 1865 until 1867, and remained a contributor for two or three years after giving up that role, but by 1871 the newspaper was struggling. Its fortunes were reversed by the appointment of John Howard Nodal as editor, and the content soon began to reflect his wide-ranging interest in the work being carried out locally in the fields of science, literature, and language. Two of the sections he introduced into the newspaper, "City News Notes and Queries" (Note: Nodal based the section on Notes and Queries, to which he contributed regularly.) and "Outdoor Notes: a Journal of Natural History and Out-Door Observation" – both of which he edited himself – evolved to become independent publications. Nodal remained editor of the Manchester City News until 1904. J. Cuming Walters was editor from 1906 to 1932.

During the First World War the price of paper pulp was controlled, and the Manchester City News was able to hold its price at 1 1/2 pence, but paper shortages following the cessation of hostilities forced the price to be doubled in 1920.

The newspaper was published under its original title until 28 August 1936. It was the City News for a little more than a year before continuing as the Manchester City News from 13 November 1937 to 29 April 1955. Renamed again, it became the City & Suburban News until August 1958, and then spent short periods as the Lancashire County Express, County Express, and Manchester County Express, until August 1960, when it was replaced by north and south editions, which were published until the end of 1963.
