= John Howard Nodal =

John Howard Nodal (1831–1909) was an English journalist, linguistic and writer on dialect.

== Life ==
He was son of Aaron Nodal (1798–1855), of the Society of Friends, a grocer and member of the Manchester town council. Born in Downing Street, Ardwick, Manchester, on 19 September 1831, he was educated at Ackworth School, Yorkshire (1841–5). At seventeen he became a clerk of the Electric Telegraph Company, and rose to be manager of the news department in Manchester. From the age of nineteen he also acted as secretary of the Manchester Working Men's College, subsequently absorbed in Owens College.

Nodal began early to contribute to the local press. During the volunteer movement of 1860–2 he edited the Volunteer Journal, and in January 1864 he was appointed sub-editor of the Manchester Courier on its first appearance as a daily paper. From 1867 to 1870 he was engaged on the Manchester Examiner and Times. Meanwhile, he edited the Free Lance, a literary and humorous weekly (1866–8), and a similar paper called the Sphinx (1868–71). For thirty-three years (1871–1904) he was editor of the Manchester City News, which became the recognised organ of the literary and scientific societies of Lancashire. Many series of articles were reprinted from it in volume form. Two of these, ‘Manchester Notes and Queries' (1878–89, 8 vols.) and ‘Country Notes: a Journal of Natural History and Out-Door Observation' (1882–3, 2 vols.), developed into independent periodicals. Nodal was also a frequent contributor to Notes and Queries, and from 1875 to 1885 was on the staff of the Saturday Review.

He was president (1873–9) of the Manchester Literary Club, and started its annual volumes of ‘Papers' which he edited for those years. He was mainly instrumental in founding the Manchester Arts Club in 1878. For the glossary committee of the Literary Club he wrote in 1873 a paper on the ‘Dialect and Archaisms of Lancashire,' and, in conjunction with George Milner, compiled a ‘Glossary of the Lancashire Dialect' (2 parts, 1875–82). When the headquarters of the English Dialect Society were moved in 1874 from Cambridge to Manchester, Nodal became honorary secretary and director. He continued in office to the dissolution of the society in 1896. With W. W. Skeat he compiled a ‘Bibliographical List of Works illustrative of the various English Dialects,' 1877. His other works include:

- ‘Special Collections of Books in Lancashire and Cheshire,' prepared for the Library Association, 1880.
- ‘Art in Lancashire and Cheshire: a List of Deceased Artists,' 1884.
- ‘A Pictorial Record of the Royal Jubilee Exhibition, Manchester,' 1887.
- ‘Bibliography of Ackworth School,' 1889.

He died at the Grange, Heaton Moor, near Manchester, on 13 November 1909, and was interred at the Friends' burial-ground, Ashton-on-Mersey. He married, firstly, Helen, daughter of Lawrence Wilkinson, by whom he had two sons and three daughters; and secondly, Edith, daughter of Edmund and Anne Robinson of Warrington.

Nodal's papers are held by the John Rylands Library, Manchester.
