= Glossop Hall =

Former building in Glossop, England

Coordinates: 53°26′55″N 1°56′39″W

- external image
- Glossop Hall, c 1910s

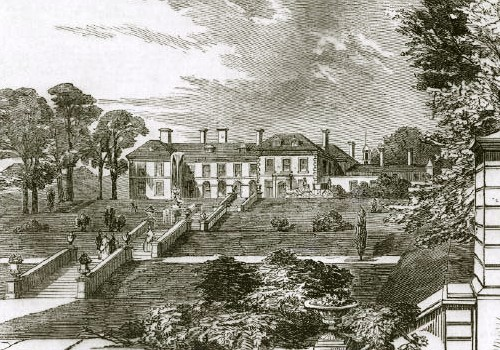
Glossop Hall in the 1800s. It was first called Royle Hall.

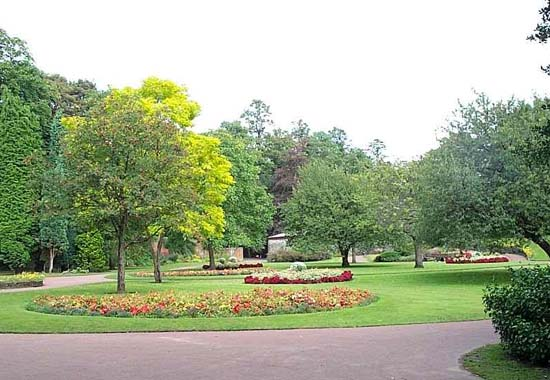
Manor Park

Glossop Hall was the last residential building on the site of Royle Hall in Glossop, Derbyshire. It was located south of Old Glossop at the heart of Glossop, before the centre of the town shifted south to Norfolk Square, near the railway station, in the nineteenth century. It was a residence used by members of the Howard family.

Glossop Hall, originally called Royle Hall, was built by Lord of the Manor Ralph Standish-Howard from 1729 to 1735.

It reverted back to the Ninth Duke of Norfolk when the Standish-Howard line ended in the late 1730s.

It was used as a hunting lodge by Phillipa Howard, daughter of Henry Howard, 6th Duke of Norfolk, and her husband. The building as shown was only used for part of the year.

The Duke of Norfolk used Glossop Hall as a shooting lodge and so it remained unoccupied for most of the year.

The Hall was renovated c 1850; the left side, south wing, was enlarged but still looked very similar and the right, the north wing wall shown, was removed and a wing built matching the left side; the part projecting was built as a chapel with a conical tower.

The Hall was rebuilt around 1870 by Lord Howard of Glossop.

The Hall was sold to the council in 1924, it became Kingsmoor School (1926-1946)

Kingsmoor School offered places to refugees in 1938 and 1939, thus gaining their right of entry to Britain.

The Hall was demolished around in 1958-59.

The land where the house formerly stood is now occupied by a small housing estate with road names such as Old Hall Close and Park Close. The original terraced gardens now form Manor Park.

== Sources ==
- Robinson, John (2011). Felling the Ancient Oaks. Aurum Press. ISBN 978-1845136703.
