= The Castle of Ischia from the Mole, Italy =

Painting by Clarkson Stanfield

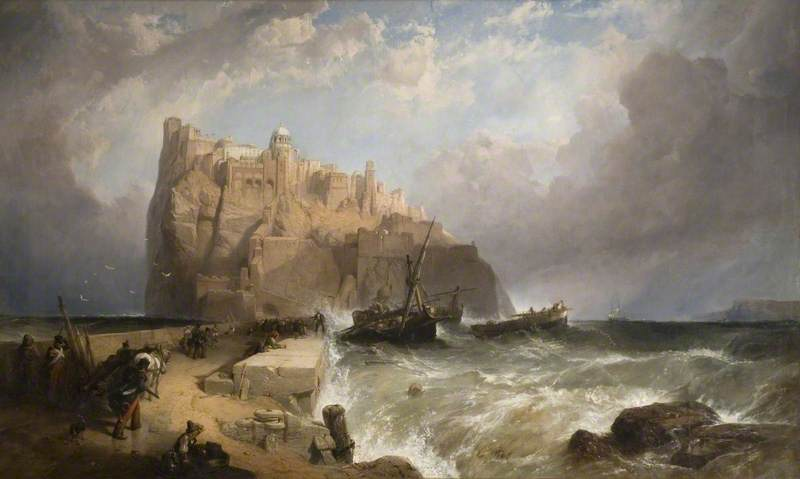
- Artist: Clarkson Stanfield
- Year: 1841
- Medium: Oil on canvas, landscape painting
- Dimensions: 143 cm × 230 cm (56 in × 91 in)
- Location: Museum and Winter Gardens, Sunderland

The Castle of Ischia from the Mole, Italy is an 1841 landscape painting by the British artist Clarkson Stanfield. It shows a view of a castle on the island of Ischia in the Tyrrhenian Sea. The work was inspired by a trip Stanfield made to Naples in 1838 where he had made sketches of the island.

The painting was displayed at the Royal Academy Exhibition of 1841 at the National Gallery in London, where it enjoyed success. It became a widely known image although John Ruskin offered only moderate praise, suggesting "a little more savageness in the sea, would have made it an impressive picture: it just misses the sublime". It subsequently appeared at Salon of 1855 in Paris. The picture is now in the collection of the Museum and Winter Gardens in Stanfield's native Sunderland.

== Bibliography ==
- Bury, Stephen (ed.) Benezit Dictionary of British Graphic Artists and Illustrators, Volume 1. OUP, 2012.
- Maas, Jeremy. Victorian Painters. Barrie & Jenkins, 1978.
- Van der Merwe, Pieter & Took, Roger. The Spectacular career of Clarkson Stanfield. Tyne and Wear County Council Museums, 1979.
