= The Repentant Prodigal's Return to His Father =

Painting by William Etty

The Repentant Prodigal's Return to his Father
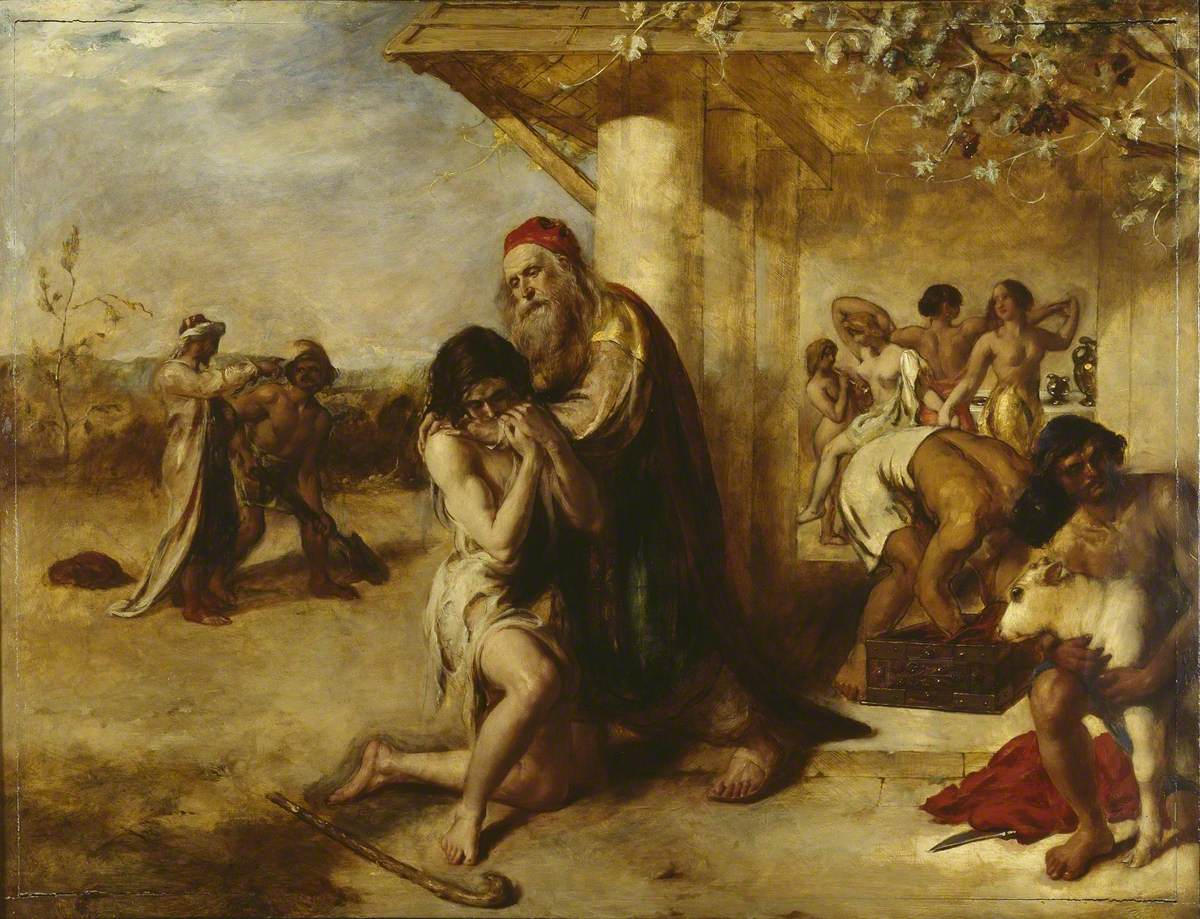
- Artist: William Etty
- Year: 1841
- Type: Oil on panel, history painting
- Dimensions: 85 cm × 114 cm (33 in × 45 in)
- Location: Ashmolean Museum, Oxford

The Repentant Prodigal's Return to his Father is a 1841 history painting by the British artist William Etty. It depicts the biblical story of the prodigal son. Etty was well known for his nude art, that often featured in his history and religious scenes such as this.

The painting was displayed at the Royal Academy Exhibition of 1841 held at the National Gallery in London, where it was a major triumph for Etty. It was subsequently donated to the Ashmolean Museum in Oxford in 1937.

== Bibliography ==
- Robinson, Leonard. William Etty: The Life and Art. McFarland, 2007.
