= Portrait of Countess Jermyn =

1839 painting by Francis Grant

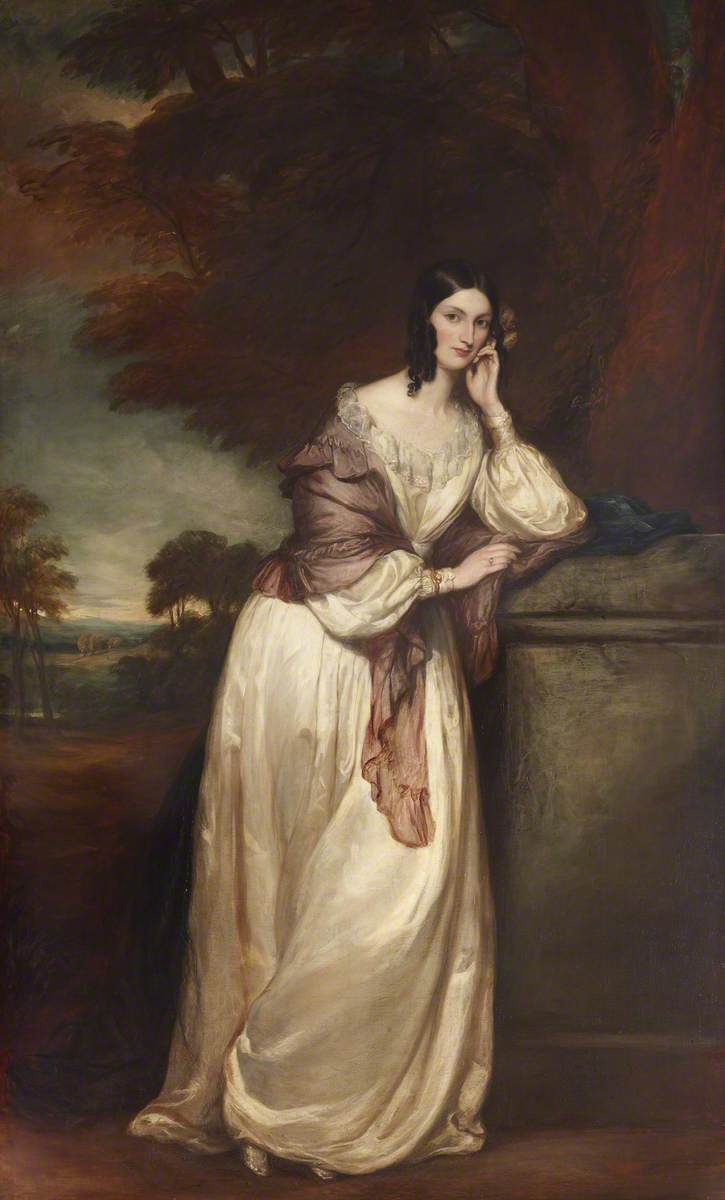
- Artist: Francis Grant
- Year: 1839
- Type: Oil on canvas, portrait painting
- Dimensions: 236.2 cm × 144.8 cm (93.0 in × 57.0 in)
- Location: Ickworth House, Suffolk

Portrait of Countess Jermyn is an 1839 portrait painting by the British artist Francis Grant. A full-length oil painting, it depicts Katherine, Countess of Jermyn. A prominent member of the British aristocracy, she was the daughter of the Duke of Rutland and the wife of the Earl of Jermyn. The picture shows the strong influence of Thomas Gainsborough on Grant at the time.

Grant, who had recently emerged as a notable painter, was celebrated for his portraits of High Society figures that harked back to Thomas Lawrence in the Regency era. Grant enjoyed great success in the Victorian period and was later elected President of the Royal Academy. This painting was commissioned by her husband for 200 guineas as a pendant to his own picture by Grant. Both hung at the family's country estate Ickworth House in Suffolk. The painting was displayed at the Royal Academy Exhibition of 1841 at the National Gallery in London. It remains in the collection at Ickworth, now administered by the National Trust.

== Bibliography ==
- Wills, Catherine. High Society: The Life and Art of Sir Francis Grant, 1803–1878. National Galleries of Scotland, 2003.
