= Glaucus and Scylla =

Painting by J. M. W. Turner

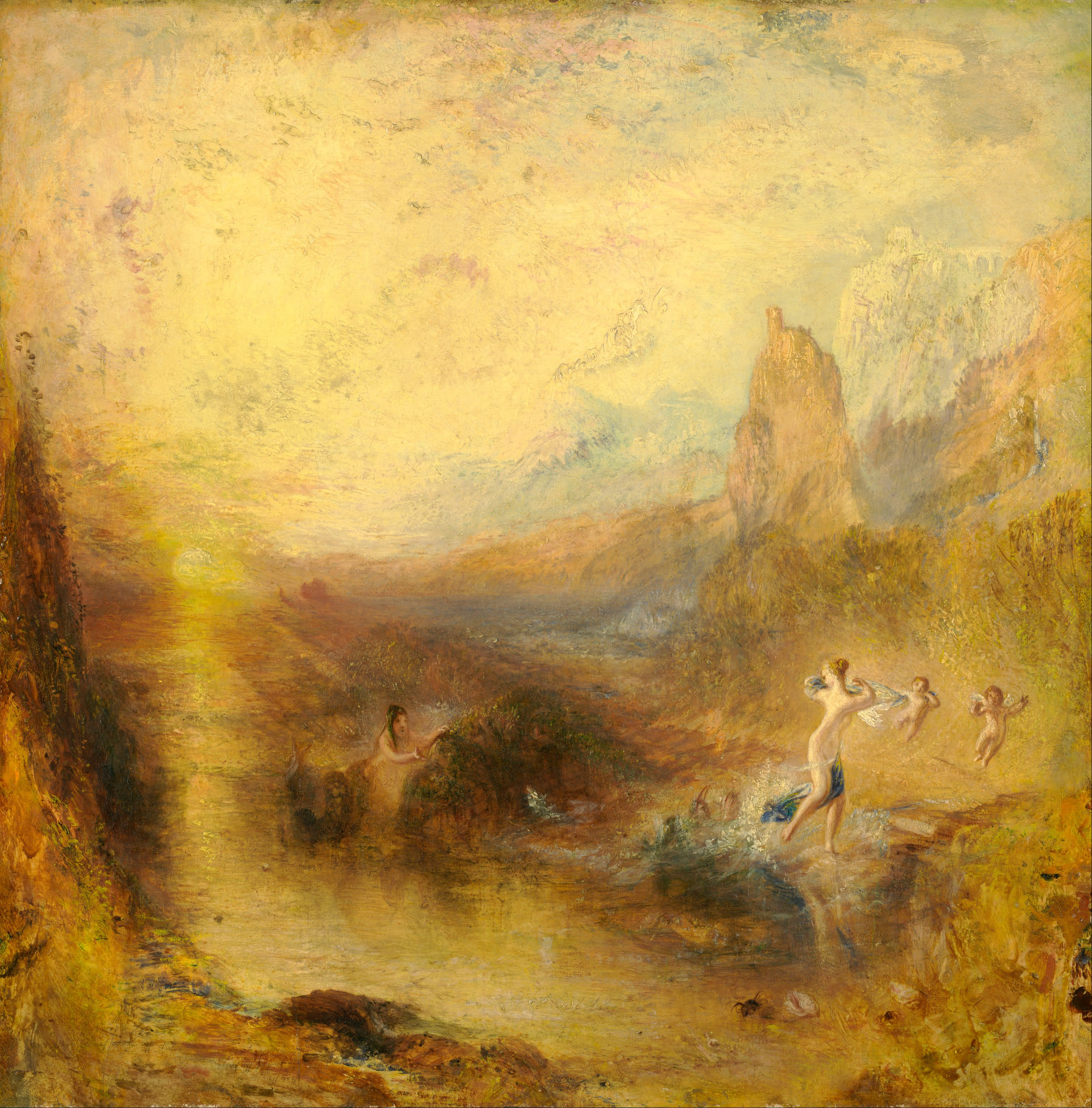
- Artist: J.M.W. Turner
- Year: 1841
- Type: Oil on panel, history painting
- Dimensions: 77 cm × 78 cm (30 in × 31 in)
- Location: Kimbell Art Museum, Fort Worth

Glaucus and Scylla is an 1841 oil painting by the English artist J.M.W. Turner. Entering the last decade of his career, Turner was a pillar of the British romantic movement, while experimenting increasingly in abstract compositions. This painting in inspired by a classical story from Ovid’s Metamorphoses in which the ocean-dwelling Glaucus is thwarted in his desire for the beautiful nymph Scylla by the jealous Circe who transforms him into a sea monster to scare her. As often with Turner he combines a classical scene with Romanticism.

It was the pendant piece to his painting Dawn of Christianity also known as Flight into Egypt, although it has been suggested that Turner may have originally considered it a companion work to his Bacchus and Ariadne. The picture was displayed at the Royal Academy Exhibition of 1841 held at the National Gallery in London. Today it is part of the collection of the Kimbell Art Museum in Fort Worth in Texas, having been acquired in 2007.

== See also ==
- List of paintings by J. M. W. Turner

== Bibliography ==
- Bailey, Anthony. J.M.W. Turner: Standing in the Sun. Tate Enterprises Ltd, 2013.
- Finley, Gerald. Angel in the Sun: Turner's Vision of History. McGill-Queen's Press, 1999.
- Hamilton, James (ed.) Turner and Italy. National Galleries of Scotland, 2009.
- Loud, Patricia. , Sano, Emily, Pillsbury, Edmund. & Jordan, William (ed.) In Pursuit of Quality: The Kimbell Art Museum : an Illustrated History of the Art and Architecture. Kimbell Art Museum, 1987.
