= The Temptation of Andrew Marvell =

Painting by Charles Landseer

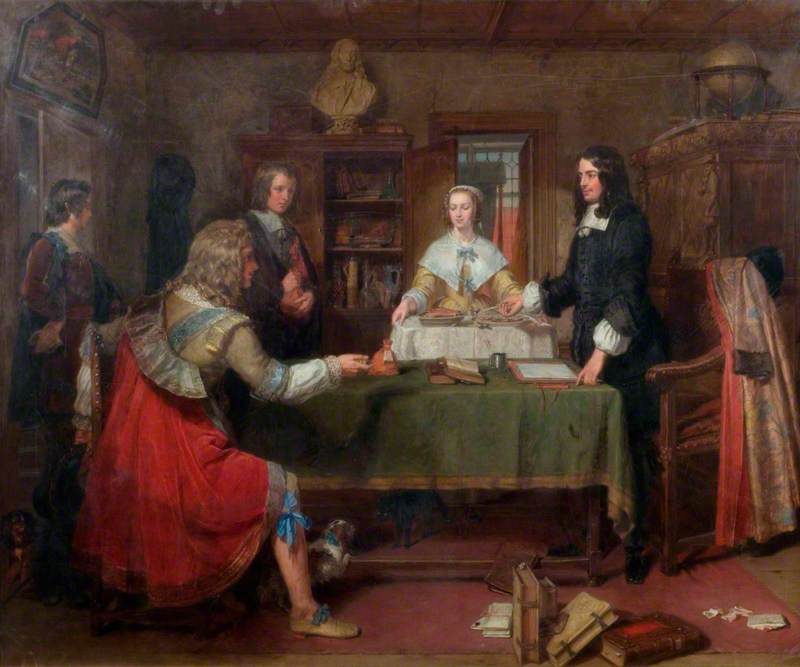
- Artist: Charles Landseer
- Year: 1841
- Type: Oil on canvas, history painting
- Dimensions: 101.6 cm × 126.9 cm (40.0 in × 50.0 in)
- Location: Victoria and Albert Museum, London

The Temptation of Andrew Marvell is an 1841 history painting by the British artist Charles Landseer. It depicts a scene from the seventeenth century during the Restoration era, when the poet Andrew Marvell conspicuously refuses an attempted bribe to bring him over to the side of Charles II. Set in Marvell's modest lodgings in Maiden Lane in Covent Garden it shows the stark contrast of the black-clad republican Marvell and the King's agent Lord Danby the influential politician and minister in his fashionable dress. The offer was a thousand guineas, a colossal sum at the time, which Marvell rejected by pointing out his humble dinner.

Landseer was the elder brother of the celebrated animal painter Edwin Landseer who was noted for his scenes from British history. The painting was displayed at the Royal Academy Exhibition of 1841 held at the National Gallery in London. It was acquired by the art collector John Sheepshanks who in 1857 donated it to the Victoria and Albert Museum as part of the large Sheepshanks Gift.

== Bibliography ==
- Augustine, Matthew C., Pertile, Giulio J. & Zwicker, Steven N. Imagining Andrew Marvell at 400. Oxford University Press, 2023.
- Parkinson, Ronald. Catalogue of British Oil Paintings 1820-1860. Victoria and Albert Museum, 1990.
- Roe, Sonia. Oil Paintings in Public Ownership in the Victoria and Albert Museum. Public Catalogue Foundation, 2008.
