= The Sleeping Beauty (Maclise) =

Painting by Daniel Maclise

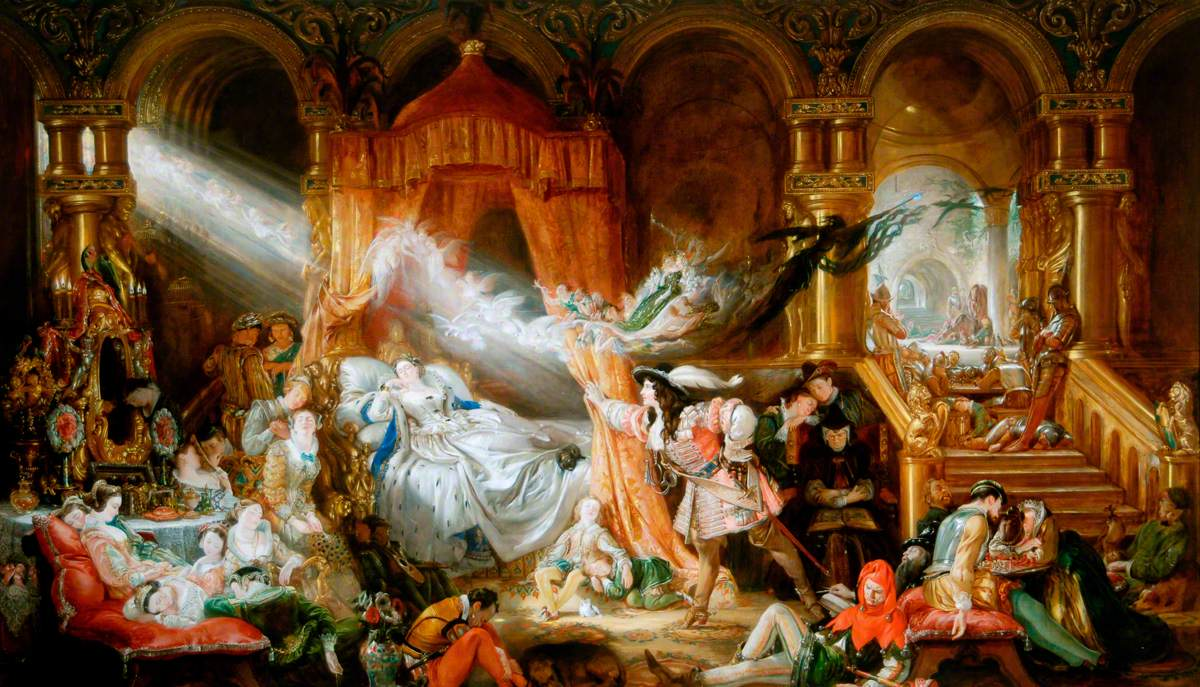
- Artist: Daniel Maclise
- Year: 1841
- Type: Oil on canvas, history painting
- Dimensions: 126 cm × 212 cm (50 in × 83 in)
- Location: Hartlepool Art Gallery, County Durham

The Sleeping Beauty is an 1841 oil painting by the Irish artist Daniel Maclise. It portrays a scene from the traditional French fairytale "Sleeping Beauty". It was inspired in particular by a version by James Planché which had opened at the Theatre Royal, Covent Garden on 20 April 1840. Maclise discussed the painting with his friend Charles Dickens, who made suggestions about the dreamlike expressions.

The painting was displayed at the Royal Academy Exhibition of 1841 held at the National Gallery in London. Today it is in the collection of the Hartlepool Art Gallery, having been acquired in 1920.

== Bibliography ==
- Gager, Valerie L. Shakespeare and Dickens: The Dynamics of Influence. Cambridge University Press, 1996.
- Murray, Peter. Daniel Maclise, 1806-1870: Romancing the Past. University of Michigan, 2008. .
- Weston, Nancy. Daniel Maclise: Irish Artist in Victorian London. Four Courts Press, 2001.
