= Royal Academy Exhibition of 1841 =

1841 art exhibition in London

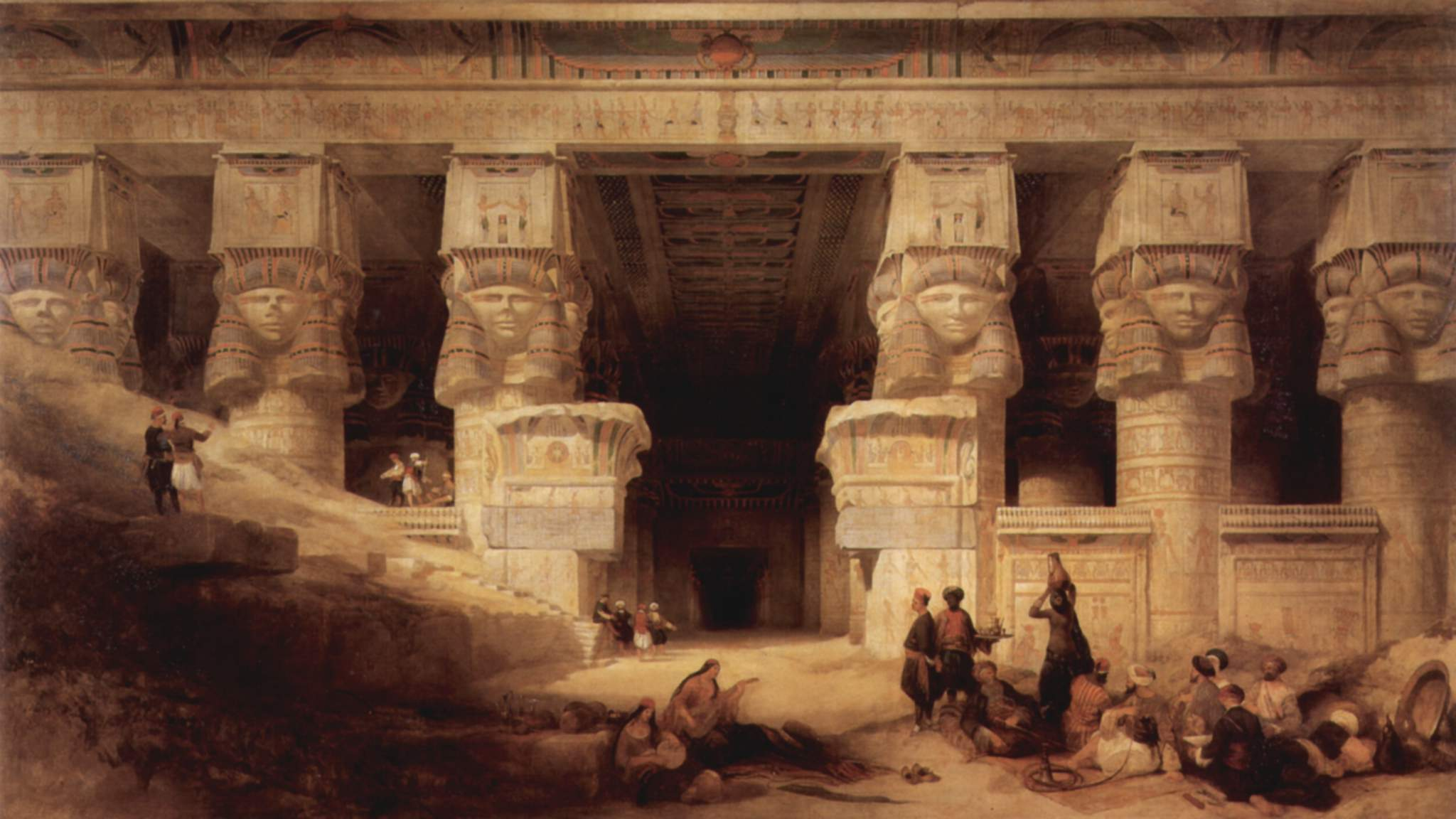
The Temple of Dendera by David Roberts

The Royal Academy Exhibition of 1841 was the seventy third annual Summer Exhibition of the British Royal Academy of Arts. It was held at the National Gallery in London from 3 May to 24 July 1841 and featured submissions from leading painters, sculptors and architects of the early Victorian era. A critic lamented the absence of the late John Constable and other figures such as Augustus Wall Callcott.

By the final decade of his career, Turner was Britain's leading artists and his annual submissions were often the most-discussed paintings of the exhibition. In 1841 he displayed six oil paintings several inspired by a recent trip to Venice. Amongst them was the German landscape Schloss Rosenau, an attempt to win royal patronage as it was the family residence of Queen Victoria's new consort Prince Albert.

Irish artist Daniel Maclise displayed the large painting The Sleeping Beauty. William Etty enjoyed success with the biblical scene The Repentant Prodigal's Return to His Father. The President of the Royal Academy Sir Martin Archer Shee was amongst several portraitists to submit work. In sculpture Francis Chantrey displayed statues of two prominent bishops.

== Gallery ==
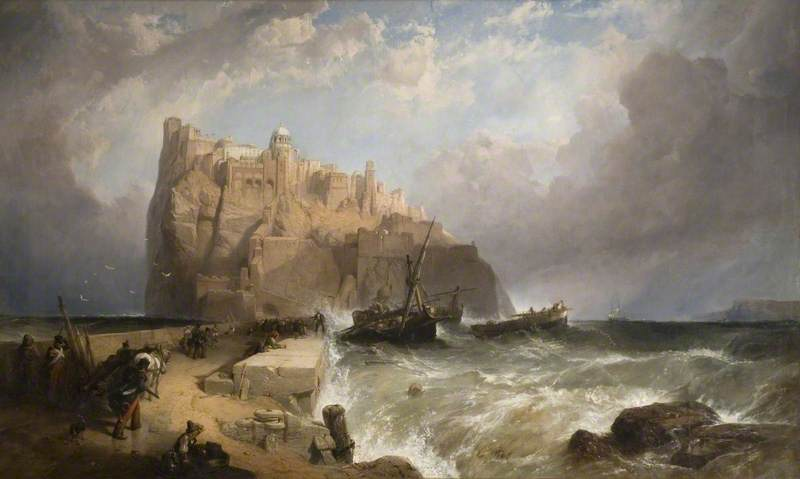
The Castle of Ischia from the Mole, Italy by Clarkson Stanfield

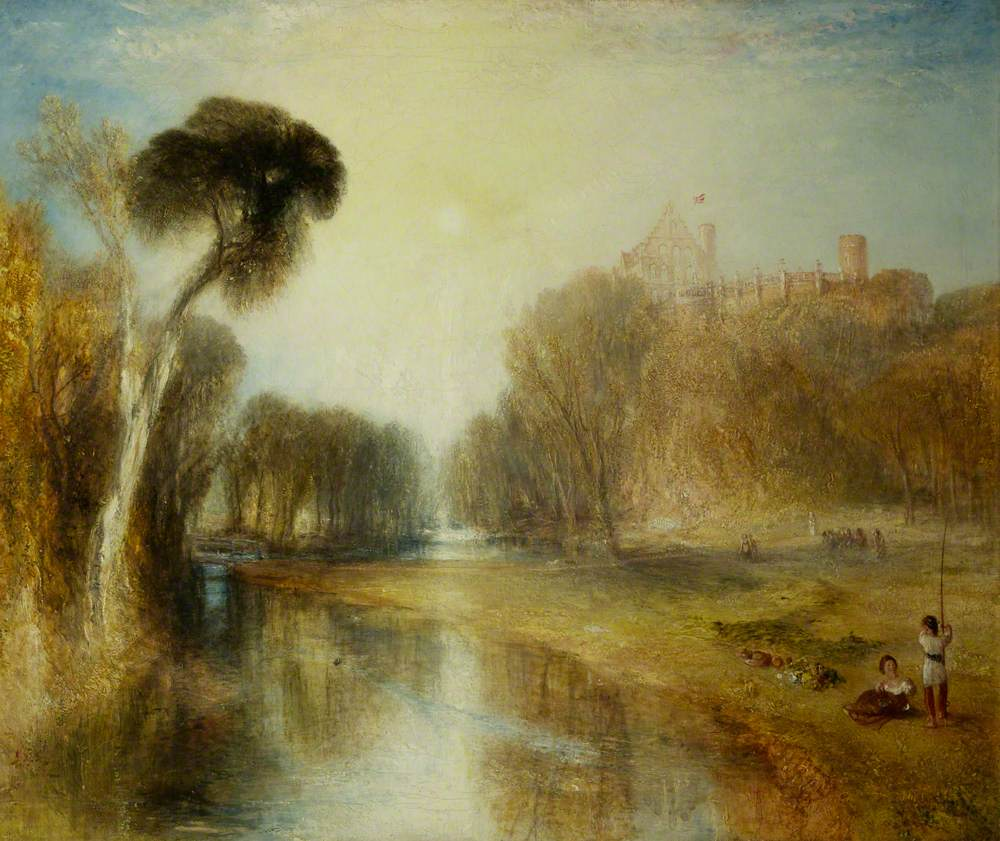
Schloss Rosenau by J.M.W. Turner

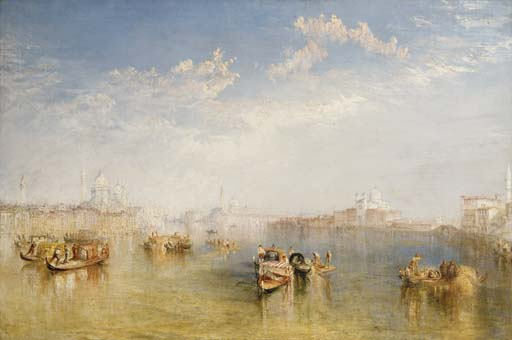
Giudecca, La Donna della Salute and San Giorgio and J.M.W. Turner

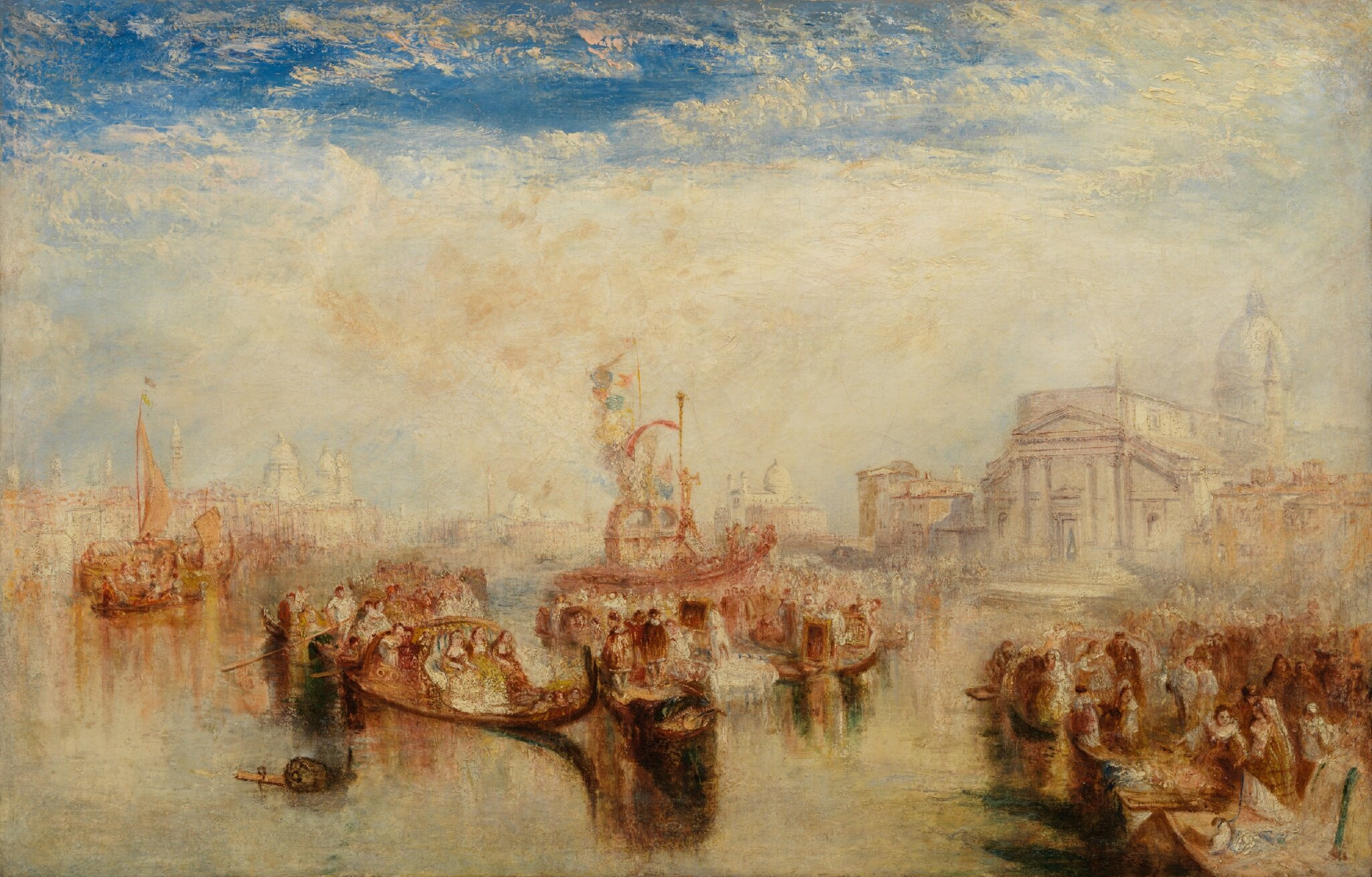
Depositing of John Bellini's Three Pictures in La Chiesa Redentore, Venice by J.M.W. Turner

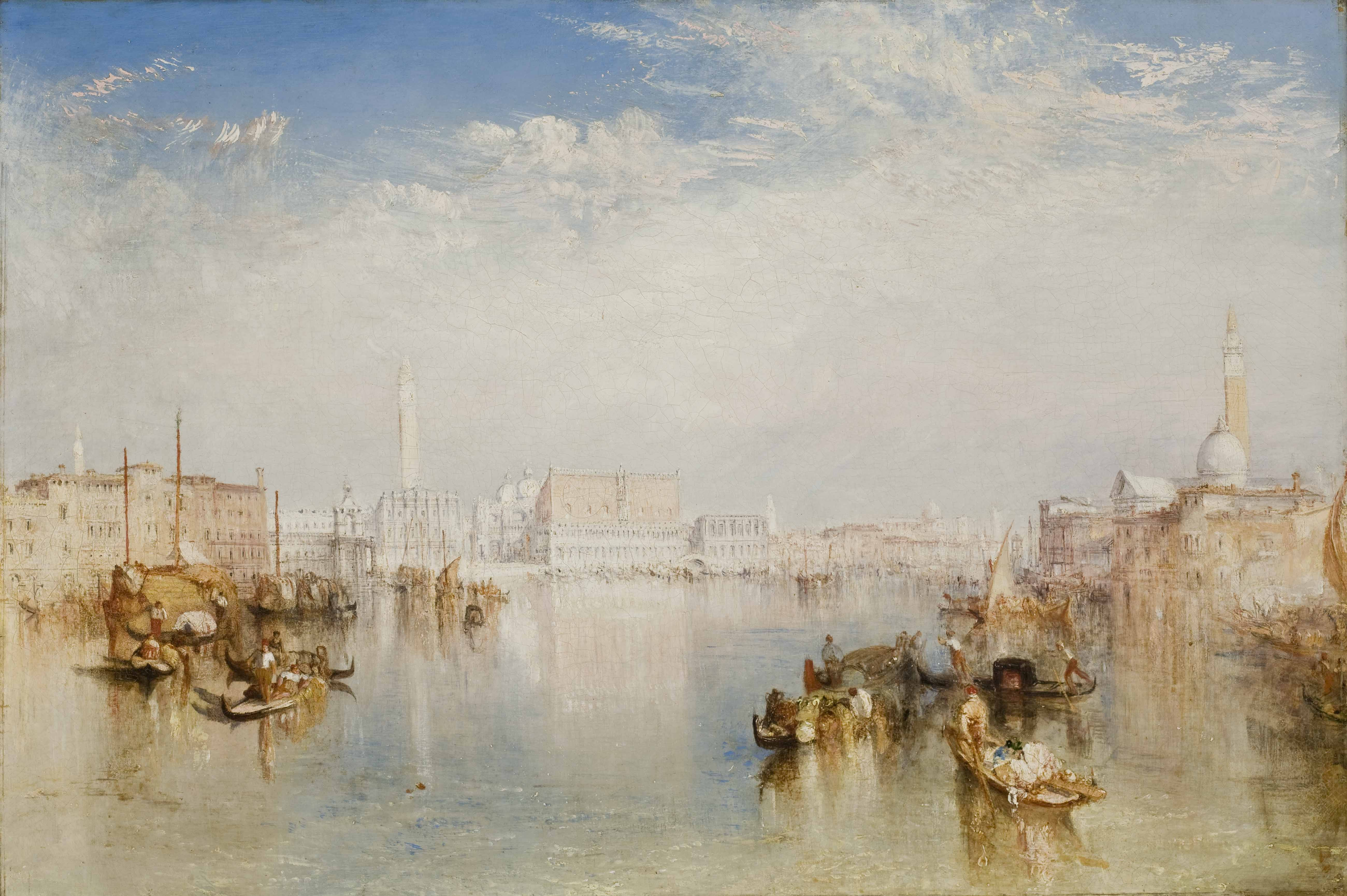
The Ducal Palace, Dogana and Part of San Giorgio by J.M.W. Turner

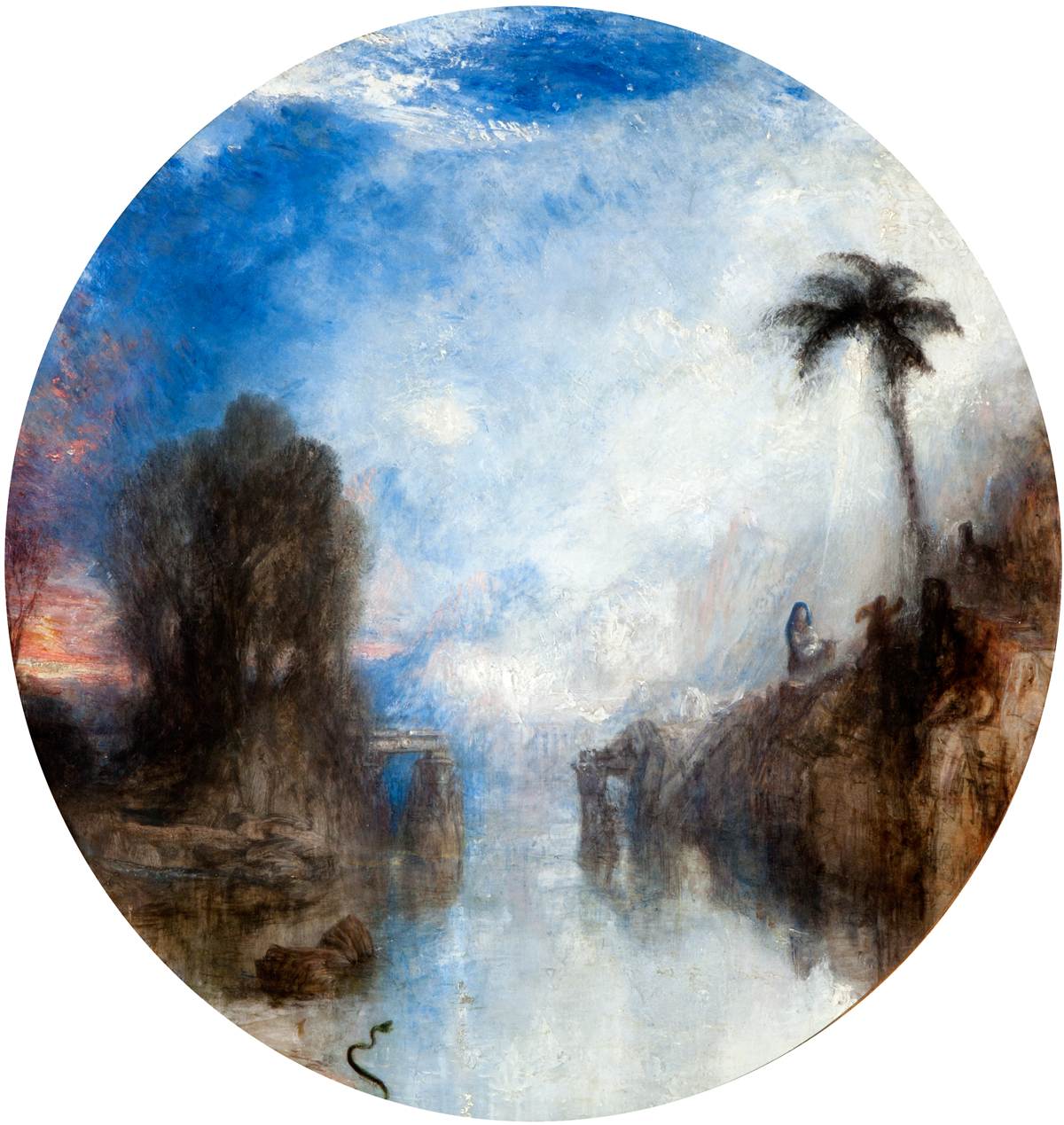
The Dawn of Christianity (The Flight into Egypt) by J.M.W. Turner

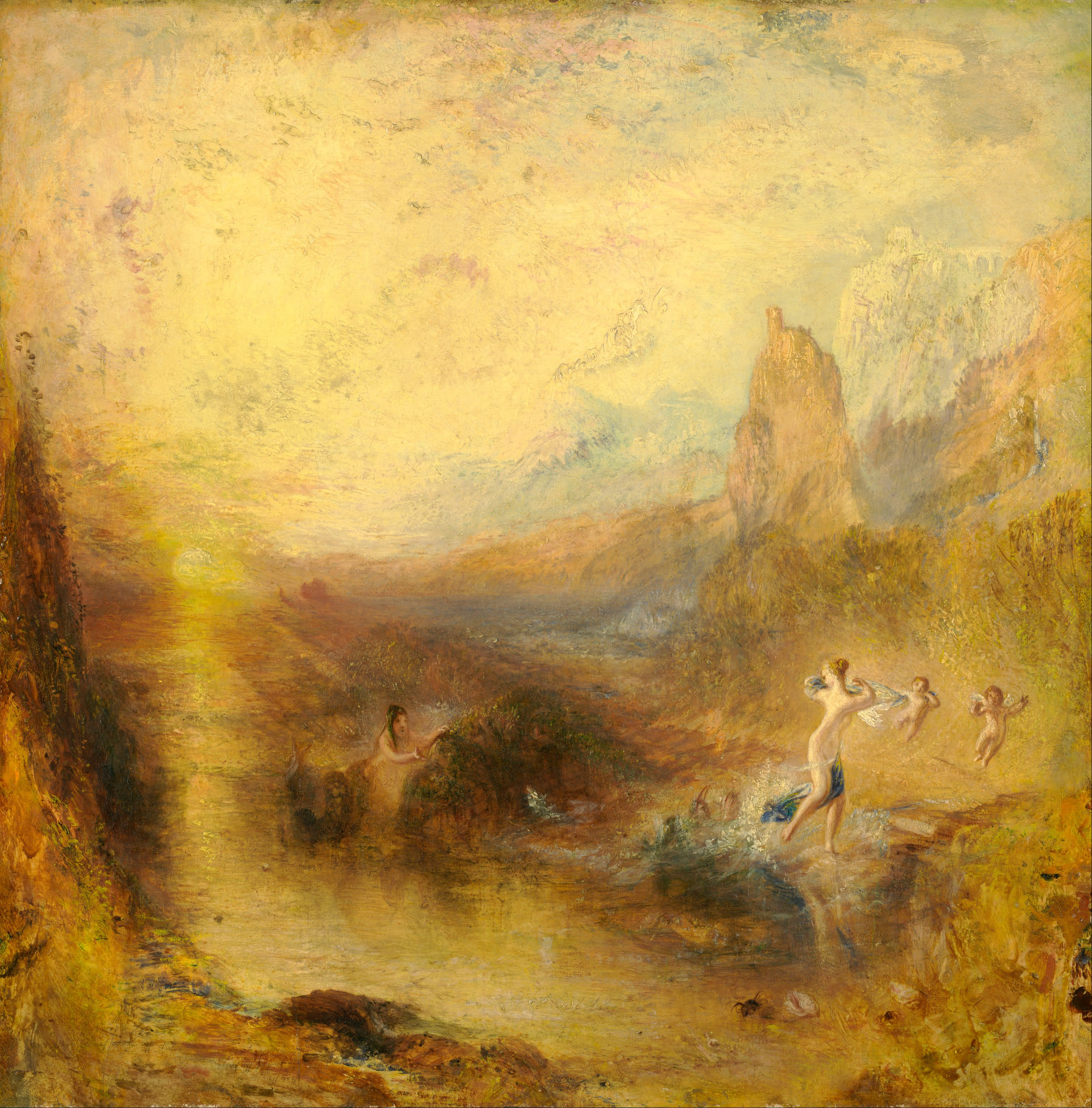
Glaucus and Scylla by J.M.W. Turner

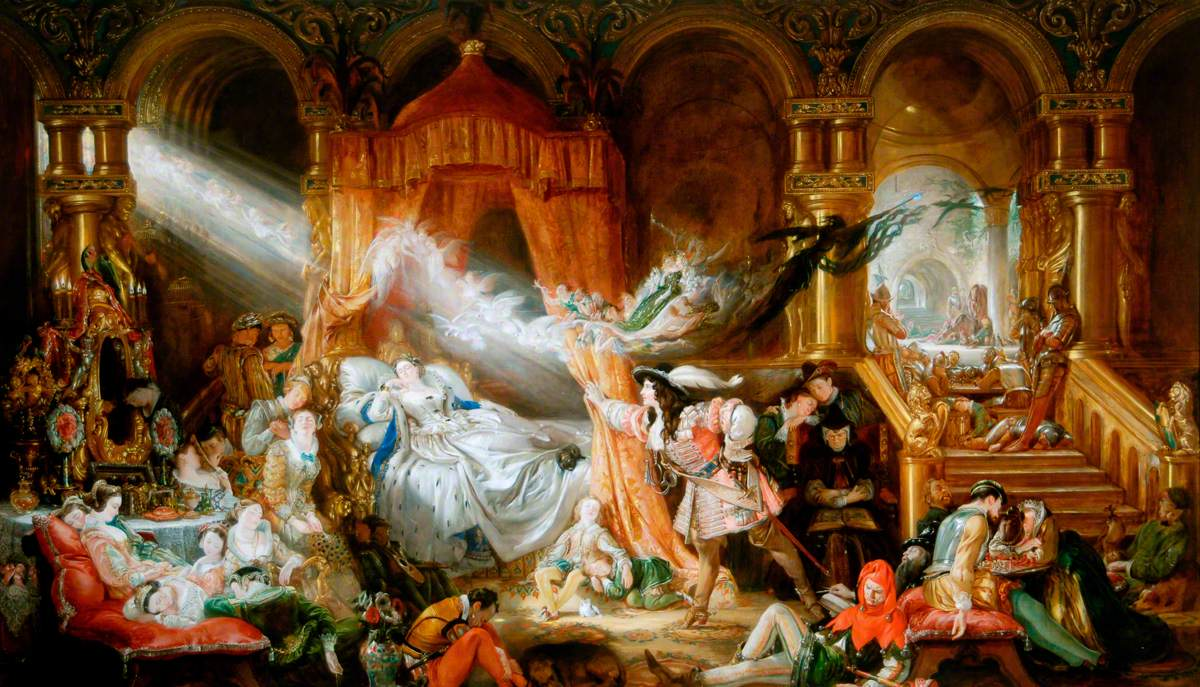
The Sleeping Beauty by Daniel Maclise

Hunt the Slipper by Daniel Maclise

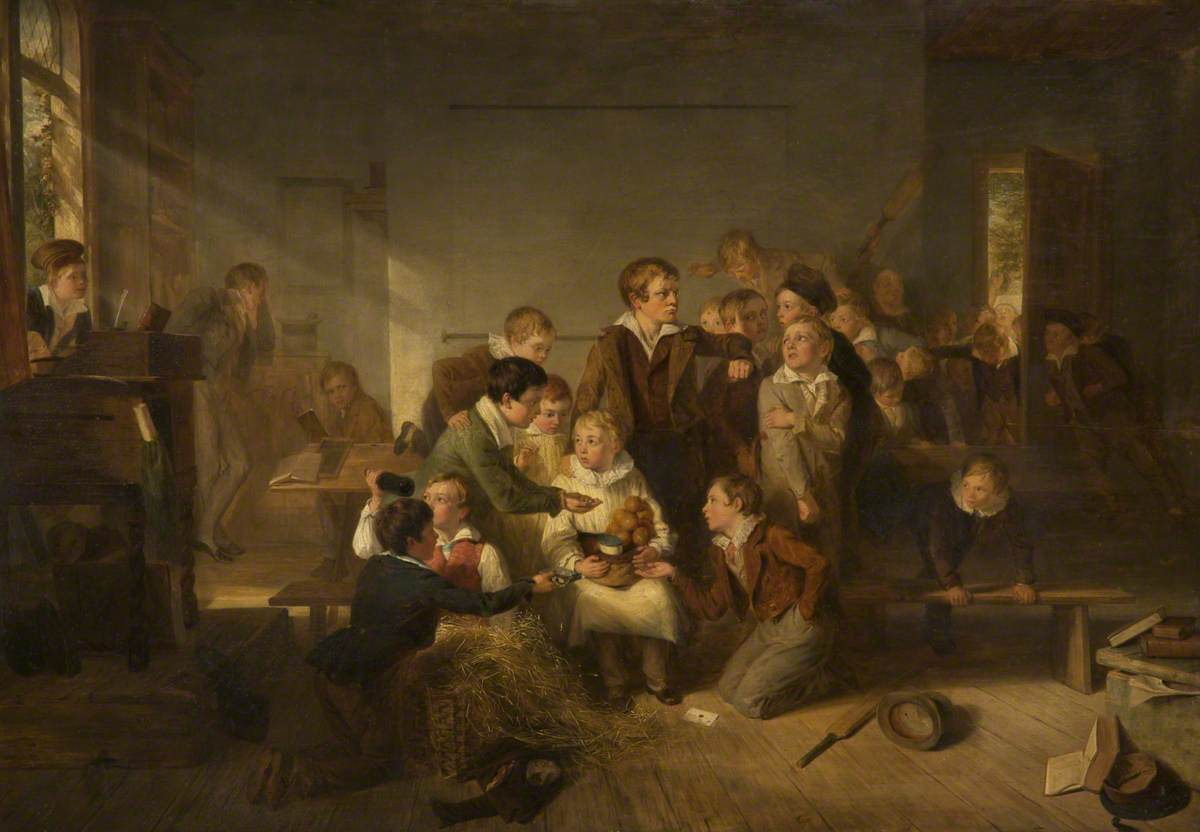
The Boy with Many Friends by Thomas Webster

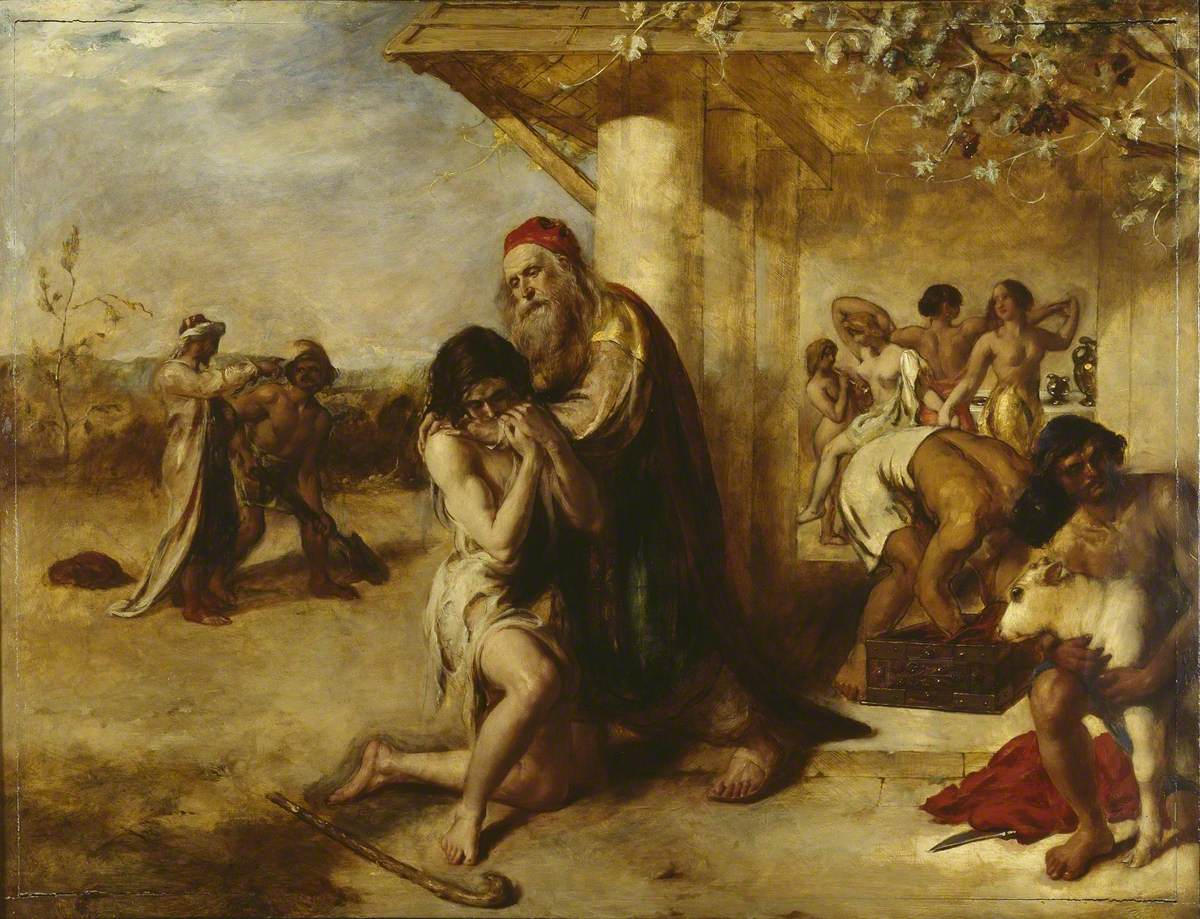
The Repentant Prodigal's Return to His Father by William Etty

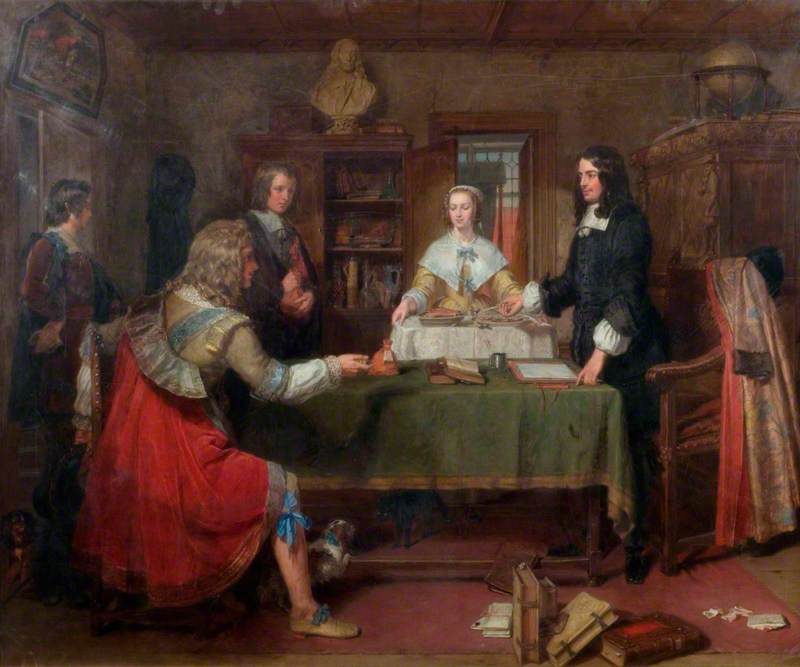
The Temptation of Andrew Marvell by Charles Landseer

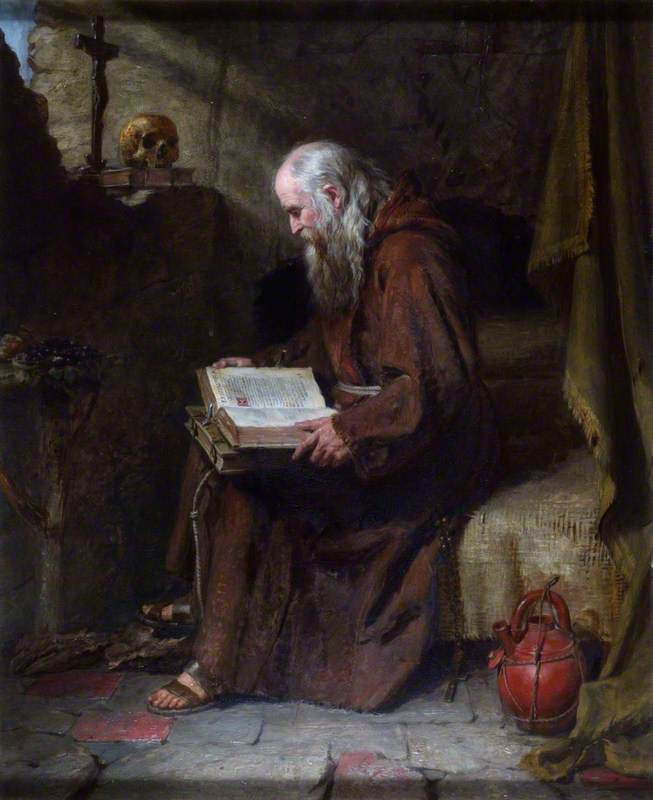
The Hermit by Charles Landseer

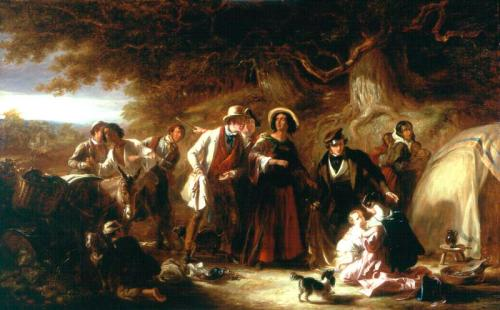
The Recovery of the Stolen Child by William Allan

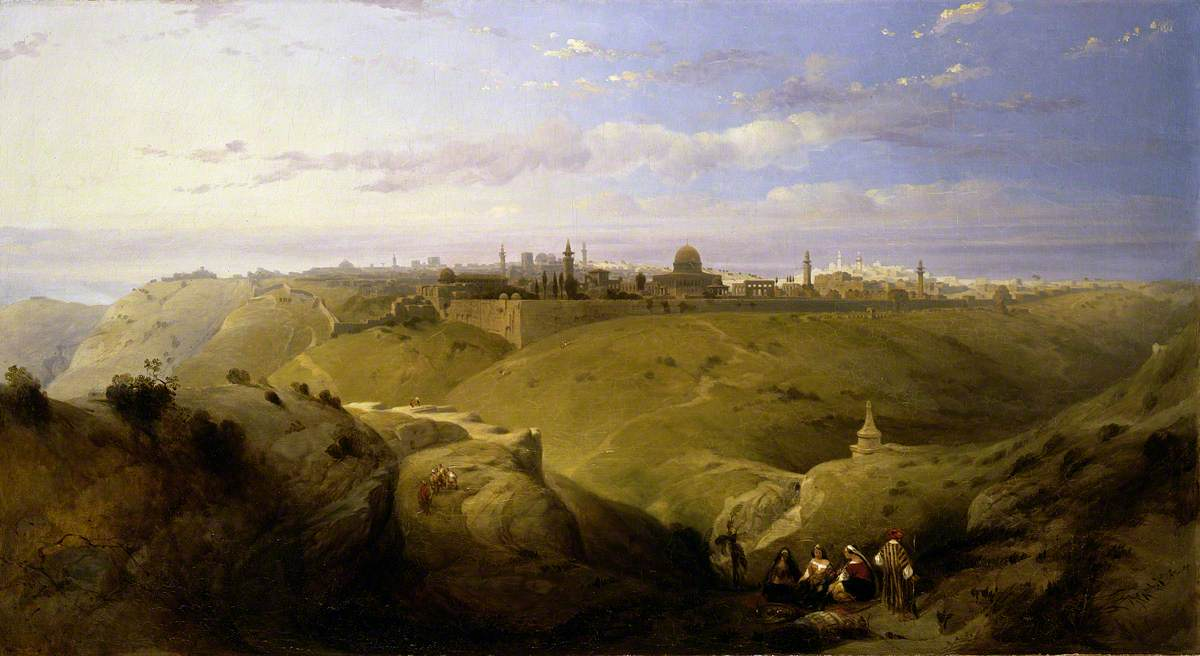
Pilgrims Approaching Jerusalem by David Roberts

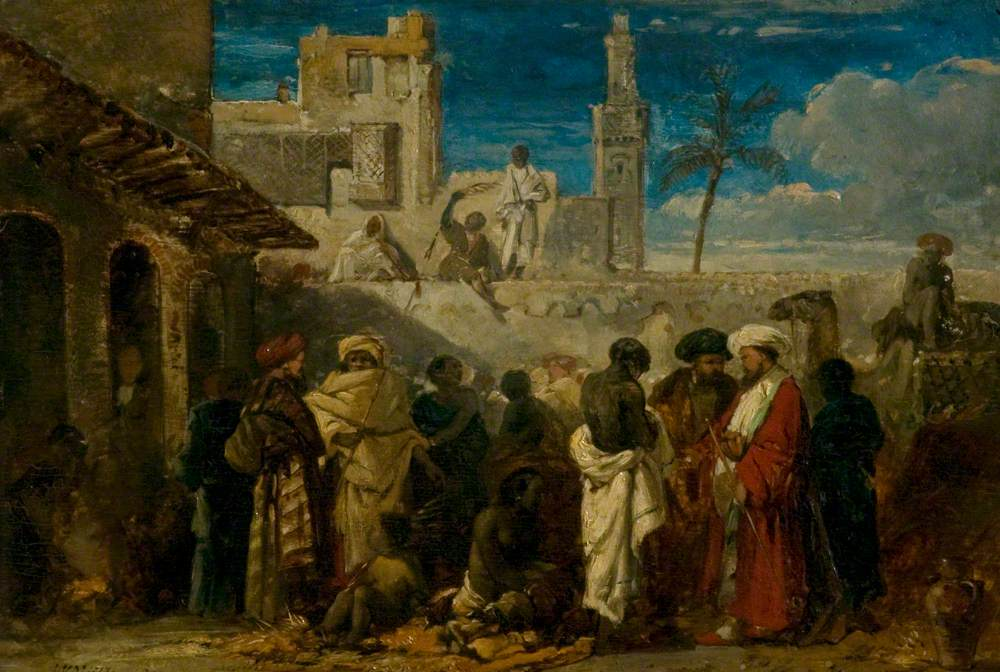
The Slave Market, Cairo by William James Müller

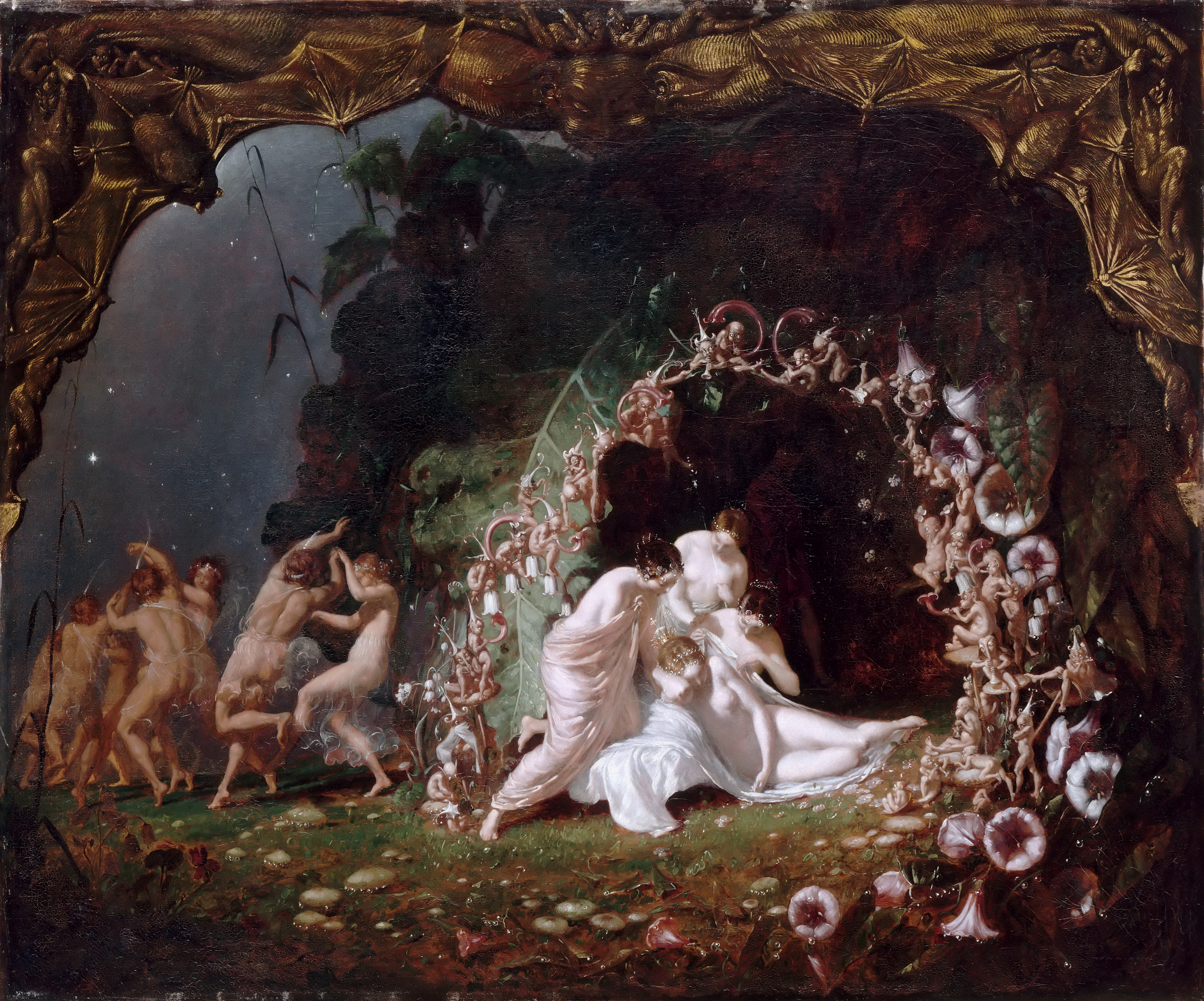
Titania Sleeping by Richard Dadd

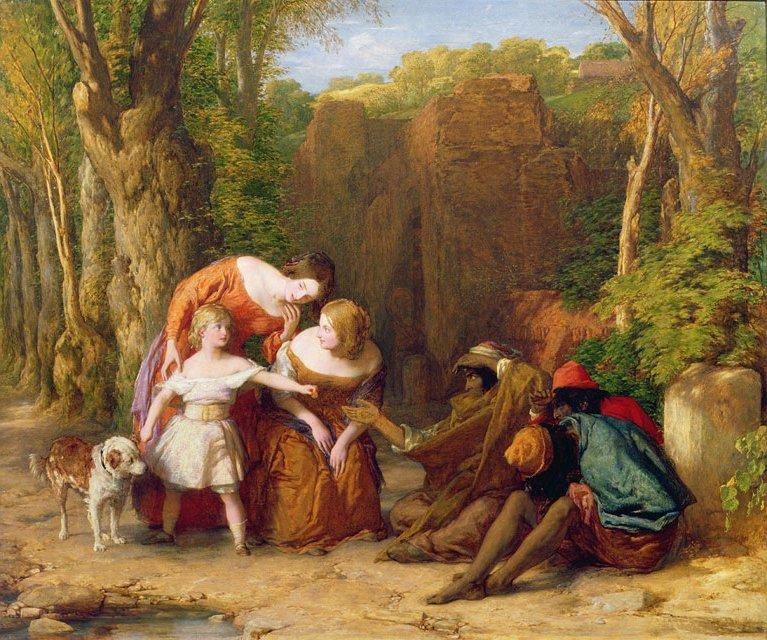
Train Up a Child by William Mulready

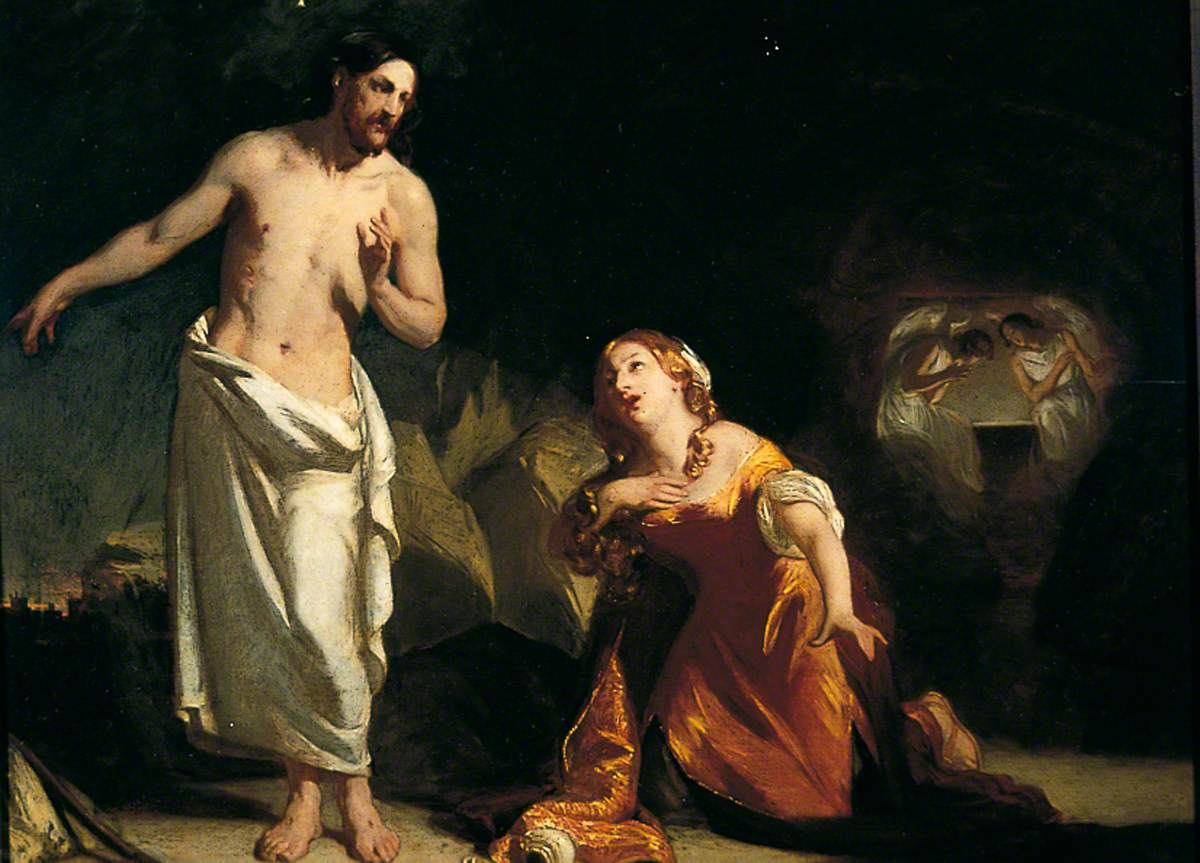
Christ Appearing to Mary Magdalene by John Prescott Knight

A Detachment of Cromwell's Cavalry Surprised in a Mountain Pass by Thomas Woodward

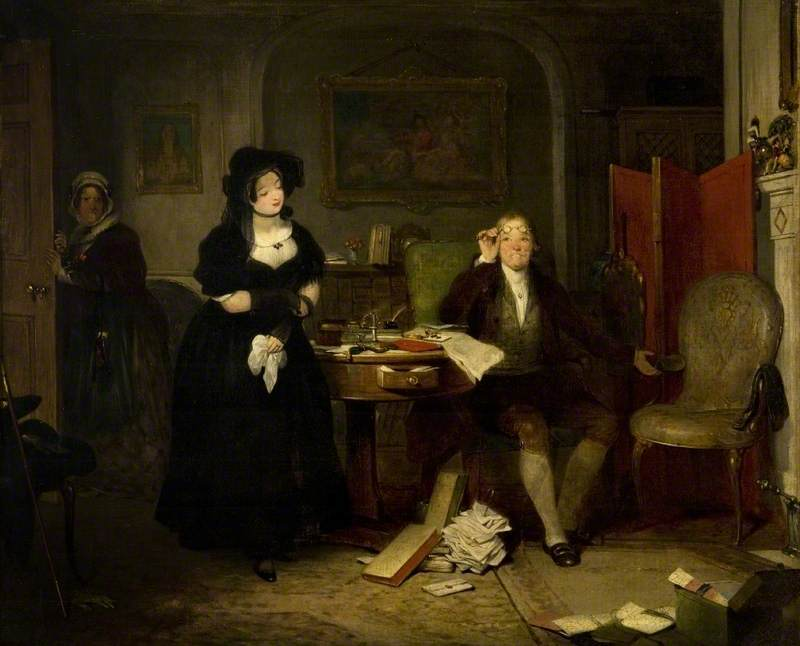
Answering the Advertisement by Francis Philip Stephanoff

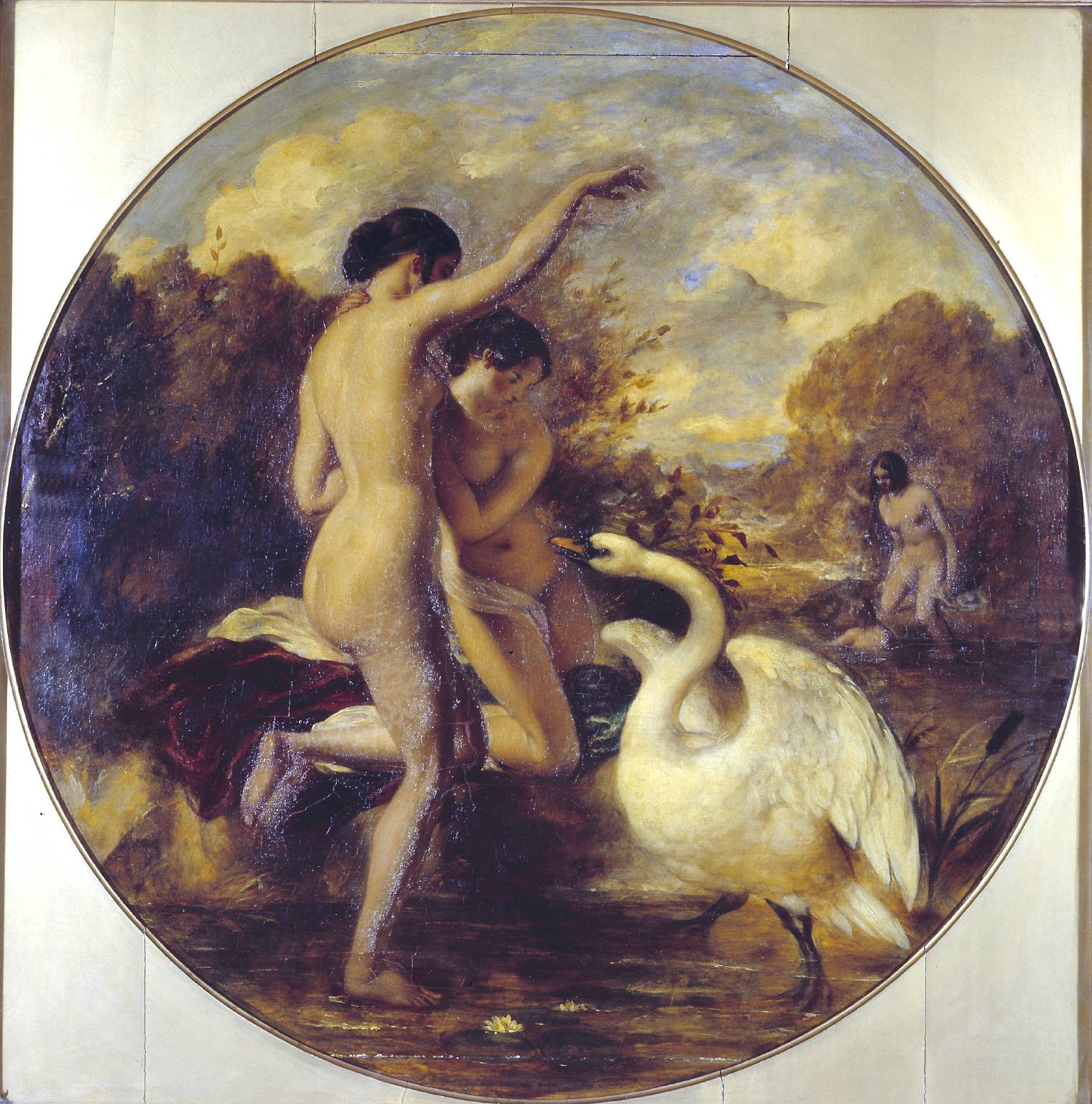
Female Bathers Surprised by a Swan by William Etty

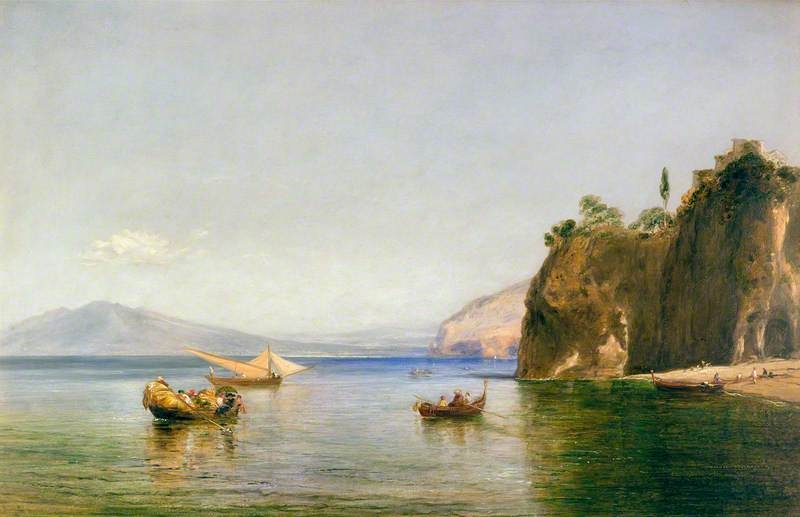
The Caves of Ulysses at Sorrento, Naples by William Collins

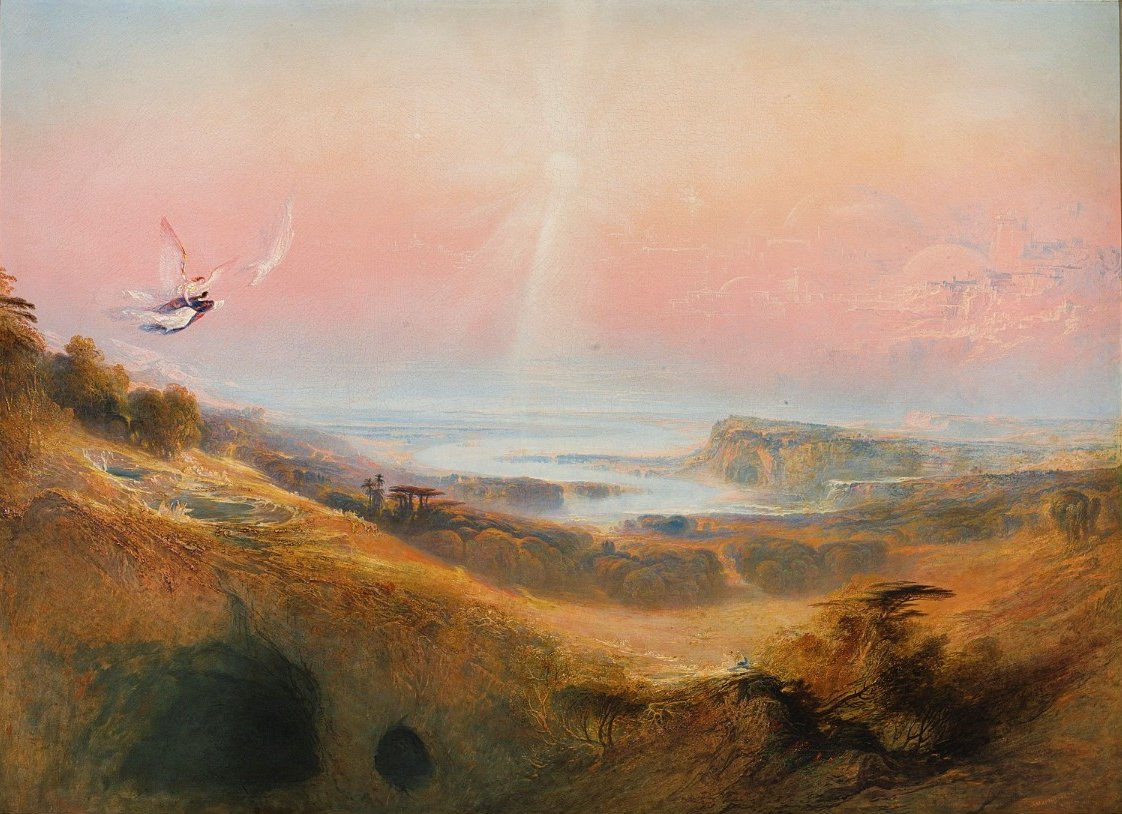
The Celestial City and the River of Bliss by John Martin

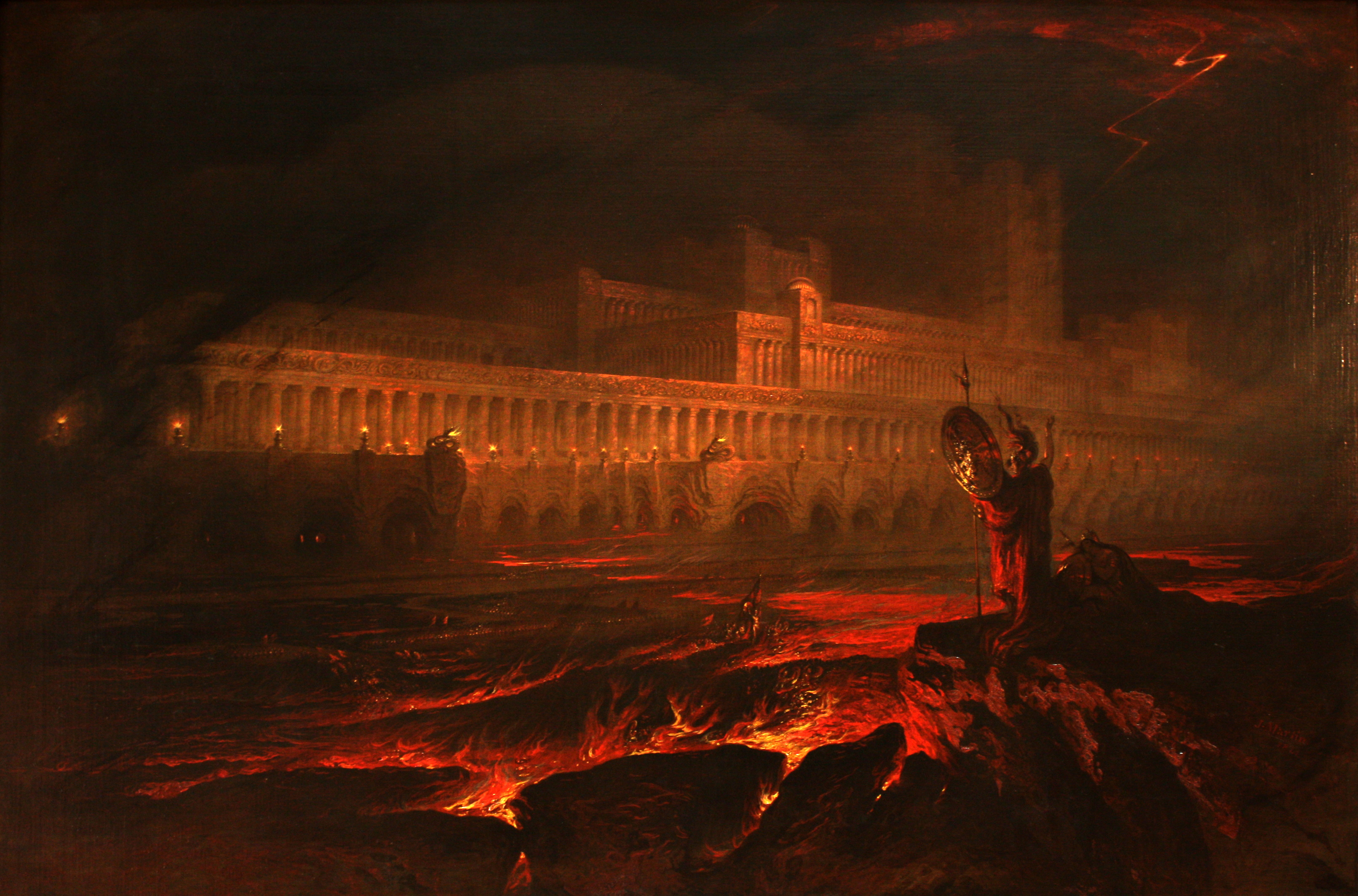
Pandemonium by John Martin

Lord Anson's Arrival At Spithead With His Prizes by John Christian Schetky

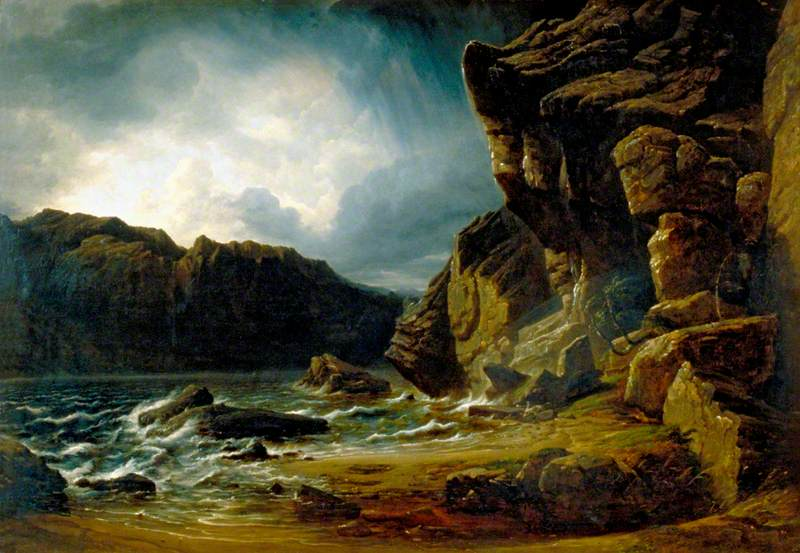
Liensfiord Lake, Norway by Francis Danby

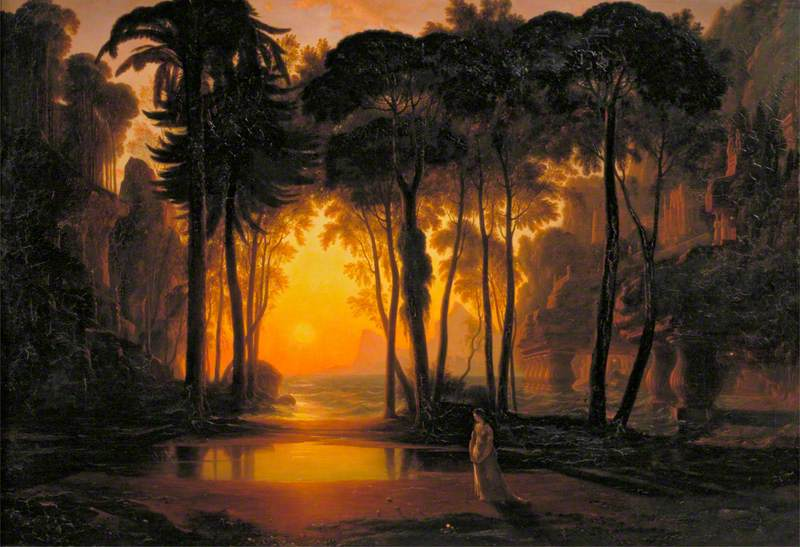
The Enchanted Castle by Francis Danby

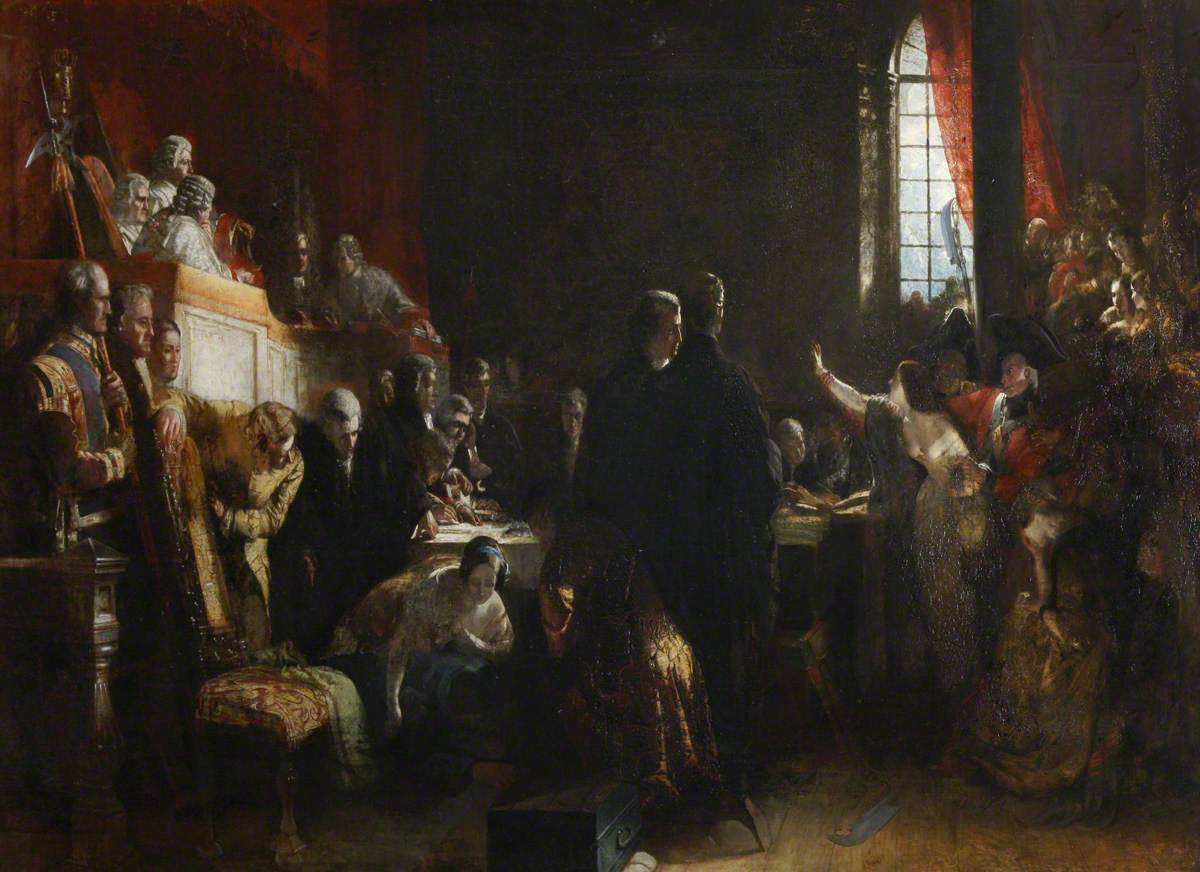
The Trial of Effie Deans by Robert Scott Lauder

Le Bourgeois Gentilhomme by Charles Robert Leslie

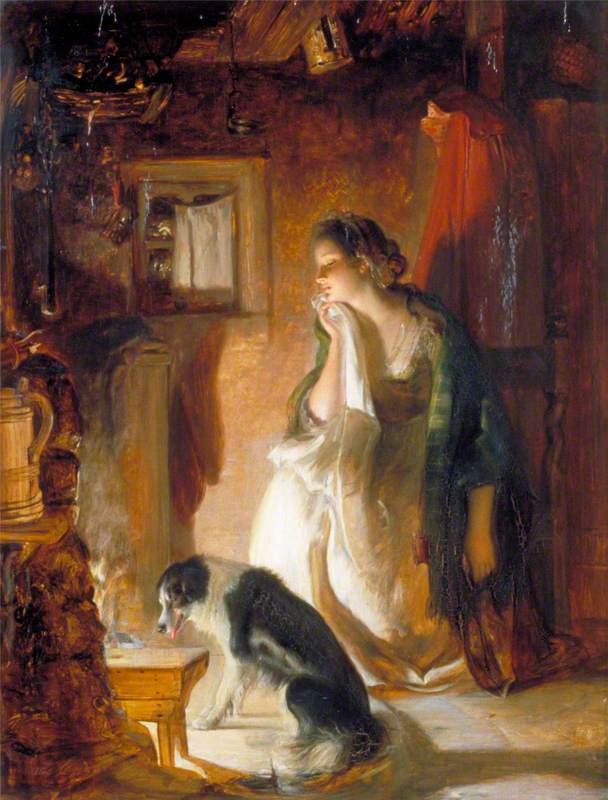
The Waefu' Heart by Thomas Duncan

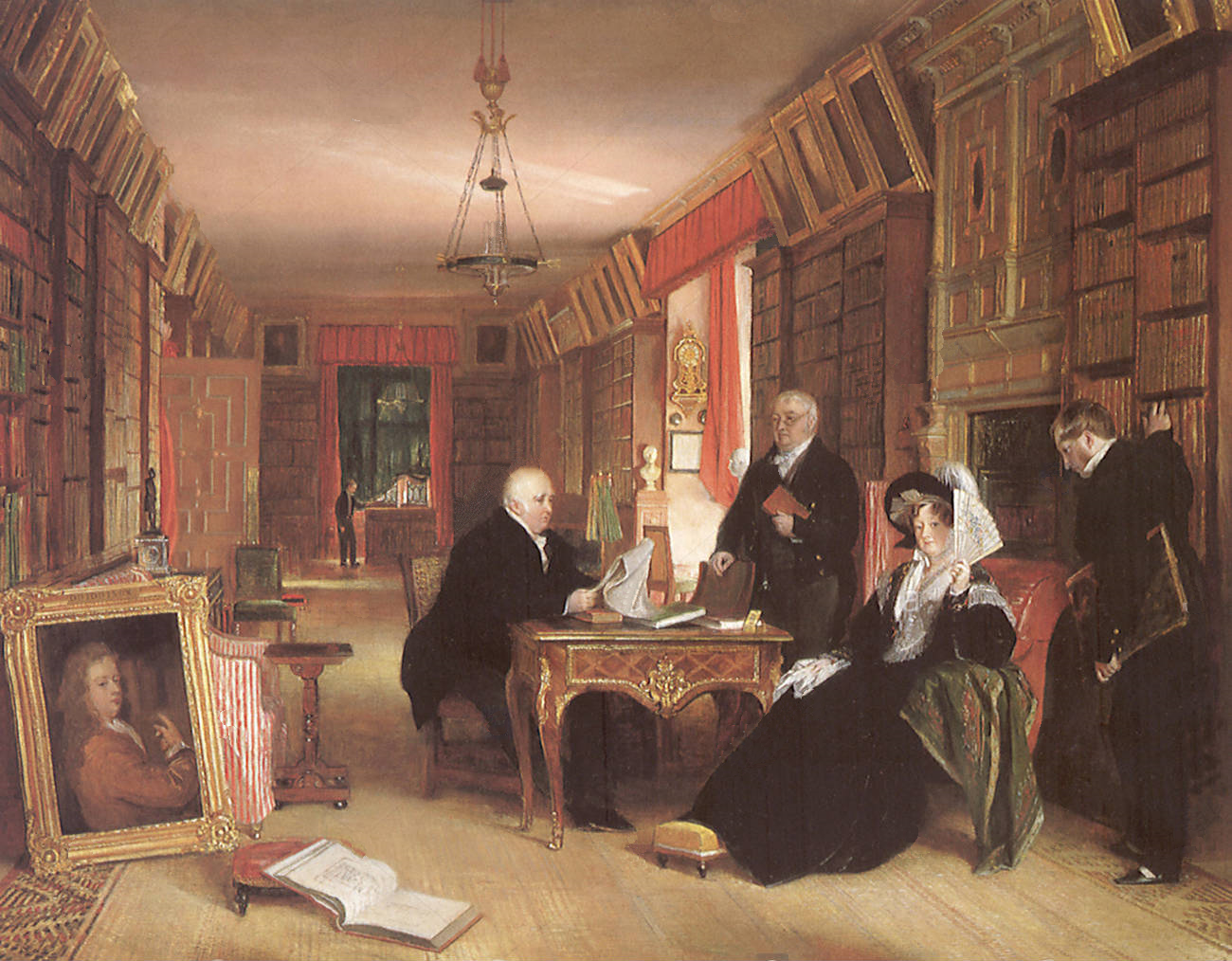
The Library at Holland House by Charles Robert Leslie

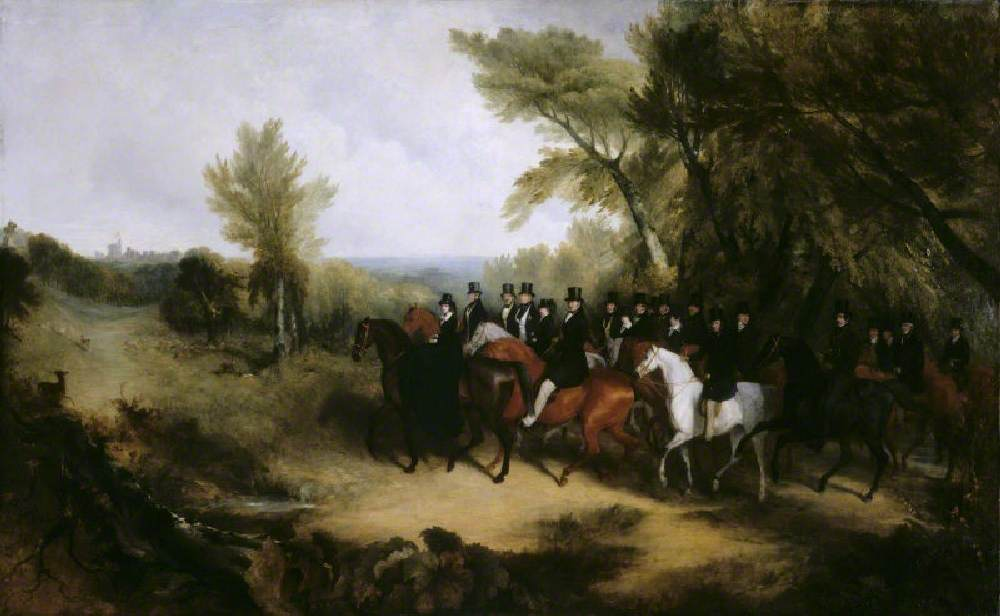
Queen Victoria, King Leopold and Their Suites Riding Out in Windsor Great Park by Richard Barrett Davis

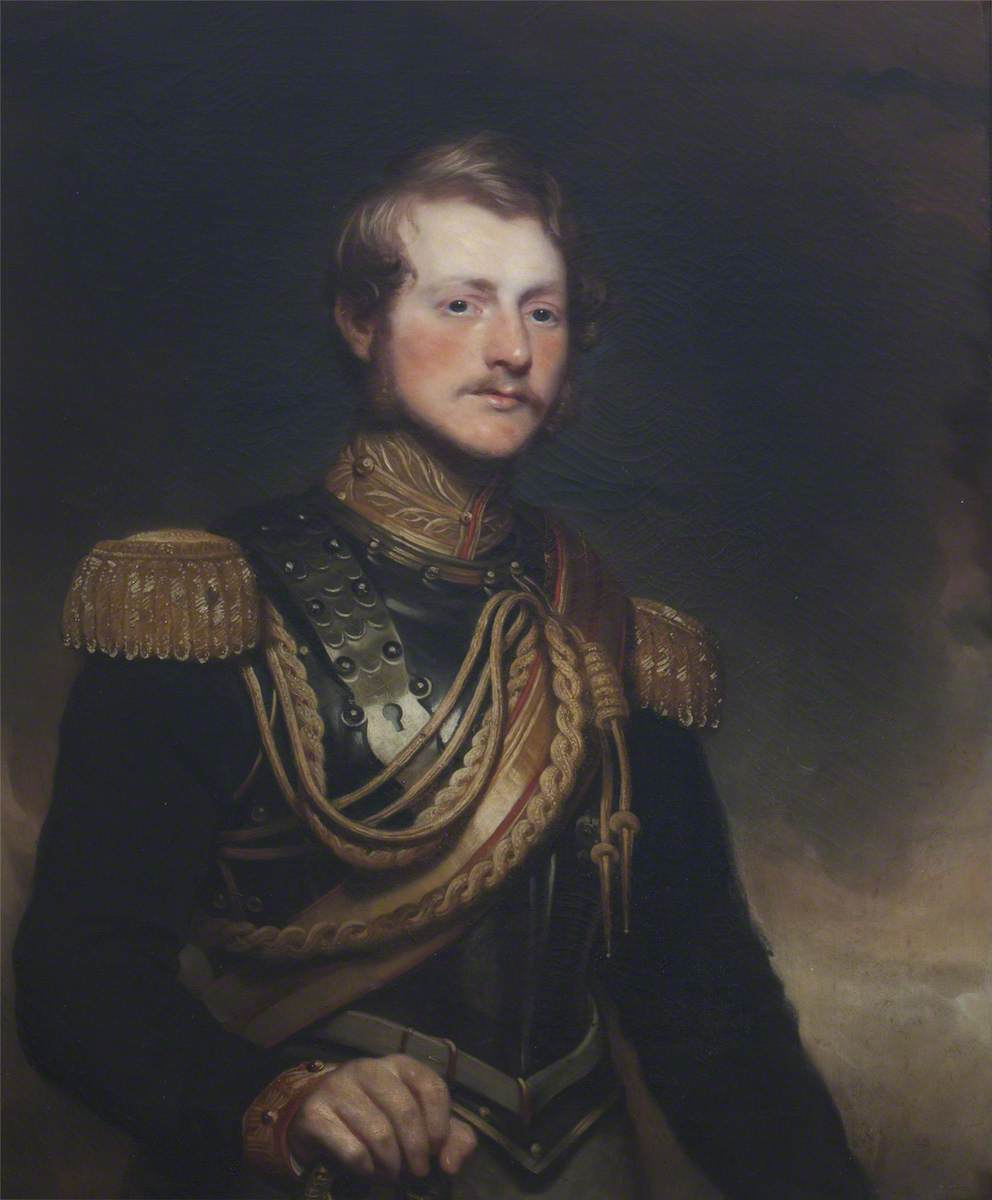
Portrait of Charles Cust by Martin Archer Shee

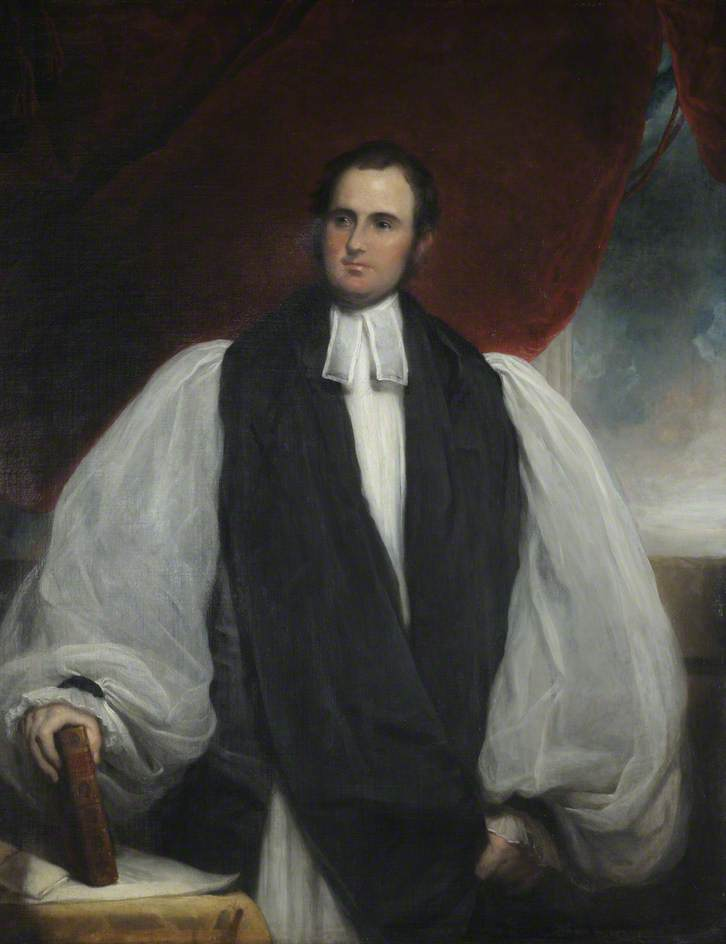
Portrait of James Bowstead by Martin Archer Shee

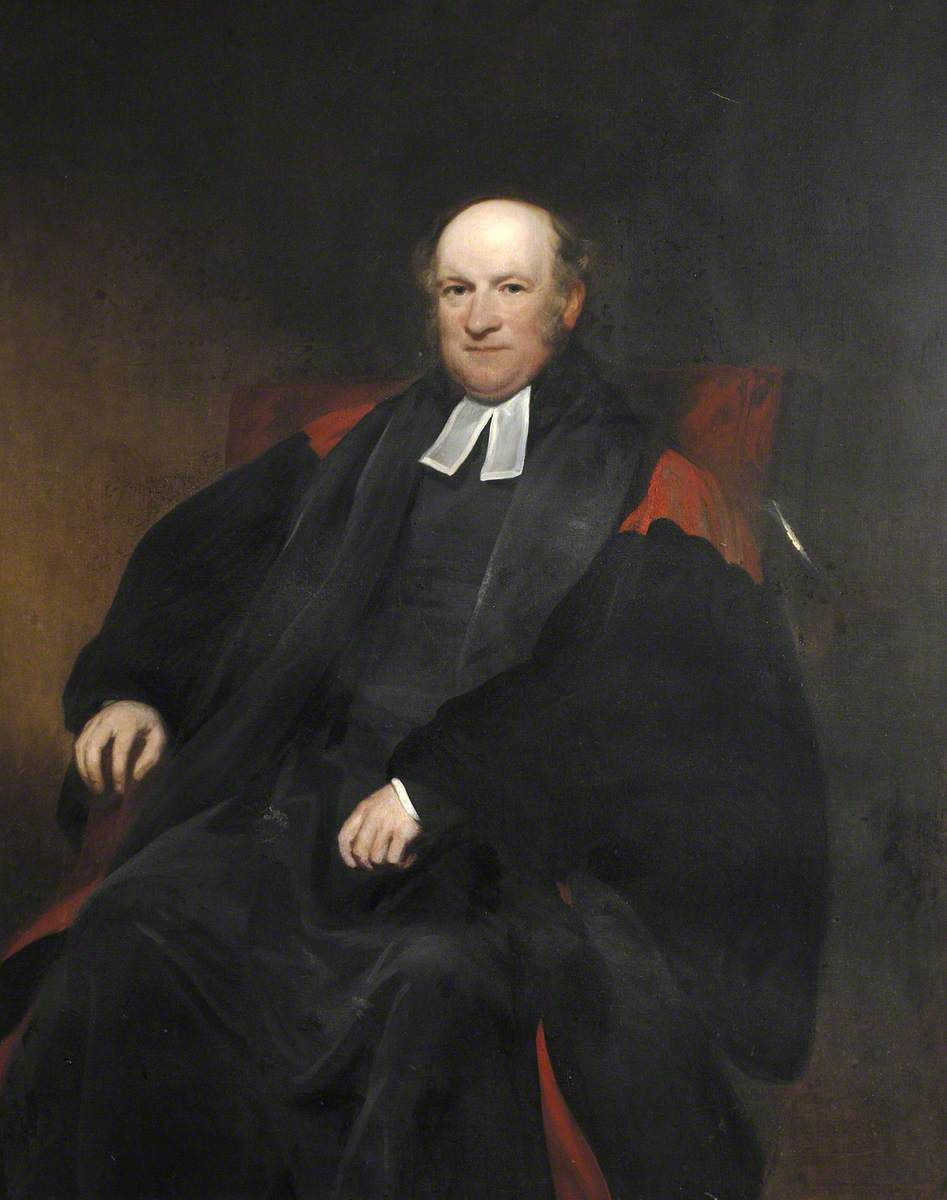
Portrait of Richard Jenkyns by Henry Perronet Briggs

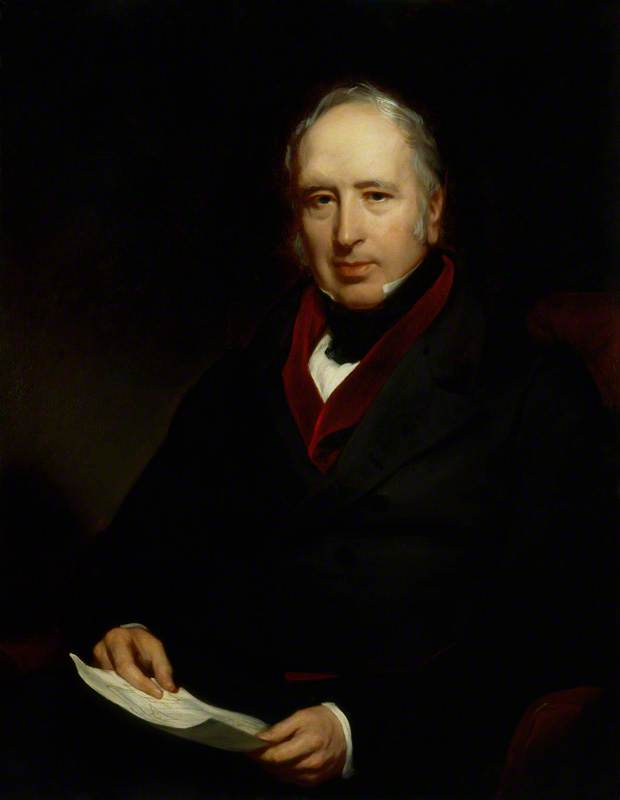
Portrait of George Cayley by Henry Perronet Briggs

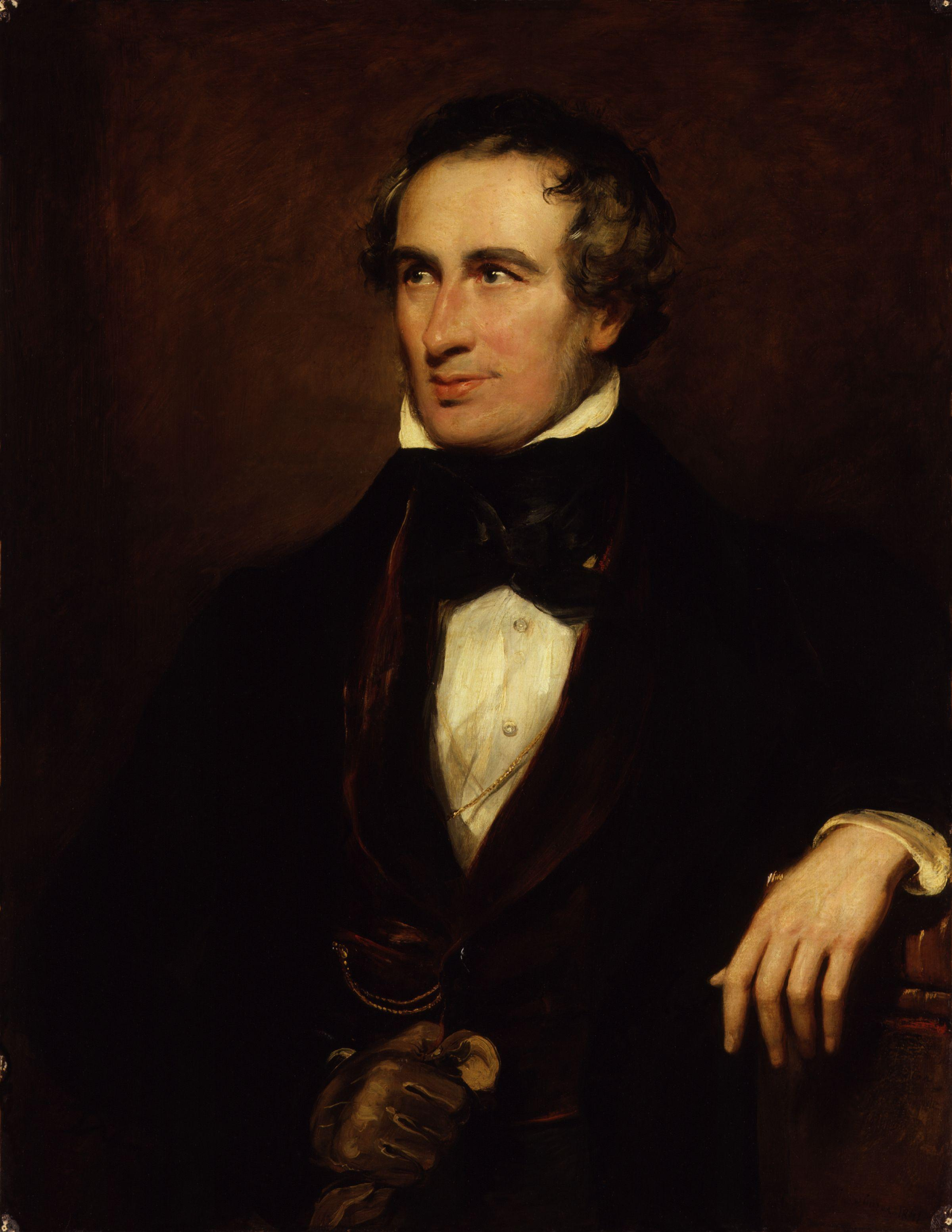
Portrait of John Burnet by William Simson

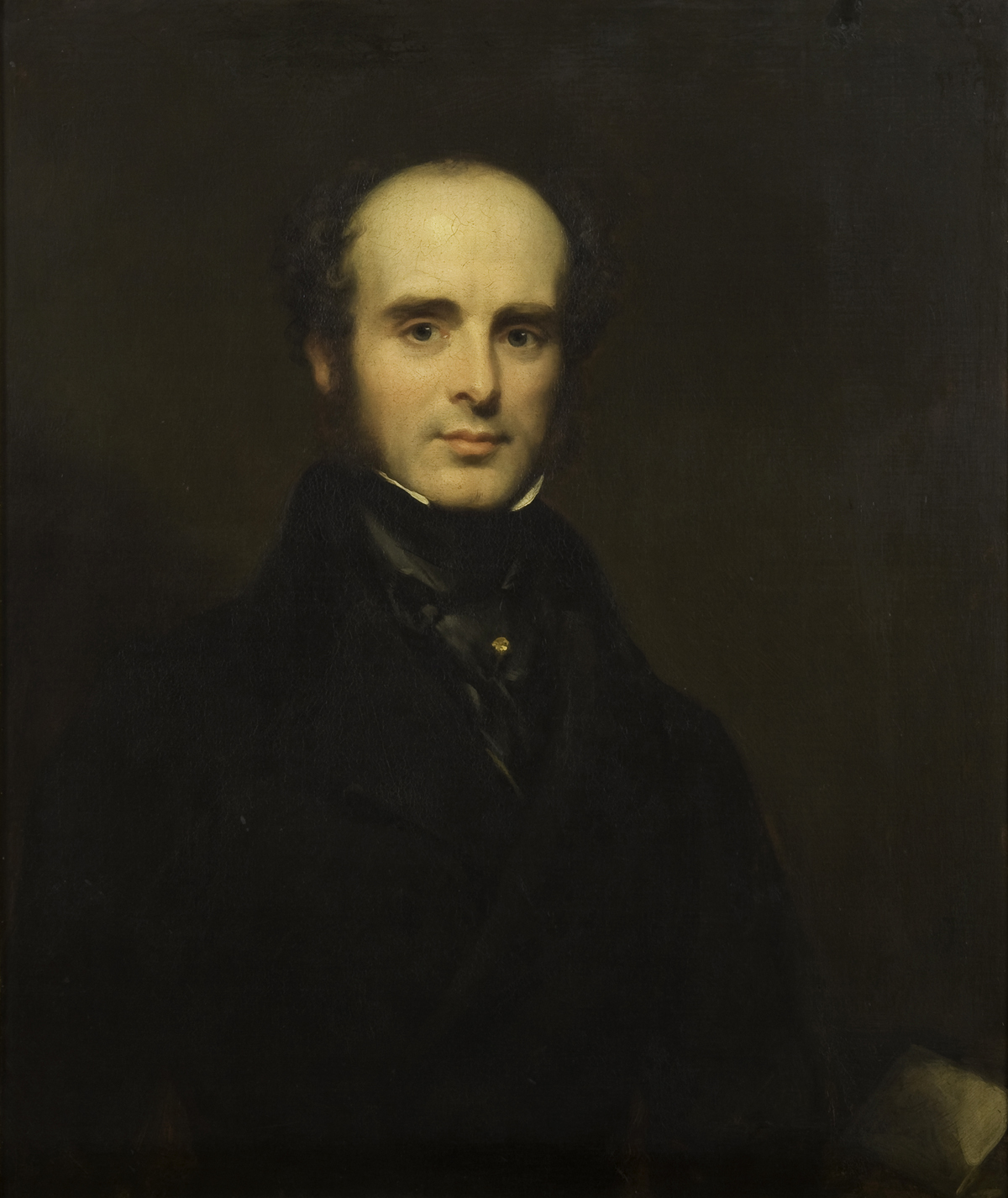
Portrait of James Hope by Thomas Phillips

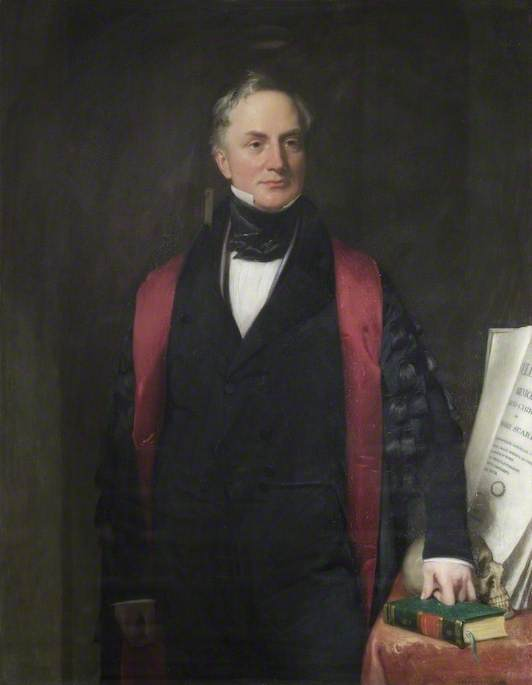
Portrait of William Lawrence by Henry William Pickersgill

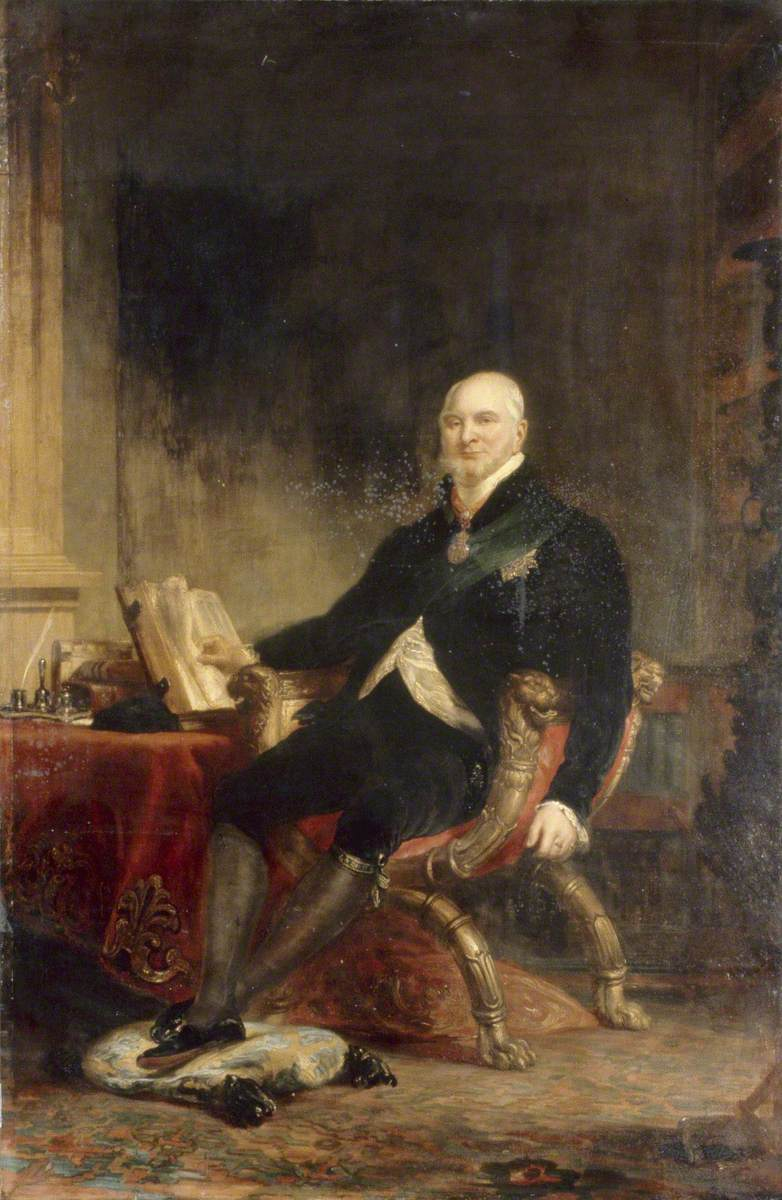
Portrait of the Duke of Sussex by Solomon Hart

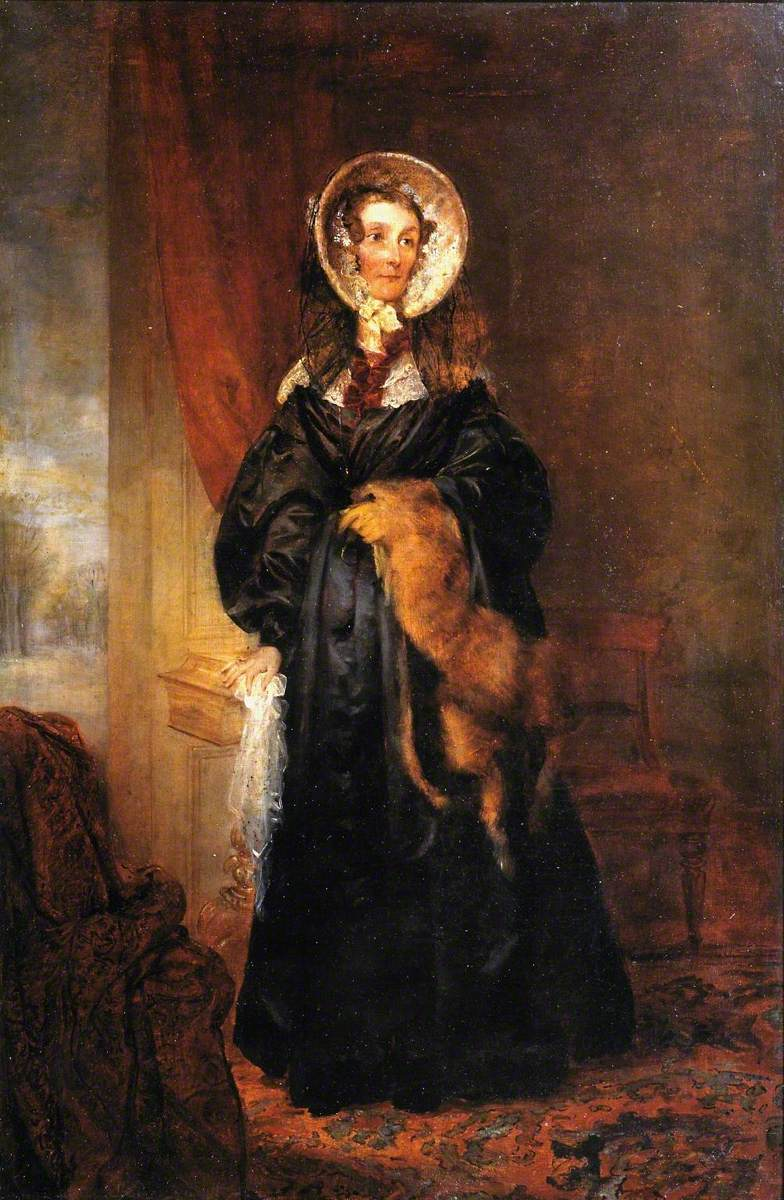
Portrait of Mary Brunton by George Frederic Watts

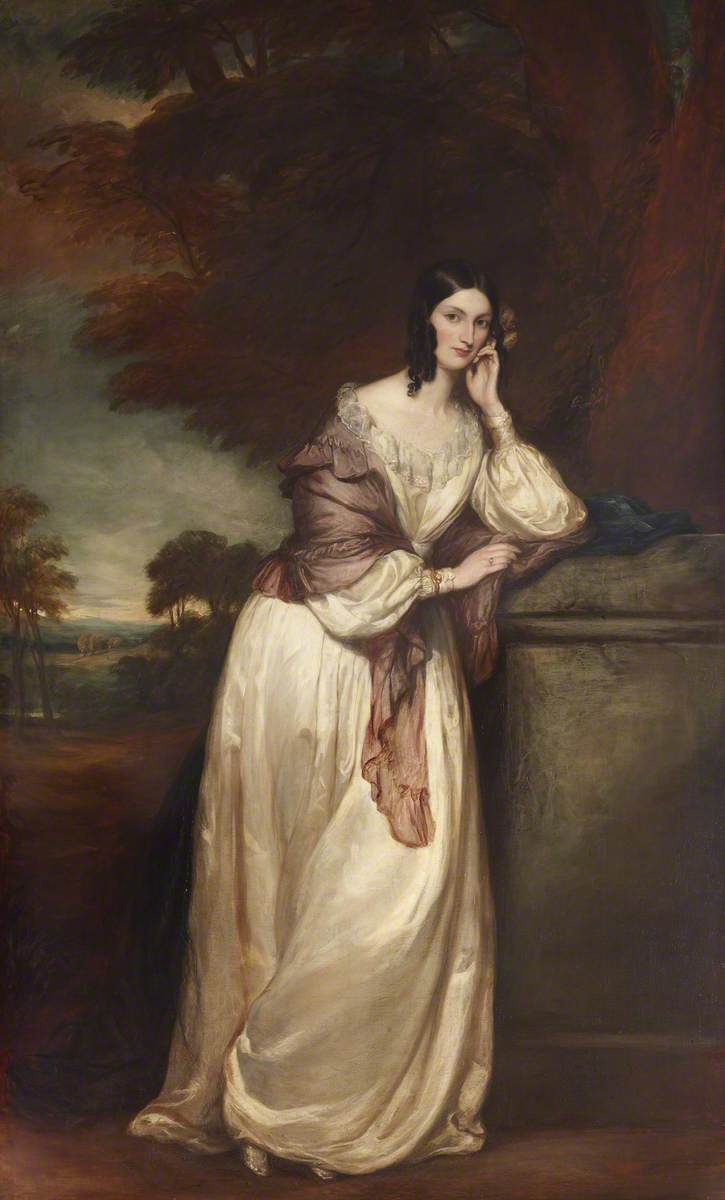
Portrait of Countess Jermyn by Francis Grant

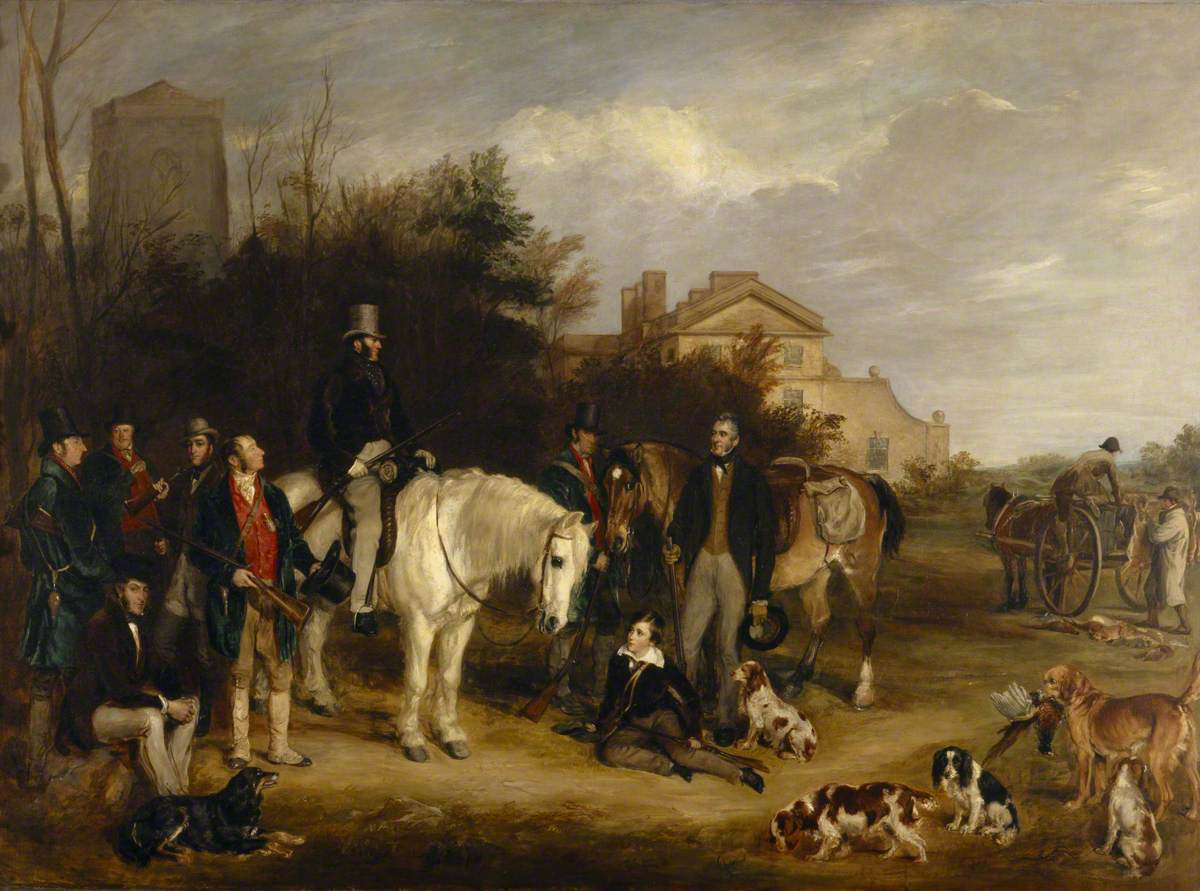
A Shooting Party at Ranton Abbey by Francis Grant

== See also ==
- Salon of 1841, a contemporary French exhibition held at the Louvre in Paris

== Bibliography ==
- Hamilton, James. Turner - A Life. Sceptre, 1998.
- Herrmann, Luke. J.M.W. Turner. Oxford University Press, 2007.
- Murray, Peter. Daniel Maclise, 1806-1870: Romancing the Past. Crawford Art Gallery, 2009.
- Tromans, Nicholas. David Wilkie: The People's Painter. Edinburgh University Press, 2007.
- Weston, Nancy. Daniel Maclise: Irish Artist in Victorian London. Four Courts Press, 2009.
