= Pilgrims Approaching Jerusalem =

Painting by David Roberts

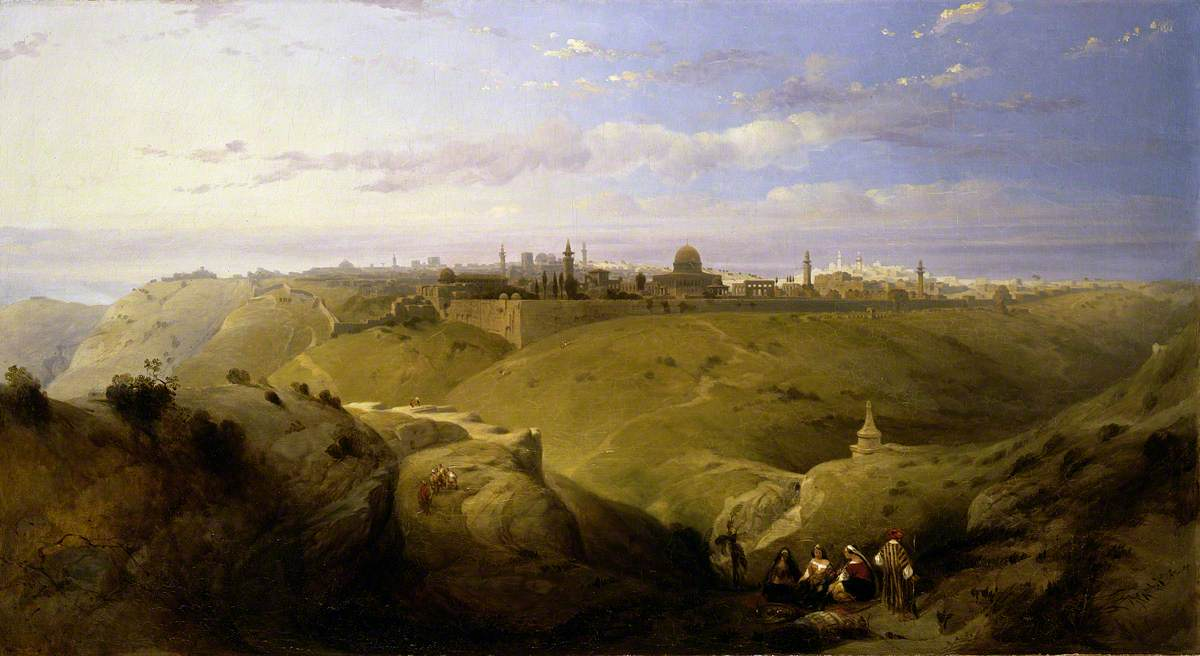
- Version in Norwich Castle
- Artist: David Roberts
- Year: 1841
- Type: Oil on canvas, landscape painting
- Dimensions: 119.3 cm × 210.7 cm (47.0 in × 83.0 in)
- Location: Royal Holloway, Surrey

Pilgrims Approaching Jerusalem is an 1841 landscape painting by the British artist David Roberts. Romantic in style, it presents a panoramic view of Jerusalem then under the control of the Ottoman Empire. The Old City of Jerusalem is shown from the Mount of Olives with groups of Christian pilgrims heading towards the city from the direction of the River Jordan some miles to the east. It is also known as Jerusalem from the Mount of Olives.

Roberts made a major visit to the Holy Land and wider Middle East from 1838 to 1838 and it was the source of inspiration for many of his subsequent paintings, capitalising on the growing interest in Orientalism in Victorian Britain. The painting was displayed at the Royal Academy Exhibition of 1841 held at the National Gallery in London It was later acquired by the art collector Thomas Holloway, who donated it to Royal Holloway in 1883. The image was a popular one and Roberts reproduced it several times, including a version from 1842 now in the collection of Norwich Castle. A mezzotint based on the painting was begun by the engraver David Lucas but was never published.

== Bibliography ==
- Chapel, Jeannie. Victorian Taste: The Complete Catalogue of Paintings at the Royal Holloway College. A. Zwemmer, 1982
- Guiterman, Helen. David Roberts, 1796-1864, Artist, Adventurer. Scottish Arts Council, 1981.
- Harpur, James. The Marshall Travel Atlas of Sacred Places: A Guide to the World's Spiritual Oases. Marshall, 1998.
- Sim, Katherine. David Roberts R.A., 1796–1864: A Biography. Quartet Books, 1984.
