= The Ducal Palace, Dogana and Part of San Giorgio =

Painting by J. M. W. Turner

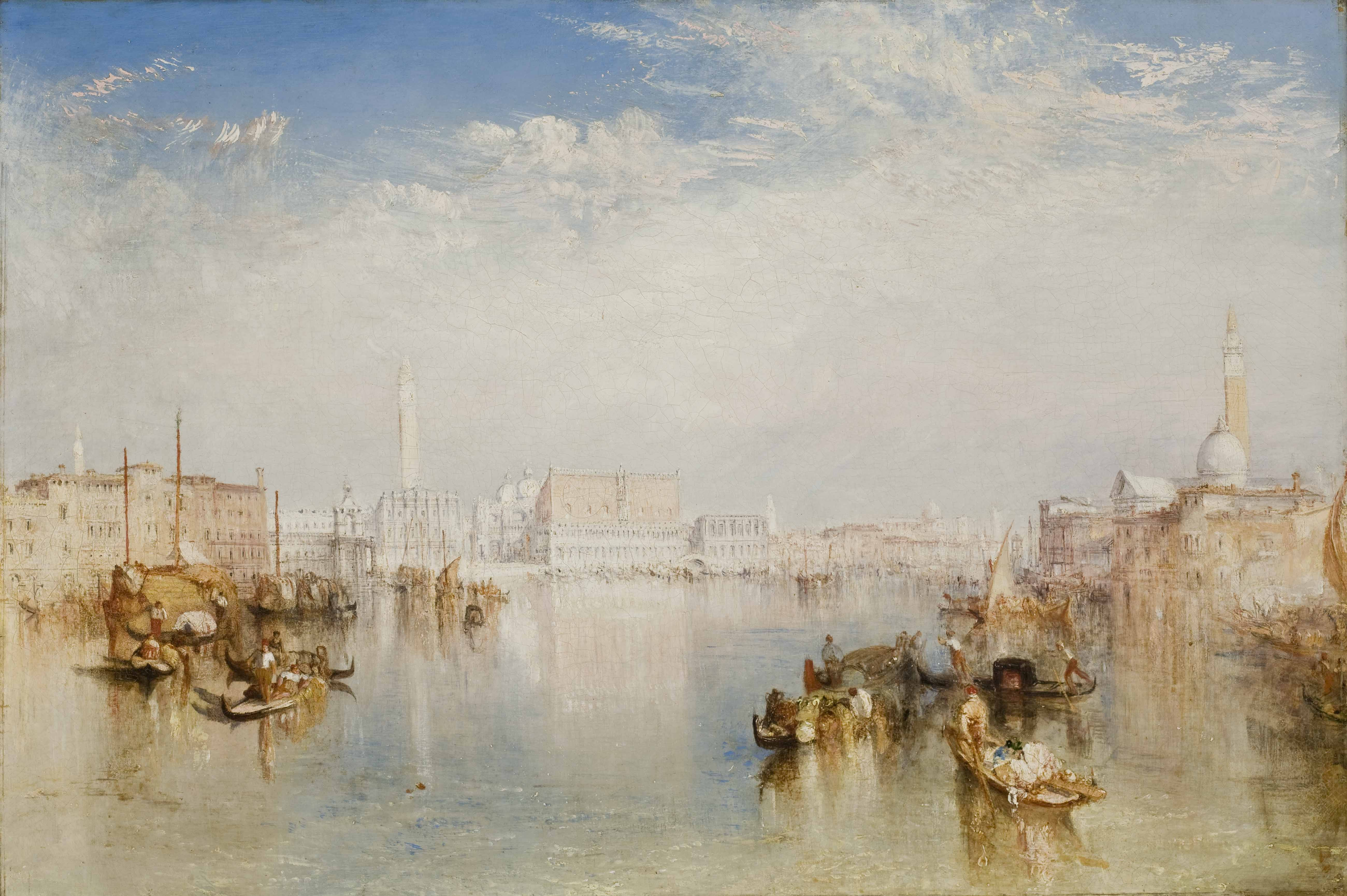
- Artist: J. M. W. Turner
- Year: 1841
- Type: Oil on canvas, landscape painting
- Dimensions: 63.5 cm × 93 cm (25.0 in × 37 in)
- Location: Allen Memorial Art Museum, Ohio

The Ducal Palace, Dogana and Part of San Giorgio is an 1841 landscape painting by the British artist J.M.W. Turner. It presents a view of Venice, seen from the Giudecca Canal, featuring notable landmarks such as the Doge's Palace, the Campinale of Piazza San Marco and San Giorgio Maggiore. The scene is depicted in luminous sunlight, emphasising the Romanticism of the scene.

Turner visited Venice, then part of the Austrian Empire, on several occasions and exhibited a variety of depictions of the city during this period. The work was commissioned by Turner's friend and fellow member of the Royal Academy, the sculptor Francis Leggatt Chantrey. It was displayed at the Royal Academy Exhibition of 1841 at the National Gallery in London, one of three scenes of Venice Turner exhibited that year. It is today in the collection of the Allen Memorial Art Museum in Oberlin, Ohio having been acquired through a 1944 bequest.

== See also ==
- List of paintings by J. M. W. Turner

== Bibliography ==
- Bailey, Anthony. J.M.W. Turner: Standing in the Sun. Tate Enterprises Ltd, 2013.
- Costello, Leo. J.M.W. Turner and the Subject of History. Routledge, 2017.
- Herrmann, Luke. J.M.W. Turner. Oxford University Press, 2007.
- Warrell, Ian. Venice with Turner. Tate Publishing, 2020.
