= The Temple of Dendera =

Painting by David Roberts

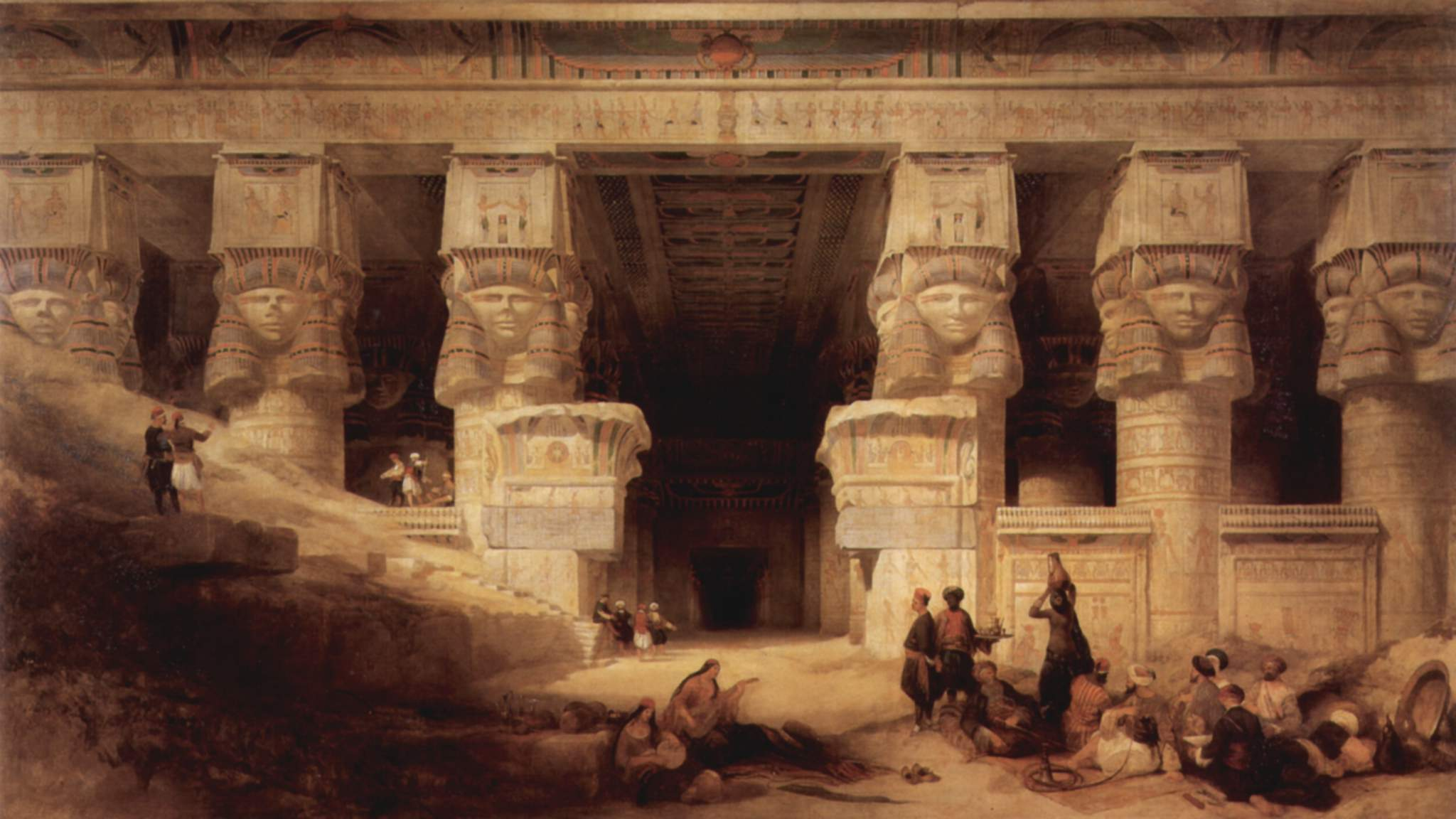
- Artist: David Roberts
- Year: 1841
- Type: Oil on canvas, landscape painting
- Dimensions: 119 cm × 212 cm (47 in × 83 in)
- Location: City Museum and Art Gallery, Bristol

The Temple of Dendera is an 1841 landscape painting by the Scottish artist David Roberts. It portrays the entrance to the Dendera Temple in Egypt. Roberts, a member of the British Royal Academy travelled to the Holy Land at a time when Orientalism was at its height. During this period Egypt still remained formally part of the Ottoman Empire. A group of Ottoman officials are shown on the right of the canvas being served by slaves, including a half-naked woman carrying a water jug.

The work appeared at the Royal Academy Exhibition of 1841 at the National Gallery in London. Today the painting is in the collection of the Bristol City Museum and Art Gallery, having been acquired in 1919.

== Bibliography ==
- Sim, Katherine. David Roberts R.A., 1796-1864: A Biography. Quartet Books, 1984.
- Wright, Christopher, Gordon, Catherine May & Smith, Mary Peskett. British and Irish Paintings in Public Collections: An Index of British and Irish Oil Paintings by Artists Born Before 1870 in Public and Institutional Collections in the United Kingdom and Ireland. Yale University Press, 2006.
