= The Boy with Many Friends =

Painting by Thomas Webster

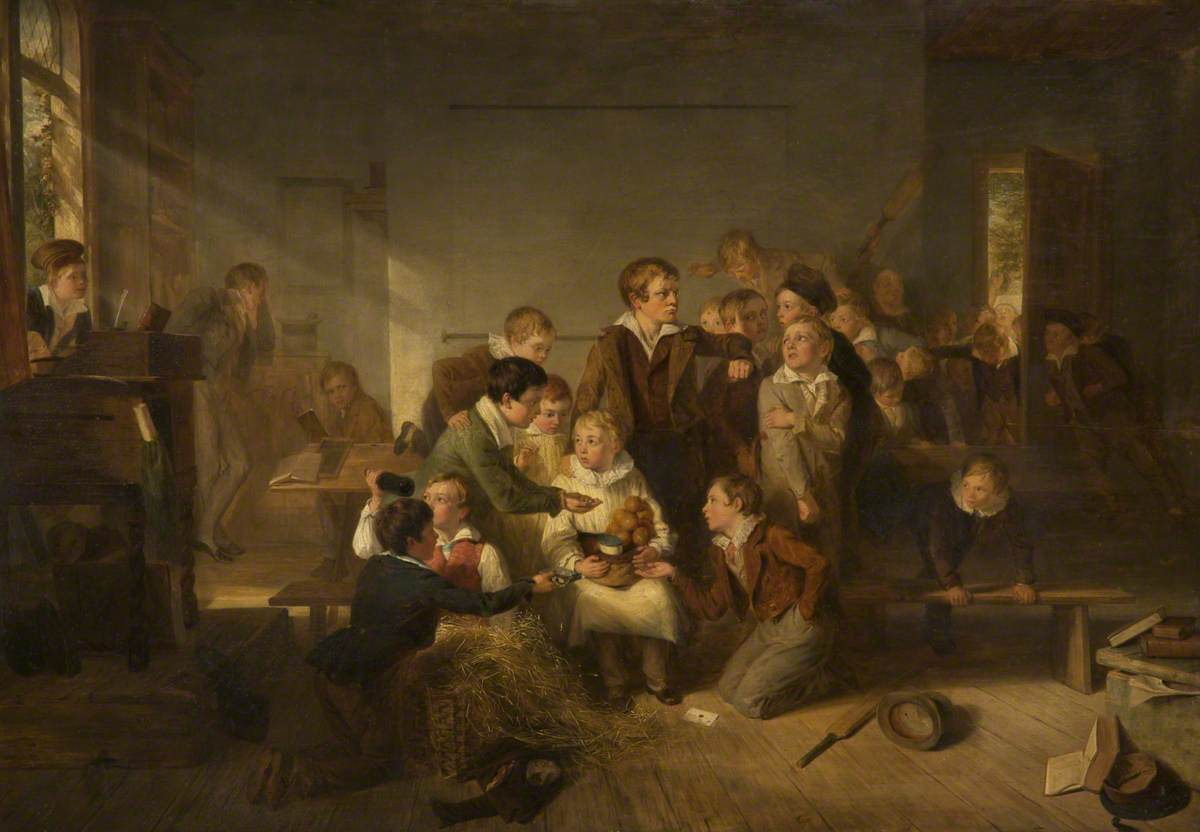
- Artist: Thomas Webster
- Year: 1841
- Type: Oil on canvas, genre painting
- Dimensions: 62 cm × 905 cm (24 in × 356 in)
- Location: Bury Art Museum, Greater ManchesterThe Boy with Many Friends Thomas George Webster (1800–1886) Bury Art Museum

The Boy with Many Friends is an 1841 oil painting by the British artist Thomas Webster. It featured a view of a schoolhouse in rural England. A schoolboy who has come to school with a large lunch finds himself pleadingly approached by the other boys who now wish to be his friends.

Webster was celebrated for his scenes of everyday life of the early Victorian era. He was later one of the key figures in the Cranbrook Colony of artists in Kent who produced popular works in this tradition. The painting was displayed at the Royal Academy Exhibition of 1841 held at the National Gallery in London. Later acquired by the art collector Thomas Wrigley whose family presented it to the Bury Art Museum as part of a major gift to mark the Diamond Jubilee of Queen Victoria in 1897.

== Bibliography ==
- Simon, Caroline & Bourne, Susan. The Age of Innocence? Children in Art 1830-1930. Museum Services of Blackburn, Burnley and Lancashire County, 1989.
- Thompson, Carol (ed.) The Cranbrook Colony: Fresh Perspectives. Wolverhampton Art Gallery, 2010.
- Williams, Chris (ed.) A Companion to Nineteenth-Century Britain. Wiley, 2006.
