= Benjamin Hick =

English civil and mechanical engineer (1790-1842)

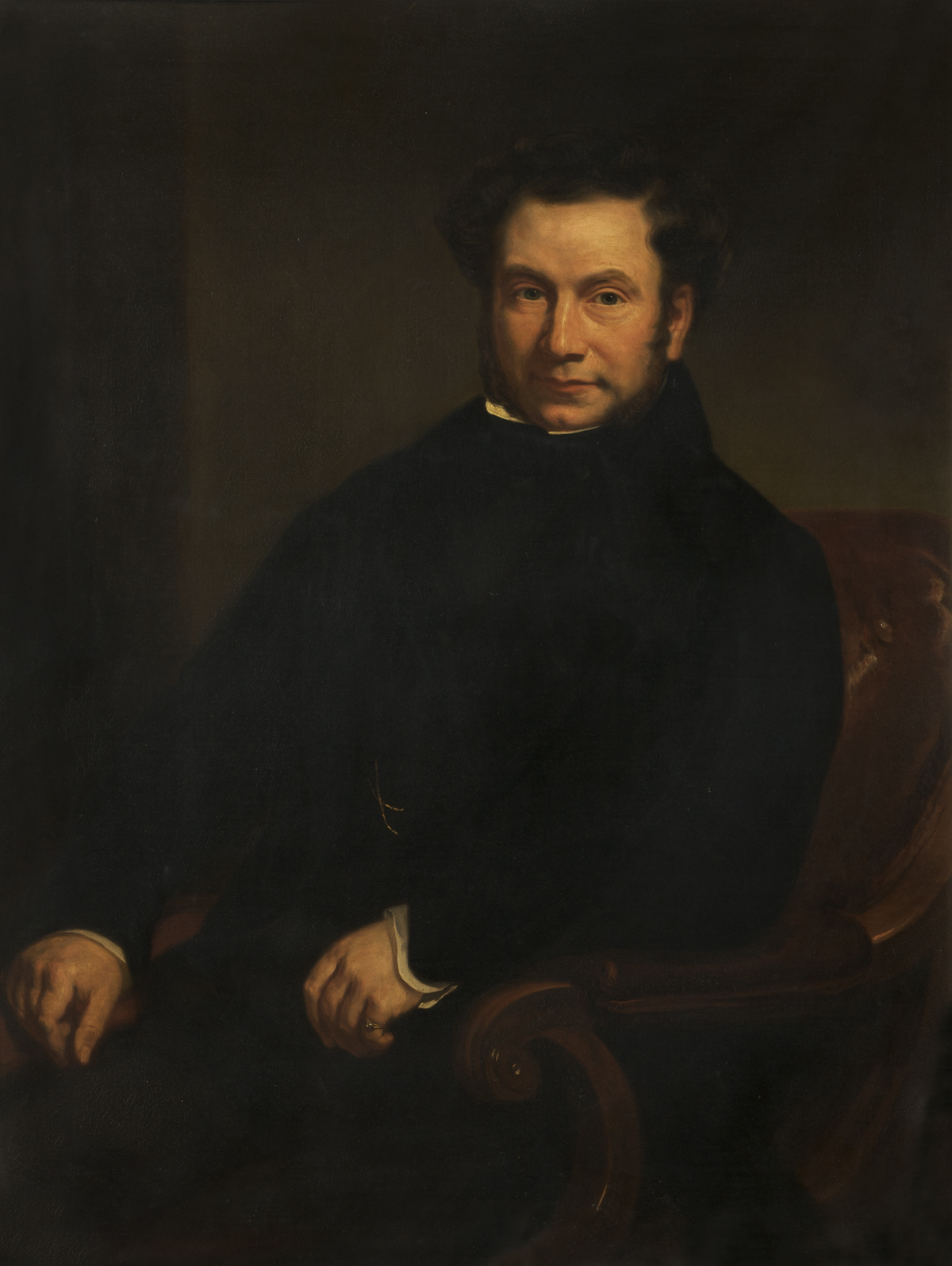
- c.1840 by George Patten ARA (1801–1865)
- Born: 1 August 1790; Huddersfield, Yorkshire, England
- Died: 9 September 1842 (aged 52); Bolton, Lancashire, England
- Occupations: Civil and Mechanical engineer Architectural designer Company director
- Known for: Steam engines Locomotives; Architecture; Art Collector
- Notable work: 3-cylinder locomotive Aerodynamic disc wheel Hydraulic press Radial Drilling machine 2-cylinder beam engine

Benjamin Hick (1 August 1790 – 9 September 1842) was an English civil and mechanical engineer, art collector and patron whose improvements to the steam engine and invention of scientific tools were held in high esteem by the engineering profession; some of Hick's improvements became public property without claiming the patent rights he was entitled to or without their source being known.

== Early Career and developments ==
He was born at Huddersfield, and christened in the Independent, dissenter's chapel at Highfield, his parents moving shortly afterwards to Leeds where he was educated. Henry Venn was vicar of Huddersfield parish until 1771.

Hick's aptitude for mechanics and passion for drawing led to an apprentiship in 1804 (age 14) as a draughtsman with Fenton, Murray and Wood at the Round Foundry in Holbeck. The company made steam engines, textile and other machinery; here he was entrusted with the installation of several large steam engines and offered a partnership when his apprenticeship expired. The offer was declined and Hick moved instead to Bolton in 1810 to work for Smalley, Thwaites and Company as manager of Rothwell's Union Foundry on Blackhorse Street.

His brother John Hick also trained as an engineer, in 1808 John left Fenton, Murray & Wood to take up the position of "book-keeper and traveller" for John Sturges and Co. at the Bowling Iron Works near Bradford.

In July 1820 Hick joined other leading industrialists Isaac Dobson, Thomas Hardcastle and Peter Rothwell together with engineer and brother-in-law, Joshua Routledge to form the Bolton Gaslight and Coke Company, providing gas for public buildings, street lamps and industrial lighting. With the inevitable fire risk of naked flame, the Great Bolton Trustees and a number of mill owners bought horse-drawn fine engines; Hick became a Trustee of Great Bolton during the early 1820s, he was an Anglican and prominent member of Bolton's Pitt Club, formed 1809 as a "political organisation composed of the admirers of William Pitt", that helped Hick move amongst the middle class social elite of the time.

The Dobsons (Isaac and Benjamin), Hick, Rothwell, John Kennedy and others were members of a "prosecution" club (formed 1801), meeting at the Black Horse pub in Bolton, that in 1824 secured an annuity for the inventor and fellow member Samuel Crompton, who also frequented the Inn. Hick joined the Institution of Civil Engineers in the same year, proposed by Joshua Field, Joseph Farey and James Jones. Also with Rothwell and the Dobsons, Hick was a prominent member of the Black Horse Club, that met "to discuss not only business matters but the most interesting topics affecting that period".

Together with many other leading figures from the Bolton area, including those from the Black Horse Club, Hick was a promoter and with Peter Rothwell an original shareholder of the Bolton and Leigh Railway that opened 1 August 1828 with the naming of the locomotive Lancashire Witch by Mrs Hulton, wife of the vilified William Hulton JP, High Sheriff of Lancashire and collier. Robert Stephenson was driver of the engine he designed and built with chief engineer George Stephenson, who was a passenger with the other guests. Following the occasion that gathered crowds of 40–50 thousand people, in October 1828, Hick and Rothwell received Robert Peel, then home secretary, as a guest at their foundry.

In 1837 Hick was, among other local figures including Thomas Ridgway (1778–1839), Edward Bolling, John Hargreaves elder (1780–1860) and Jr, a member of the Provisional Committee of the Bolton and Preston Railway. By 1841 Hick was Deputy chairman and a Director with chairman John Hargreaves; the two families (Hick and Hargreaves) were linked by marriage in 1836. Chief engineer was John Urpeth Rastrick and resident engineer Alexander James Adie, son of Alexander Adie inventor of the sympiesometer. The line opened 22 June 1843 after Hick's death, following some problems in its construction, and merged with the North Union Railway Company 10 May 1844. Hick's executorial trustee, solicitor and banker Thomas Lever Rushton (1810–1883), by then a director of the railway, was part of the negotiating committee for the merger.

According to the records of Charles Beyer and an appraisal by John Farey, Hick was apparently responsible for pioneering the use of high-pressure and compound steam engines in textile mills, following the designs of Arthur Woolf. Hick's engines should probably be considered best practice for the time c.1841.

Locomotives built by Hick were of the best quality, Edward Bury considered them "extremely well made" and they were used by the London and Birmingham Railway for the very first scheme of standardisation of parts.

== Rothwell, Hick and Rothwell ==
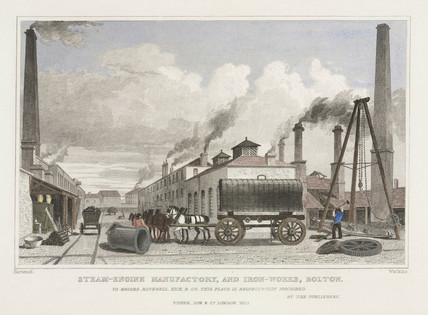
"Steam-Engine Manufactory and Iron-Works, Bolton. To Messrs. Rothwell, Hick & Co. This plate is respectfully inscribed by the publishers. Fisher, Son and Co. of London 1832." Engraving by William Watkins after a drawing by John Harwood. Originally published in William Henry Pyne's partwork Lancashire Illustrated, from Original Drawings (1828–1831).

By 1821 Hick was managing partner of the Union Foundry, that later became Rothwell, Hick and Rothwell; the company listed in Baines' directory as supplying steam engines, hydraulic presses, weighing machines, gas light apparatus, mill machinery, sugar mills and constructors of fire proof buildings. After Peter Rothwell's death 2 August 1824, the firm continued with Peter Rothwell Jr (1792–1849) as Rothwell, Hick & Co. They made stationary steam engines, (a number of which were featured by John Farey in the second volume of his Treatise on the Steam Engine, 1827) as well as general engineering products including cast iron dockyard cranes.

In 1824 when the prodigious and forward looking Swiss engineer Johann Georg Bodmer (anglicised to John George Bodmer) developed his patterns and textile machinery near Bolton he made use of the Rothwell, Hick and Rothwell workshops. Here in the late 1820s with the co-operation of an Italian merchant, Philip Novelli and H. & E. Ashworth, (Henry (1794–1880) and Edmund (1800–1881) Ashworth), they began a project of advanced concept at Egerton Mill to include a spectacular waterwheel of 62 feet diameter by 12 feet wide and 110–140 horsepower, completed by Fairbairn and Lillie when Bodmer returned to Europe as a result of ill-health. To aid in the construction it is claimed that Bodmer devised the travelling crane; the Egerton wheel became a tourist destination during the 1830s and 1840s, it was one of the largest in the United Kingdom attracting visits from industrialists and politicians. Benjamin Disraeli was a visitor to the Ashworth mills in 1843. By the 1830s Hick had become a highly valued friend of Bodmer, on one occasion arbitrating a patent dispute.

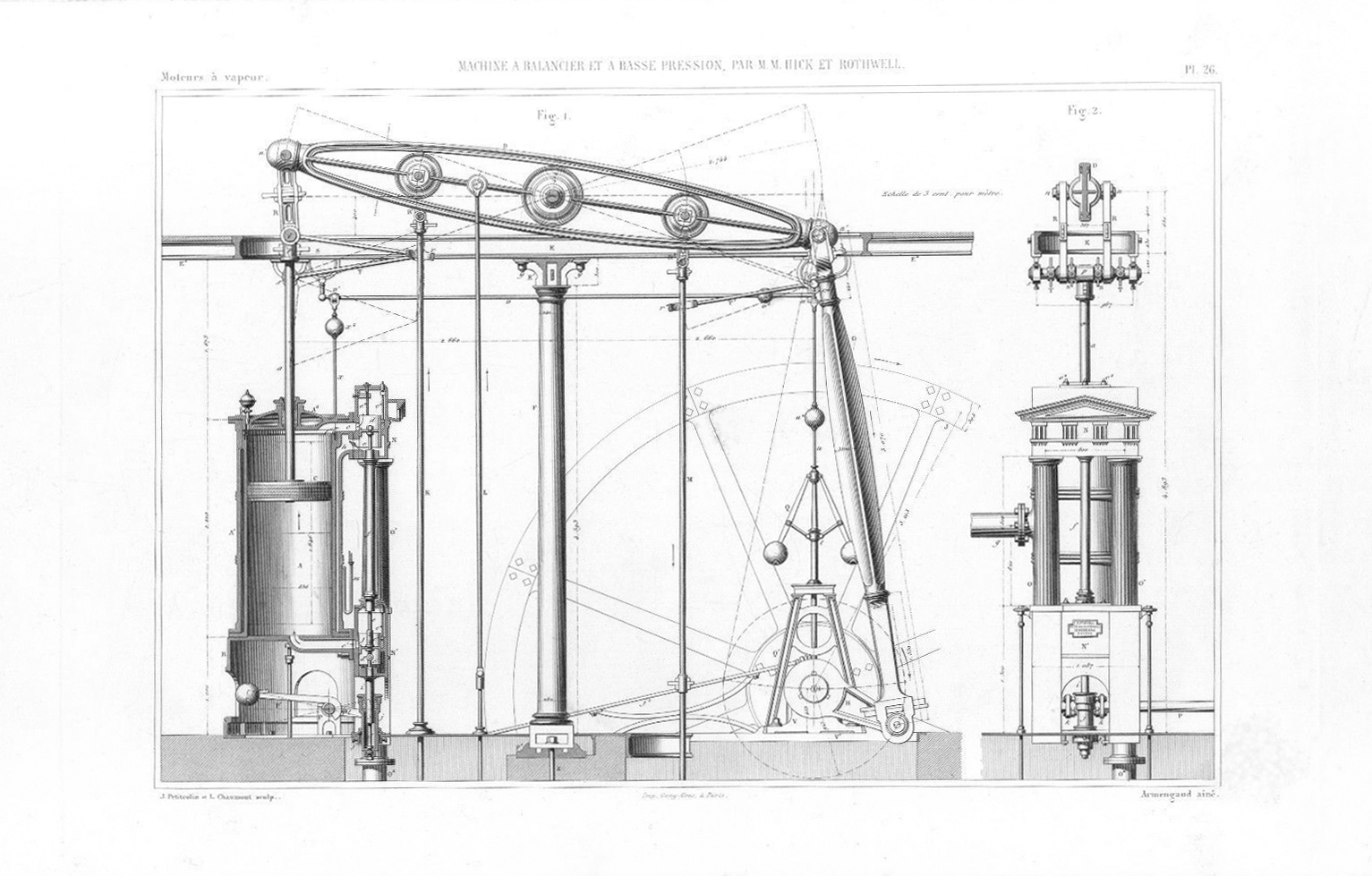
Technical drawing of a balance and low pressure steam engine by Rothwell, Hick and Rothwell with architectural details in the Doric order. Traité Théorique et pratique des moteurs a vapeur, Jacques-Eugène Armengaud 1862.

Hick also formed a close friendship with engineer and artist James Nasmyth, in his autobiography Nasmyth refers to Hick as a "most admirable man... whose judgment in all matters connected with engineering and mechanical construction was held in the very highest regard...", he ingeniously "contrived and constructed... one of the most powerful hydraulic presses" in existence. Hick was inventor of the self tightening collar, used universally in the hydraulic press.

According to Nasmyth, Hick and William Fairbairn were among the most "intelligent and cultivated persons in Lancashire". Hick was an accomplished draughtsman and it is stated that he introduced almost a new era of elegance and design for the exterior forms of steam engines and larger works.

Hick and Rothwell built their first locomotive Union in 1830 for the Bolton and Leigh Railway, they also built Pioneer for the Petersburg Railroad in America and a 2-2-0, the Pontchartrain for the Pontchartrain Railroad, New Orleans in 1832.

== Architecture and public works ==
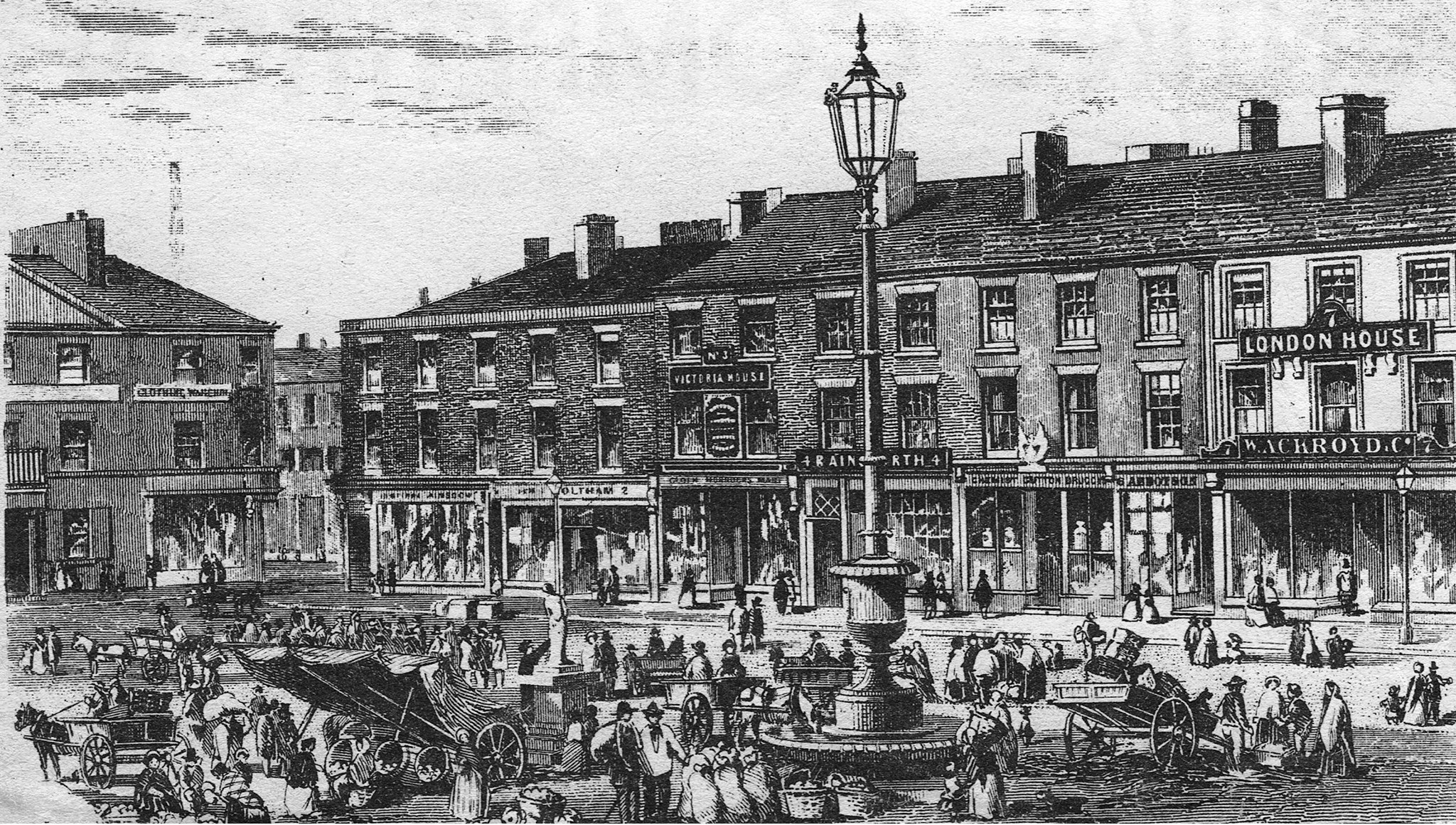
Engraving of Bolton New Market Place c.1859 with Benjamin Hick's centre piece gas light mounted on the form of a Neo-classical urn, complimented by John Hick's circular cattle fountain.

Hick's talent and reputation as a draughtsman lead to requests for his design of public buildings in Bolton: the Dispensary (1825), Nelson Square (demolished); Cloth Hall, Market Street (demolished); Gas Works (demolished) and Water Works. Waterworks cottage (1824), Belmont remains today. The Dispensary is referred to in Pevsner's South Lancashire: The Industrial and Commercial South. Thomas Allen's, Lancashire Illustrated, from Original Drawings. considers, "The gas and waterworks also are eminently deserving of notice. Bolton will long retain memorials of its numerous obligations to the superior genius, public exertions and enterprising spirit of Mr. Benjamin Hick". Hick designed a Gas Pillar and presented it for the opening of Bolton's New Market Place (1826), claimed to be the finest uncovered market in the country; about November 1859 his son John Hick gifted a circular "cattle fountain" round the base, both gaslight and trough remained a feature of the square until 1925, the pillar described in 1825 as "a piece of elegant and classical workmanship" and "justly the admiration of persons of taste". Rothwell, Hick and Rothwell contributed elaborate iron work screens with anthemion patterns to Preston Corn Exchange (1822–24).

Hick designed a heating system for Richard Lane's The Oaks (demolished), an imposing Ionic villa conceived in 1838, and home of Quaker, Henry Ashworth. Hick's grandson, also Benjamin Hick (1845–1882) was architect of changes made to Lane's Exchange and Library (1825–29), New Market Place (renamed Victoria Square in 1897) about 1871, his grandfather was among the 80 shareholders of all political and religious persuasions.

== B. Hick and Sons ==
In 1814 Benjamin Hick married Elizabeth Routledge (1783–1826) sister of his companion, Joshua Routledge (1773–1829), an engineer and ironmonger living in Bolton, and former manager for Fenton, Murray and Wood. Hick's father-in-law, William Routledge, was a blacksmith and Wesleyan lay minister at Elvington, a village about 8 miles south-east of York in Yorkshire. Joshua Routledge's sons were also engineers; William (1812–1882), a driver of the locomotive Phoenix at the opening of the Liverpool and Manchester Railway 1828, in 1852 master engineer at New Bridge Brass Foundry and partner in Routledge & Ommanney, Salford. Henry (1817–1884), manager of Bolton brass founders J. and W. Kirkham in 1882.

Benjamin Hick had five children, two sons John (1815–1894) and Benjamin (1818–1845) who he trained as engineers; on 10 April 1833 they set up their own manufactory, B. Hick and Sons, at the Soho Foundry, Crook Street, Bolton. The firm built the locomotive Soho bought by carrier John Hargreaves with six first class carriages for the Bolton and Leigh Railway, and soon became well known as suppliers to British and foreign railway companies. Three years later Hick's first child and eldest daughter Mary (1813–1878) married John Hargreaves Jr (1800–1874), manufacturer and operator of the Bolton & Leigh and Leigh & Kenyon Junction railways.

After Elizabeth's death he married Hannah Elizabeth Goodyer (c.1791–1862) in 1827 at St Mary's church, Lambeth. Hannah was a daughter of Landon Goodyer who held a position of responsibility in a Fire Office, and sister of Frederick Goodyer who was to become a highly regarded Metropolitan Police Officer under Home Secretary, Robert Peel. The first daughter by Hick's second wife married the second and only surviving son of Johann Georg Bodmer (1786–1864), his youngest daughter married the fourth son of James Bodmer.

Hick was also linked by his mother-in-law Hannah Goodyer, née Schwenck, to the Naval surgeon and novelist William Gilbert, father of William Schwenck Gilbert of Gilbert and Sullivan, his first daughter from his marriage to Hannah Goodyer was named in a similar fashion; Helen Schwenck Hick. Hannah Goodyer's father John Adam Schwenck was treasurer of the congregation of St Mary le Strand, formerly partner in Bourdorff and Schwenck, sugar refiners on Millbank Street, in the parish of St. John the Evangelist, Westminster and a director of the Phoenix Fire Office.

== Patron of the arts ==
Benjamin Hick was both a serious collector and patron of the arts alongside other wealthy industrialists and bankers from the North of England in the mid-nineteenth century, including Samuel Ashton, William Bashall of Bashall & Boardman, John Chapman, Henry Cooke, Benjamin Dobson, Sir John Gladstone, John Miller, Thomas Miller Jr of Preston, John Naylor of Leyland & Bullins and Peter Rothwell who favoured English art particularly that depicting nature and history.

A man of "acknowledged taste and judgment"; Hick's private collection built over a period of 30 years "valuable, well known and much admired", comprised works of the Italian, Flemish, Dutch and British Masters. He was regarded as "one of the most liberal of the provincial patrons of Art", generous in his support of the British school, in particular a friend of Henry Liverseege who painted several works for Hick, and "on terms of intimacy" with many artists. The collection consisted of antiques, bronzes, engravings by George Thomas Doo, John Henry Robinson and foreign engravers, marbles, paintings and watercolour drawings.

Foreign works included amongst others those of: Canaletti, Annibale Carracci, Carlo Cignani, Correggio, Aelbert Cuyp, Carlo Dolci, Gerrit Dou, Albrecht Dürer, Sassoferato, Carlo Maratti, Murillo, Parmigianino, Gaspar Poussin, Raffaelle, Paolo Veronese, Egbert van Heemskerck the Younger, Wouwermans, Paul Potter, Peter Paul Rubens, David Teniers, Brawer, Gerard Dow, Anton Raphael Mengs, Jan Miel, Ostate, Backhuysen, Platzer, Claude Joseph Vernet and Van Stry.

Hick's support for the British school extended to: Samuel Austin, Thomas Barker, William Roxby Beverly, John Boaden, William Bradley, Augustus Wall Callcott, George Cattermole, Thomas Sidney Cooper, James Wilson Carmichael, David Cox, James Francis Danby, Samuel Drummond, Charles Lock Eastlake, Copley Fielding, Henry Fuseli, John Rogers Herbert, Henry Howard, John Prescott Knight, William Linton, Henry Liverseege, Frederick Richard Lee, Philip James de Loutherbourg, John Martin, George Morland, Frederick Nash, the Nasmyths, Paul Falconer Poole, Samuel Prout, Thomas Miles Richardson, David Roberts, John Rhodes, William Shayer, Clarkson Frederick Stanfield, Caleb Robert Stanley, Philip Francis Stephanoff, Thomas Stothard, John Tennant, Thomas Uwins, Alfred Vickers, Benjamin West, Richard Westall, David Wilkie, John Wilson, Richard Wilson, John Michael Wright, John Christian Zeitter and others.

During 1831, engravings by William Miller, Edward Goodall and Edward Finden after works by Linton, Austin and Westall were published from Hick's collection in literary annual, The Winter's Wreath, associated with the prose and verse of Henry Chorley, Felicia Hemans and Mary Howitt.

Having the "greatest reverence for Works of Art and Books", Hick's intention was to establish a Public Picture Gallery in Bolton, with "the conviction that such Works of Art would tend to greatly improve the taste and cultivate the better feeling of the rising generation". He obtained designs for the project, but did not live to see them through. As a boy he looked forward to becoming an Artist.

== Collection ==
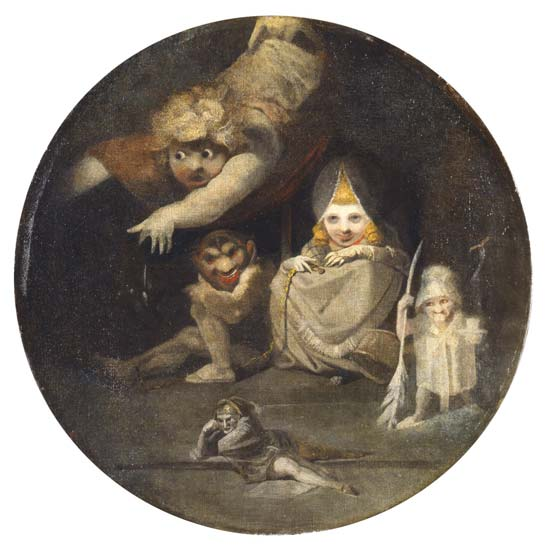
Cobweb (Shakespeare's A Midsummer Night's Dream) by Henry Fuseli, 1785-6.

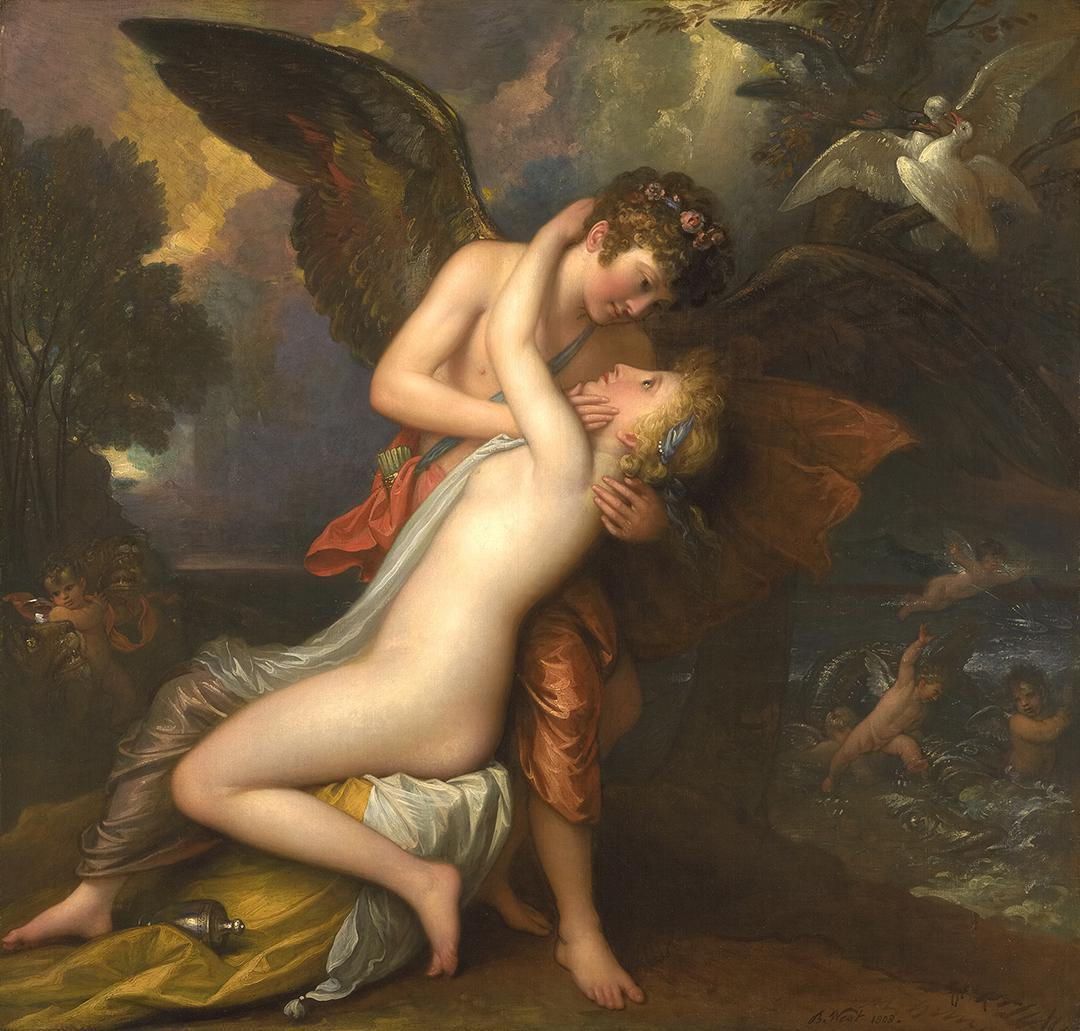
Cupid and Psyche by Benjamin West PRA, 1808.

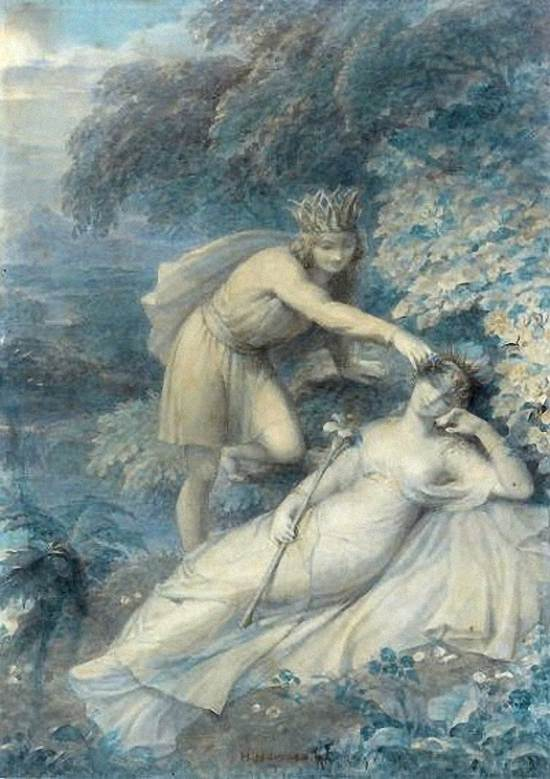
Oberon and Titania by Henry Howard.

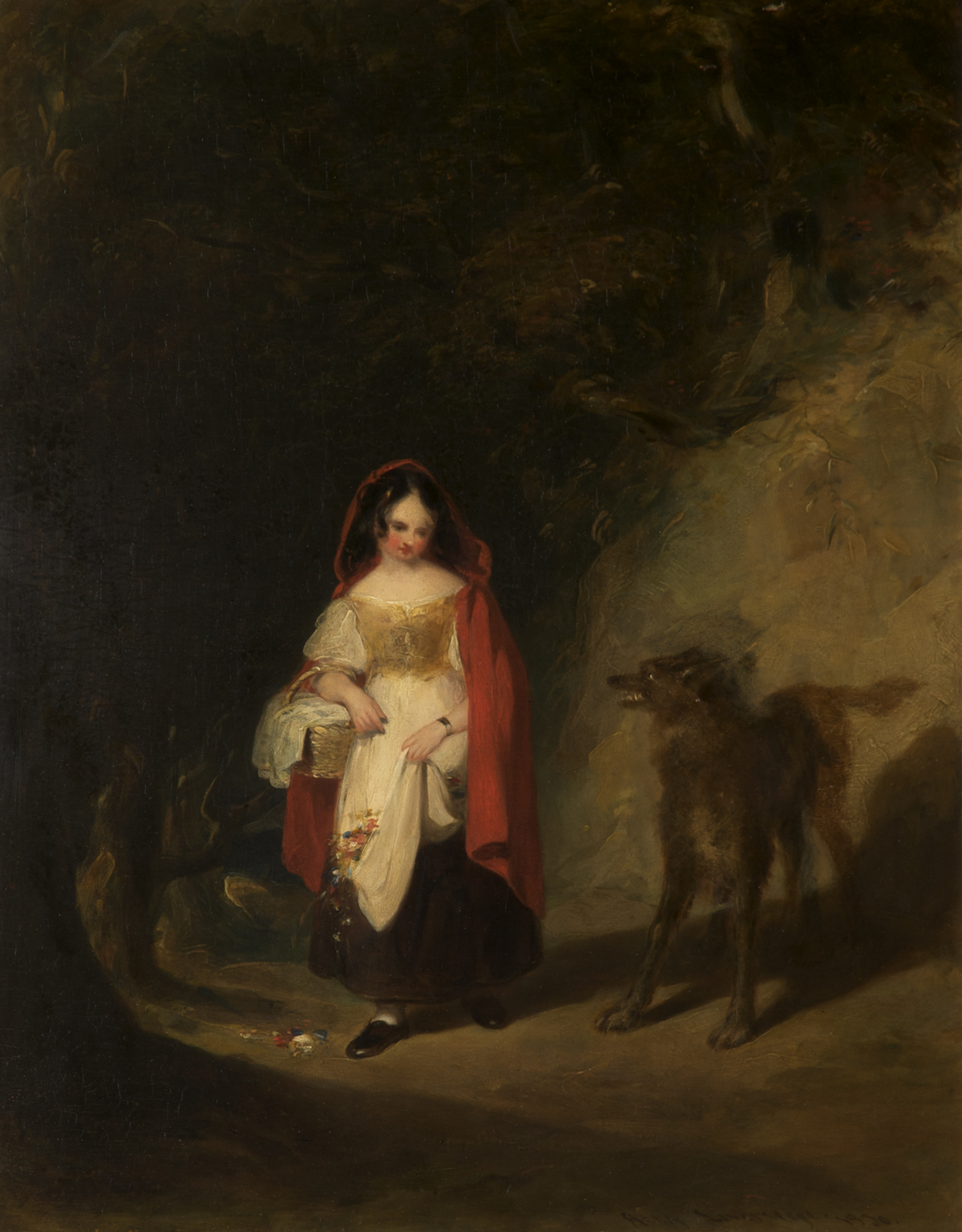
Little Red Riding Hood by Henry Liverseege, 1830.

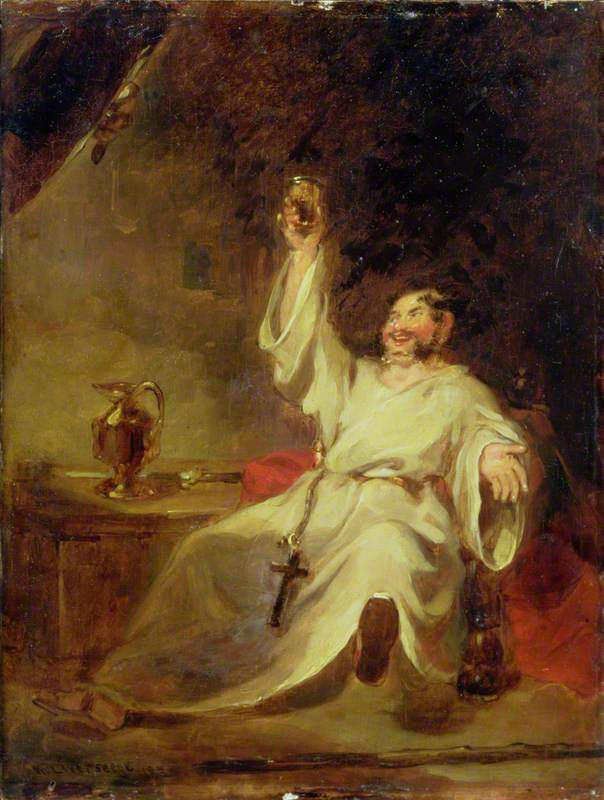
Friar Tuck by Henry Liverseege, 1830.

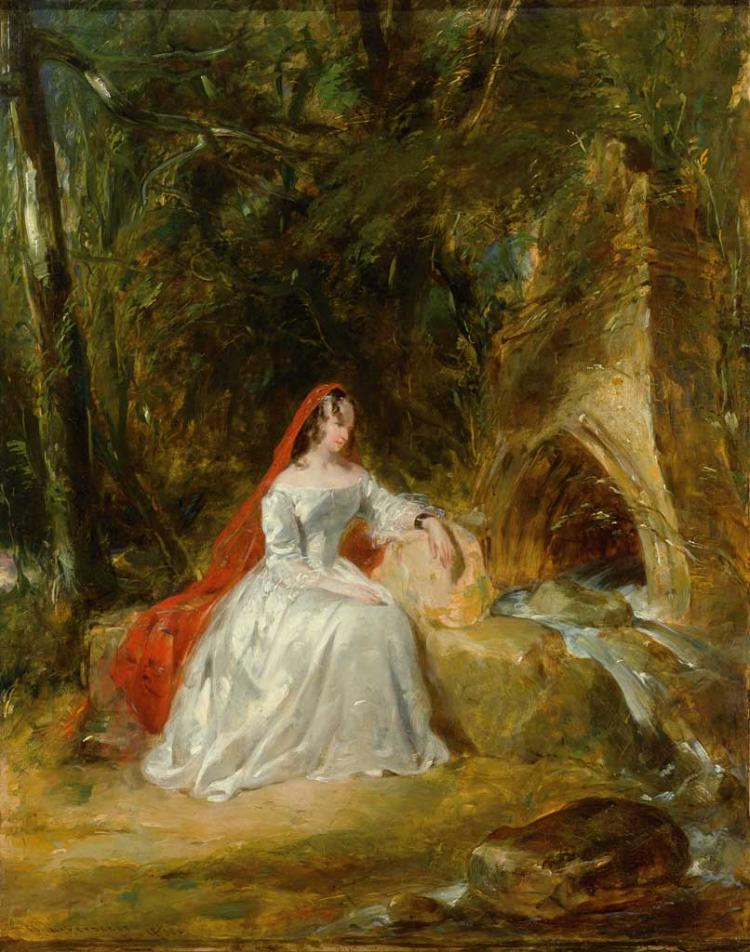
Lucy Ashton by Henry Liverseege, 1830.

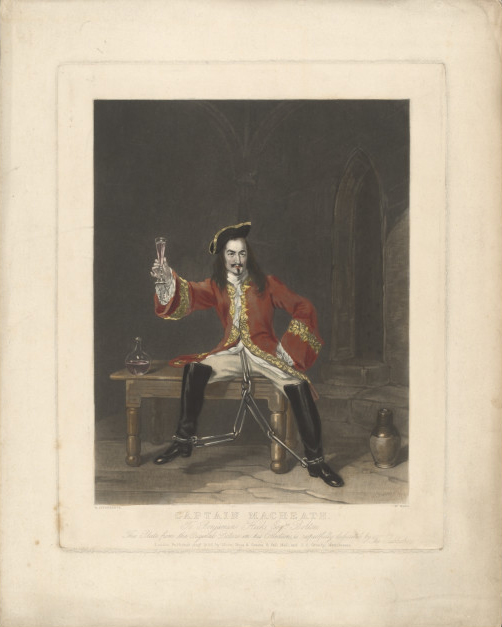
Captain Macheath by Henry Liverseege, mezzotint by William Ward, 1832.

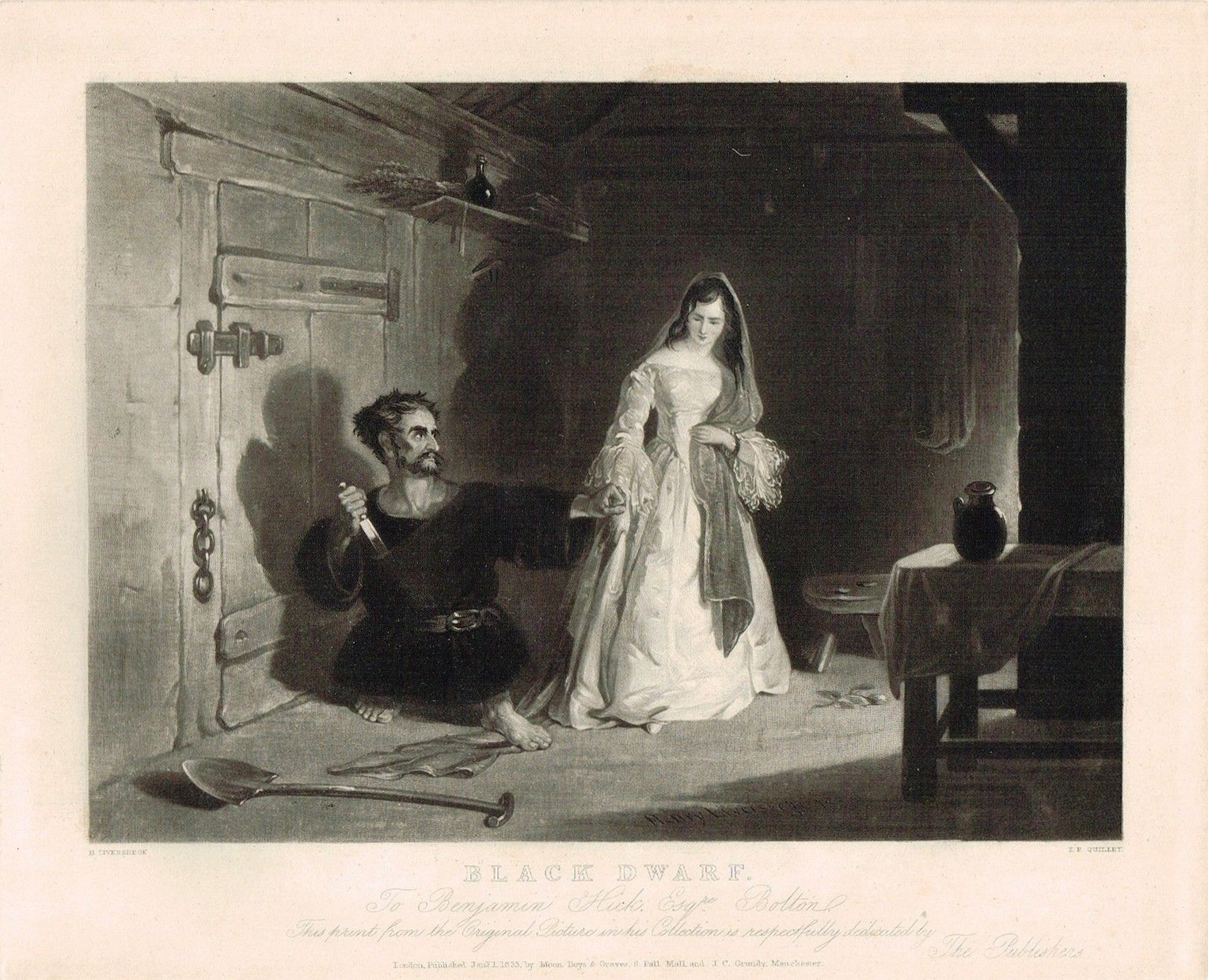
Black Dwarf by Henry Liverseege, mezzotint by J.P. Quilley, 1833. The Black Dwarf was a satirical radical journal published January 1817 – 1824 shortly after Walter Scott's The Black Dwarf in December 1816.

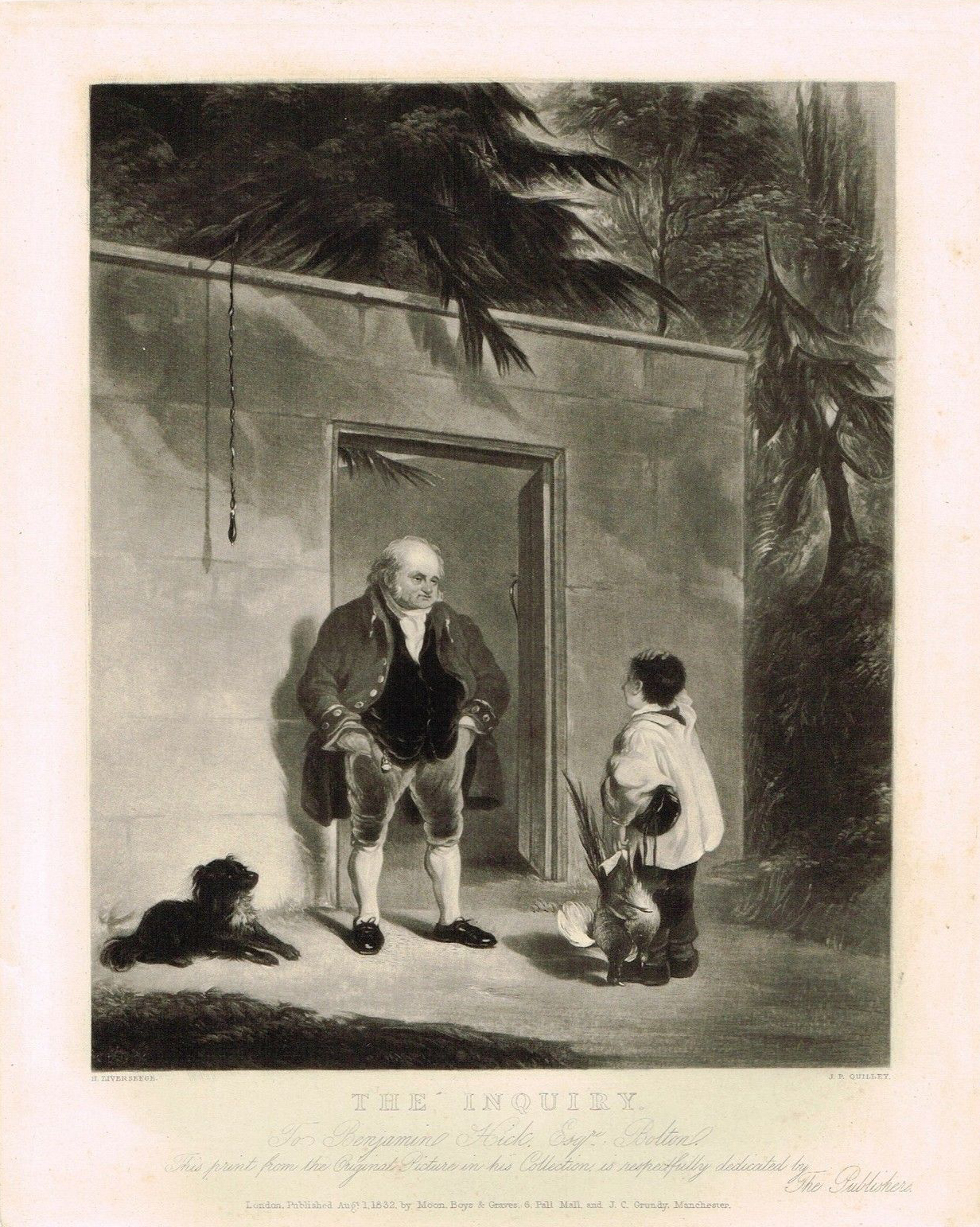
The Inquiry by Henry Liverseege, mezzotint by J.P. Quilley, 1833.

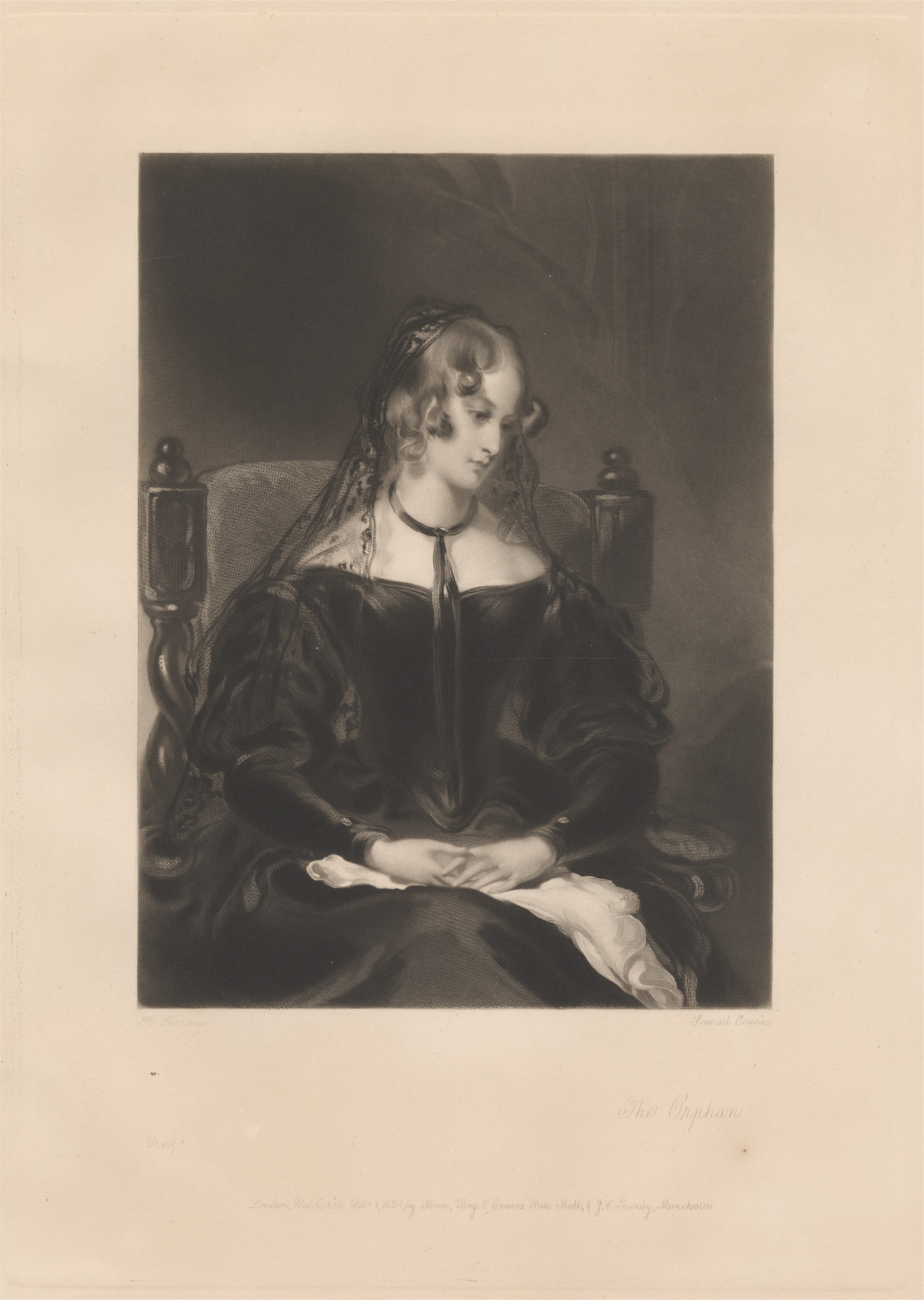
The Orphan by Henry Liverseege, mezzotint and engraving by Samuel Cousins, 1834 depicting Lady Anne Moon (d. 1870).

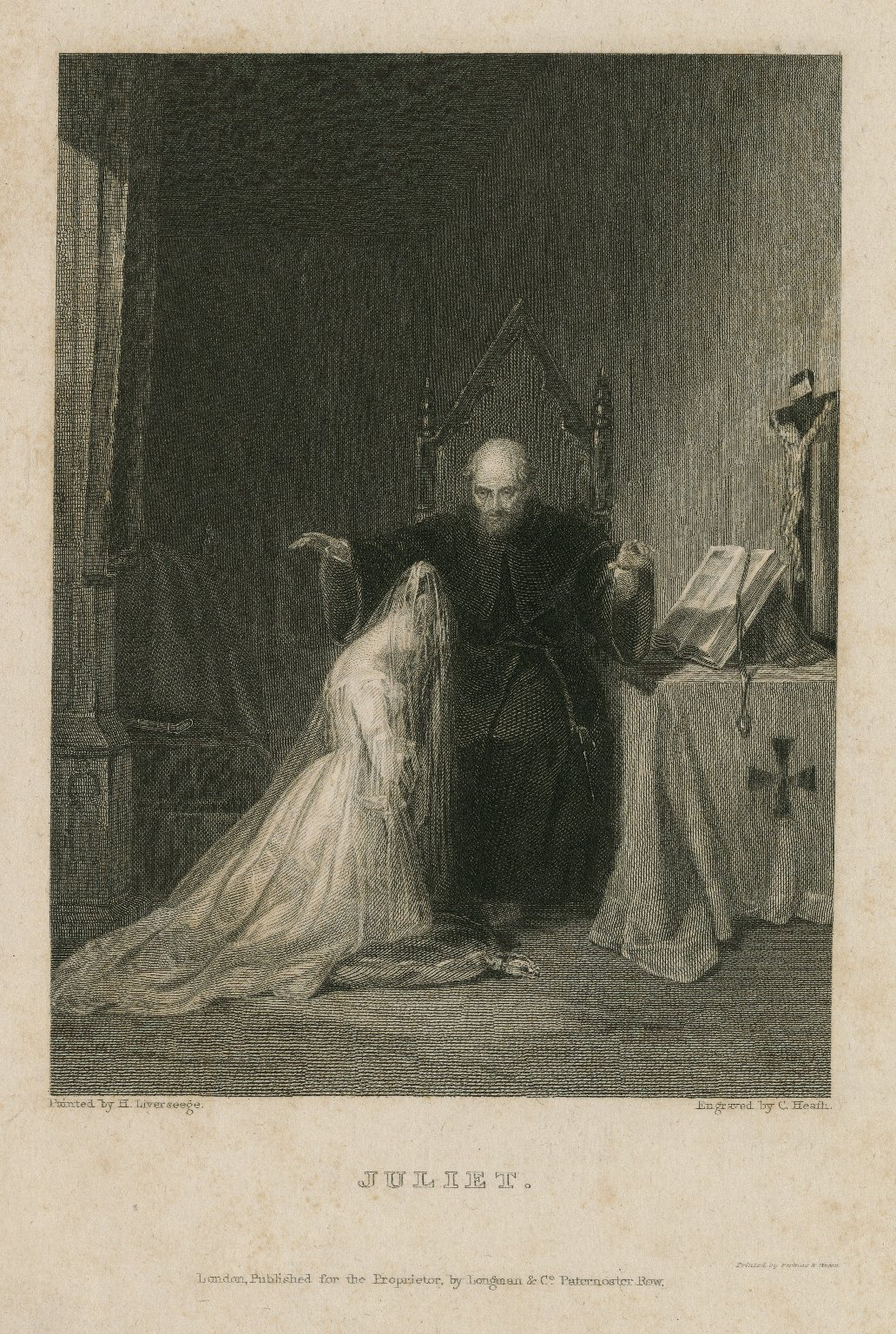
The Benediction by Henry Liverseege, depicting Juliet, engraving by Charles Heath.

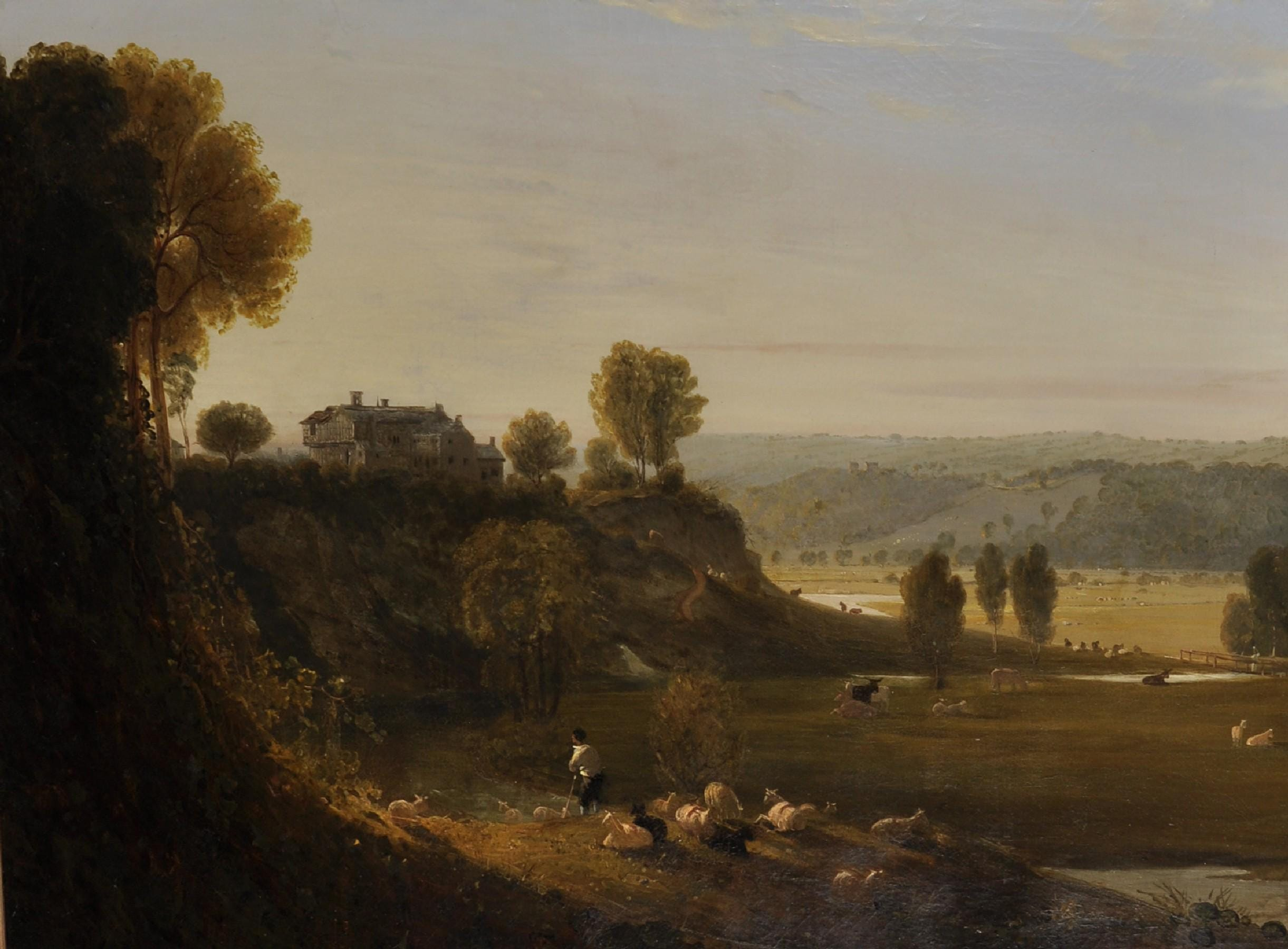
Hall i'th' Wood, near Bolton by William Linton.

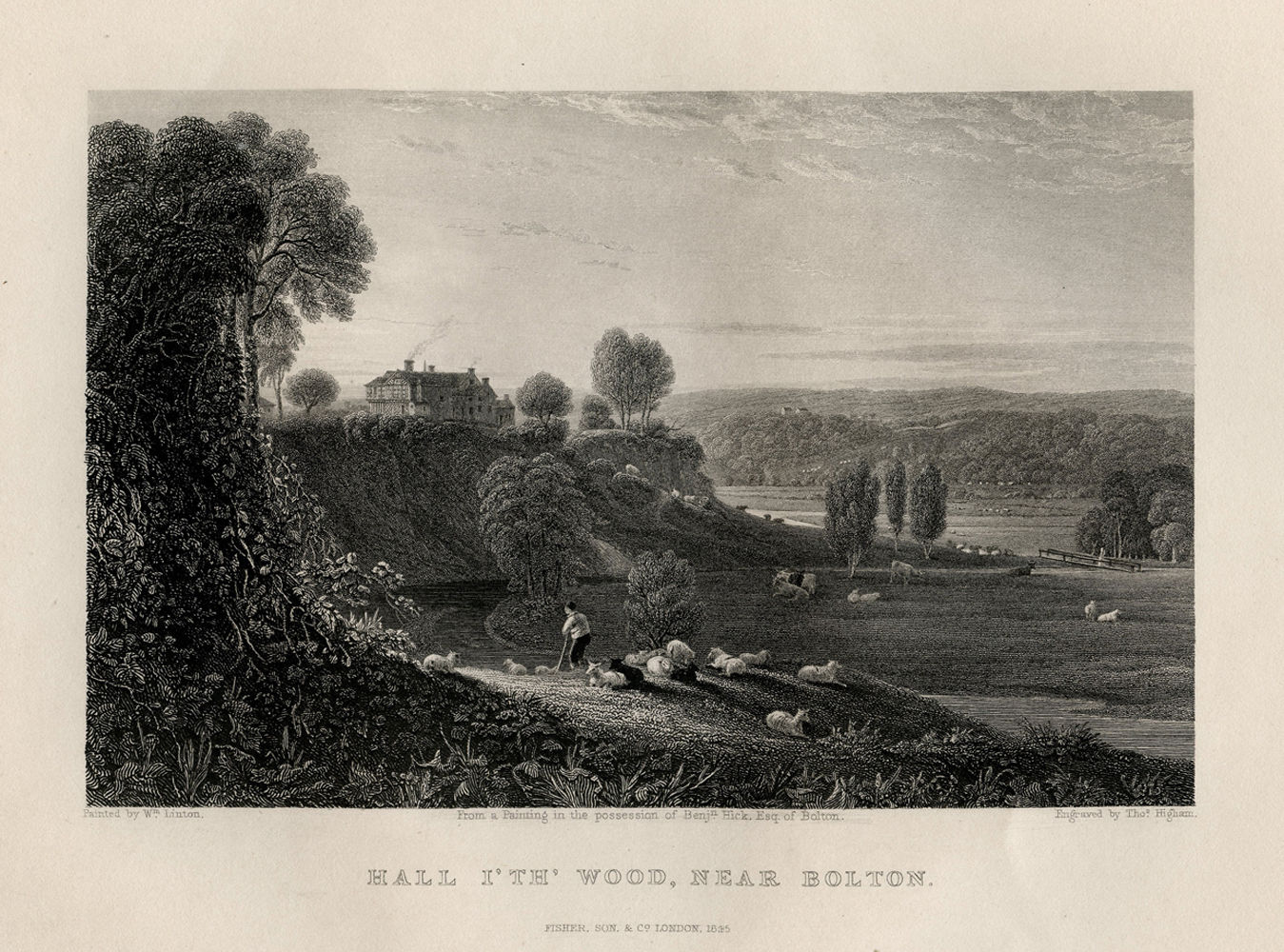
Hall i' th' Wood, near Bolton engraving by Thomas Higham after William Linton, 1835.

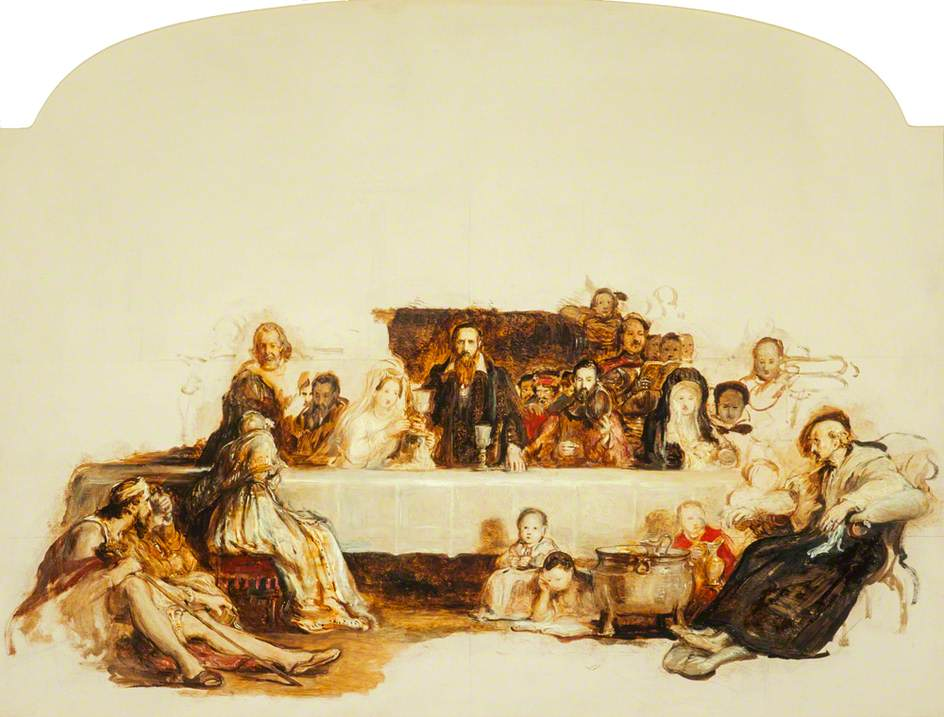
Study for John Knox Dispensing the Sacrament at Calder House by David Wilkie. The work was intended as a companion to Wilkie's Knox preaching the Reformation, in the collection of Sir Robert Peel.

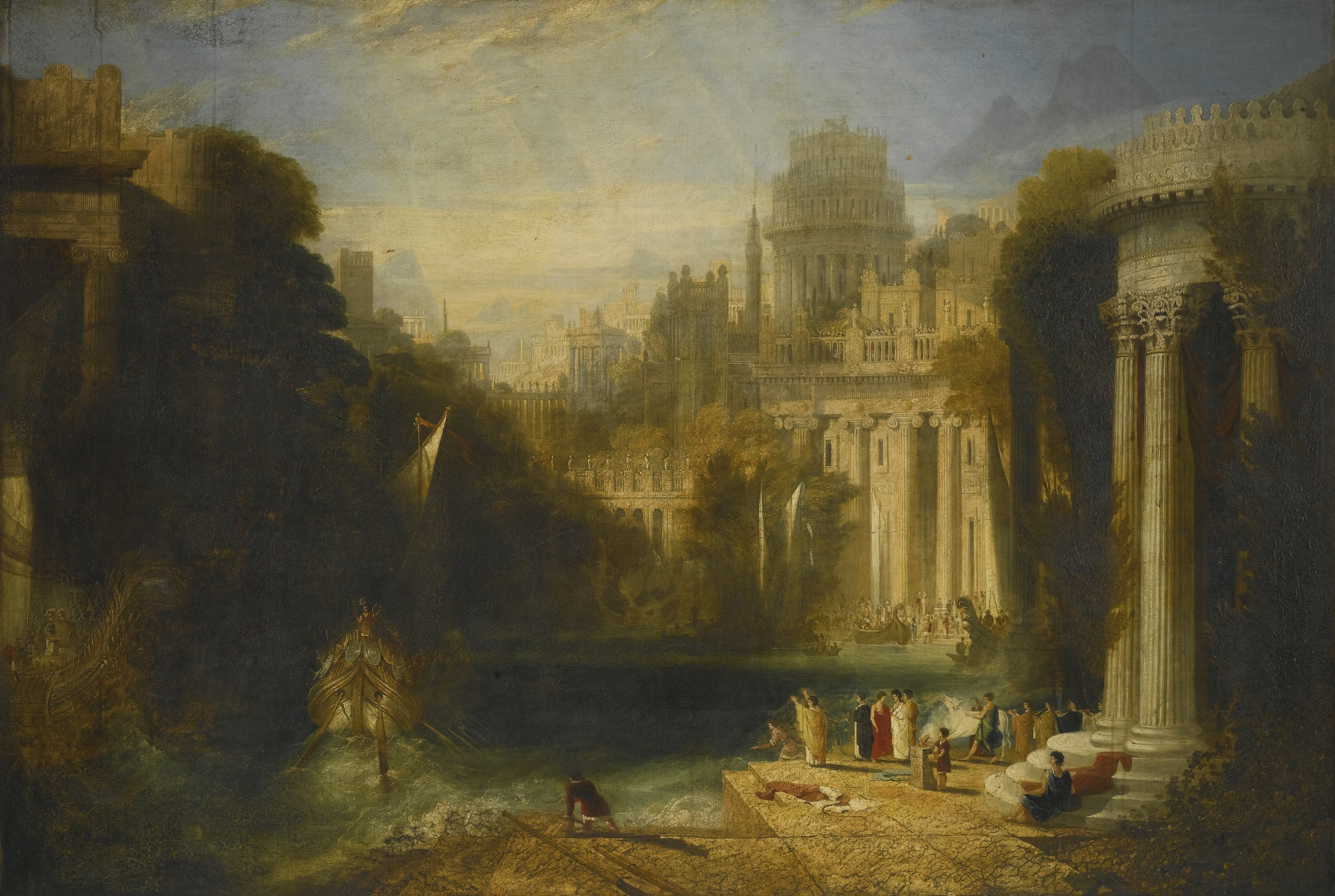
A City of Ancient Greece. With the return of a victorious armament. by William Linton, 1825.

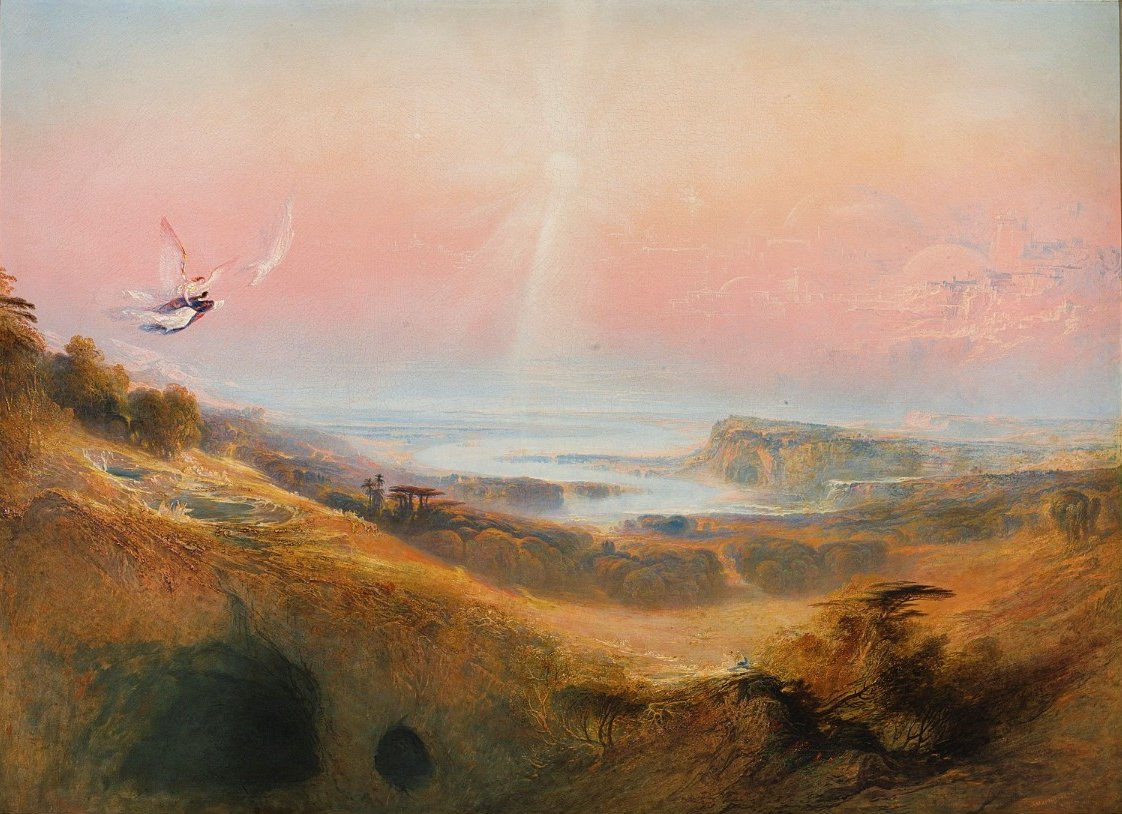
Thee, Author of all being,
Fountain of Light, thyself invisible.
The Celestial City and the River of Bliss by John Martin.

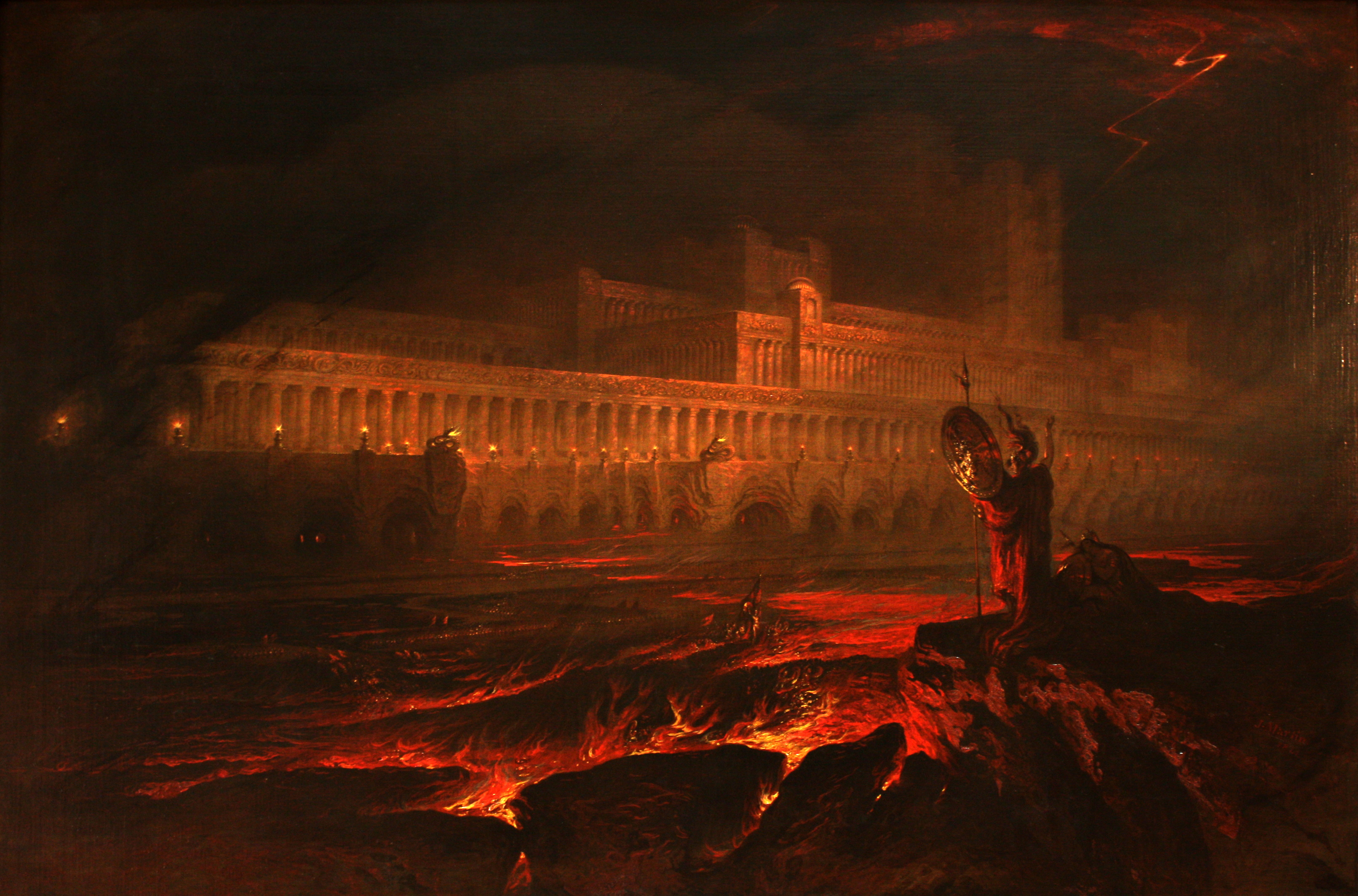
Anon out of the earth a fabric huge
Rose like an exhalation, with the sound
Of dulcet symphonies and voices sweet,
Built like a temple, where pilasters round
Were set, and Doric pillars overlaid
With golden architrave...
Pandemonium by John Martin.

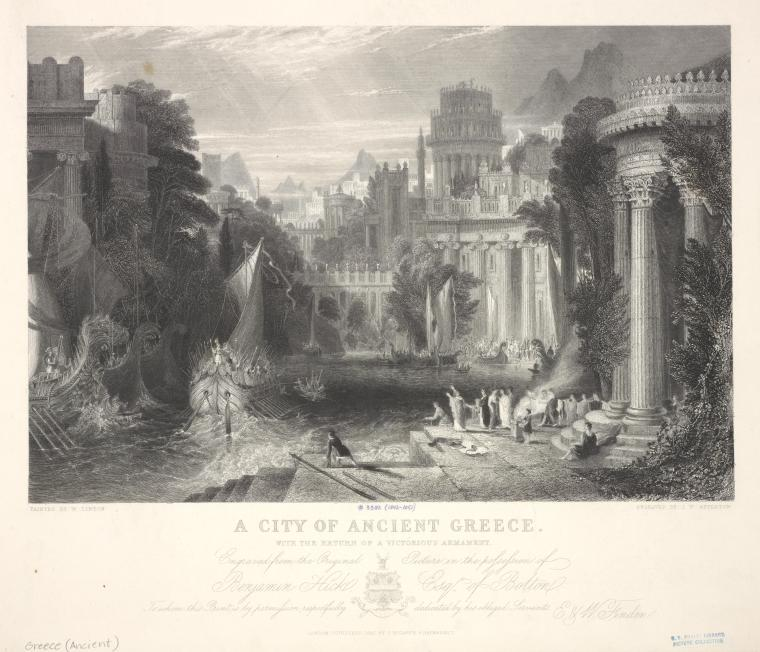
A City of Ancient Greece. With the return of a victorious armament engraving by
J. W. Appleton after William Linton, published by Edward and William Finden, 1847.

== Death ==
On 9 September 1842, Hick died suddenly at Bolton from a "disease of the heart", age 52. Following, B. Hick & Sons continued under the management of his eldest son, John Hick.

Art works from Benjamin Hick's collection were advertised in January and February 1843 editions of The Art-Union, Athenaeum and Literary Gazette, then auctioned by Thomas Winstanley & Sons of Liverpool at the Exchange Gallery in Manchester between 21 and 24 February 1843. The sale included John Martin's pair Pandemonium and The Celestial City and the River of Bliss. Both paintings were bought by Hick from the artist following their exhibition at the Royal Academy of Arts Summer Exhibition in 1841; Pandæmonium and its frame designed by Martin can be seen at the Louvre. Hick's obituary in the Art-Union appeared with those of John Varley, Lady Callcott and John Berney Crome. Details of the sale were published in the April edition of The Art-Union and May edition of The Gentleman's Magazine.

Friends of Hick from Lancashire: Robert Barlow, Joseph Beckton, Robert Daglish Jr., Jonathan Hardcastle, John Moore, John Mawdsley, Peter Rothwell and Thomas Lever Rushton formed a committee to see through the production of an engraving from Hick's portrait by George Patten. The picture was entrusted to John Grundy and Henry Cousins undertook the work in mezzotint; proofs were then published at a moderate price, examples can be found today in various museum collections.

Hick was well respected, despite his family's wish the funeral be "strictly private", more than 500 people "including a great number of influential gentlemen of the neighbourhood", attended his grave; employees of B. Hick & Son gathered nearly £200 for a memorial and despite offers of assistance "resolved unanimously to keep this honour for themselves". Benjamin Hick's memorial in Bolton Parish Church reads:

This monument is erected by a general subscription of his Workmen,
in remembrance of his Christian character
and to record virtues so rare, for future imitation;
that he, though dead, may live again
in the spirit, action, and conduct of those,
who, guided by his character, and stimulated by his example,
will learn to love their neighbour as themselves
and to do good to all men.

He was an affectionate husband,
a kind father, and a sincere friend;
alike distinguished by eminent ability,
and uniform integrity;
genius, in whatever art or science displayed,
even found in him a liberal patron;
He was benefactor to this town,
where his worth will be long appreciated;
and his loss deeply deplored.

== See also ==
- Bolton Royal Infirmary
- John Musgrave & Sons
- Charles Henry Schwanfelder
- Sharp, Roberts & Co.
- Temple Works
