= John Grundy =

John or Jack Grundy may refer to:

- John Grundy (television presenter) (born 1946), English television presenter and author
- John Grundy Sr. (c. 1696–1748), English land surveyor and civil engineer
- John Grundy Jr. (1719–1783), English civil, drainage and canal engineer
- Jack Grundy (footballer) (1873–?), English association footballer
- Jack Grundy (rugby league) (1926–1978), English rugby league player
- John Clowes Grundy (1806–1867), English printseller and art patron
- Jack Grundy (cricketer) (born 1994), English cricketer
