= John Clowes Grundy =

John Clowes Grundy (1806–1867) was an English printseller and art patron.

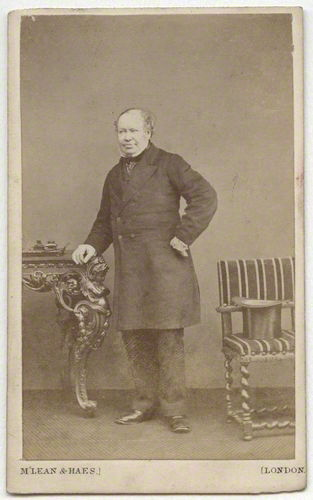
John Clowes Grundy, mid-1860s.

== Life ==
Born at Bolton, Lancashire, on 3 August 1806, he was the eldest son of John Grundy, a cotton-spinner there and Elizabeth Leeming, his wife. He was first apprenticed in a Manchester warehouse. He then worked as an assistant to the printsellers Zanetti & Agnew, with partners Vittore Zanetti and Thomas Agnew. After Zanetti's death he became partner in a similar business, at first with Charles Fox, and in 1835 with Charles Goadsby. In 1838 he carried on the business on his own account.

Grundy had a reputation as one of the best judges of engravings in the country. As a patron of art, he was the friend of local artists, such as Henry Liverseege and William Bradley, and one of the first to appreciate the talent of David Cox, Samuel Prout, and others. With his brother, Robert Hindmarsh Grundy of Liverpool, he had a share in founding the Printsellers' Association in London. Through his co-operation with Sir Francis Moon, the large volumes of David Roberts's Sketches in the Holy Land, Egypt, &c., were published.

Grundy died on 19 May 1867, while on a visit in London, and his extensive collections were then dispersed. Two of his sons carried on the business. Thomas Leeming Grundy (1808–1841) the engraver was another of his brothers.
