= Alfred Gomersal Vickers =

English marine and landscape painter (1810–1837)

Alfred Gomersal Vickers (1810–1837) was an English painter of seascapes and landscapes.

== Life ==
He was born at Lambeth on 21 April 1810, the son of Alfred Vickers (1786–1868), a landscape-painter, who taught him. He was influenced by the watercolourists François Louis Thomas Francia and Richard Parkes Bonington. He began to show his work in 1827.

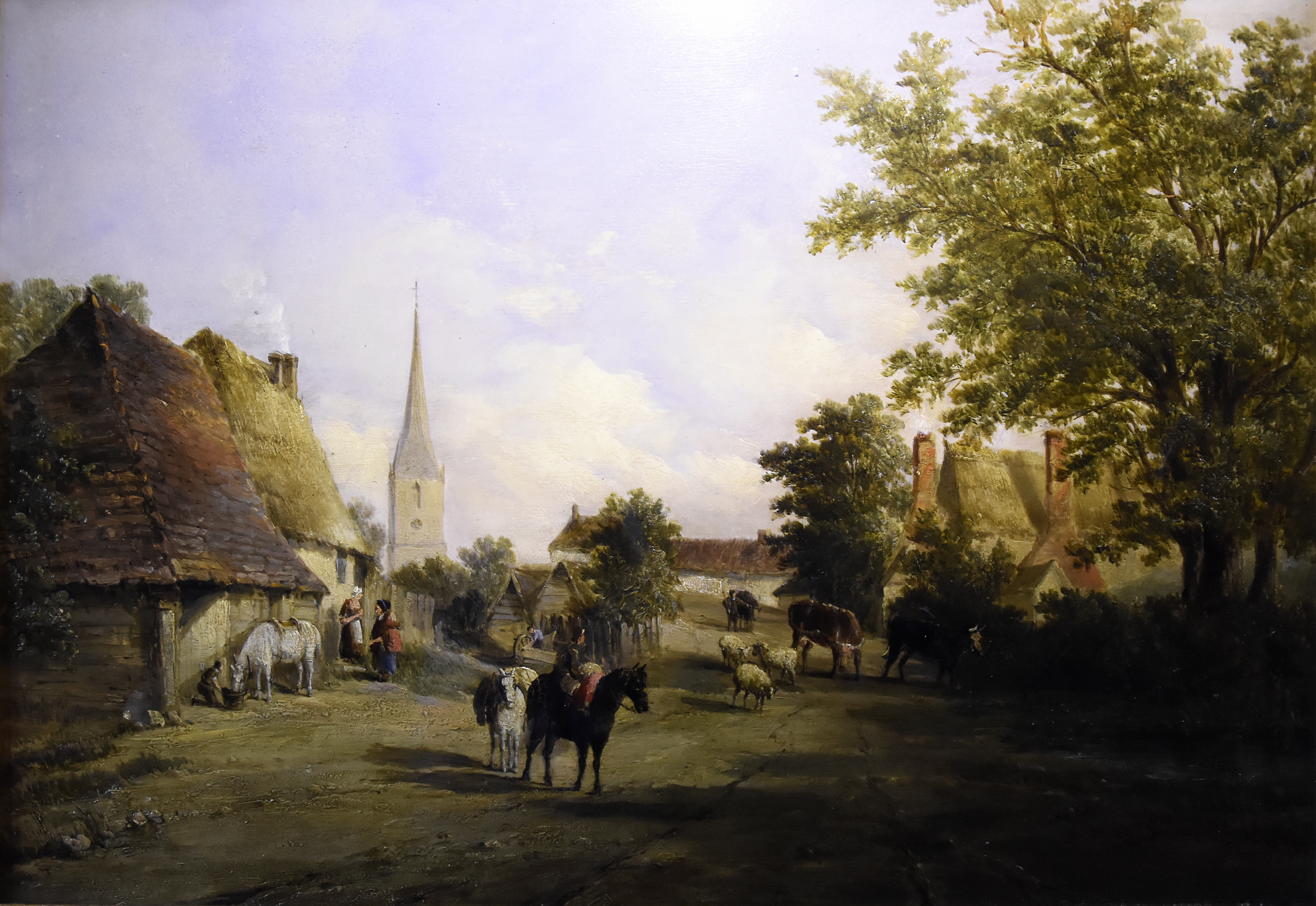
The village Hever - Hever Castle

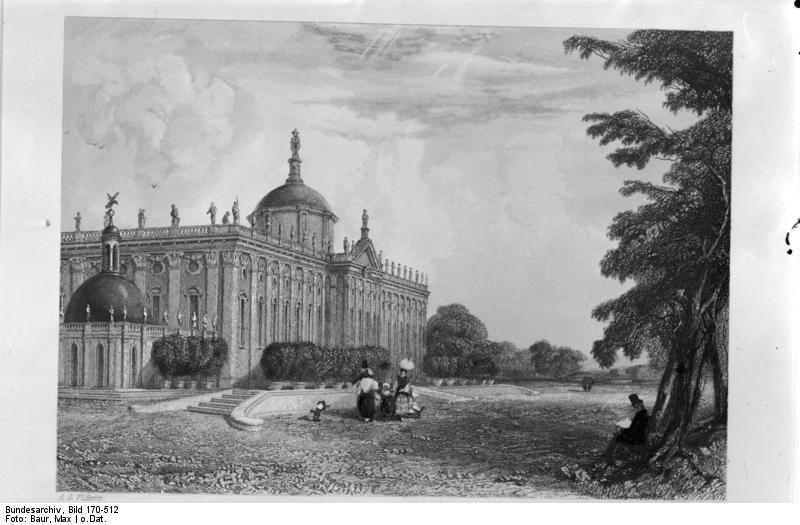
Neues Palais, Potsdam, engraving by Edward Radclyffe after Alfred Gomersal Vickers

Vickers exhibited paintings, both in oils and watercolours, at the Royal Academy, British Institution, Suffolk Street gallery, and the New Watercolour Society. He painted mainly marine subjects, but also architecture and figures.

He was married 20 April 1833 at Manchester Collegiate Church to Mary Liverseege, the younger sister of his close friend and fellow artist Henry Liverseege.

In 1833 Vickers received a commission from Charles Heath to make sketches in Russia for publication. Steel engravings from these and from many of his marine pieces appeared in the annuals for 1835–7. He was beginning to obtain public recognition when he died on 12 January 1837. His pictures were sold at Christie's on 16 February that year.
