= William Linton (artist) =

English painter

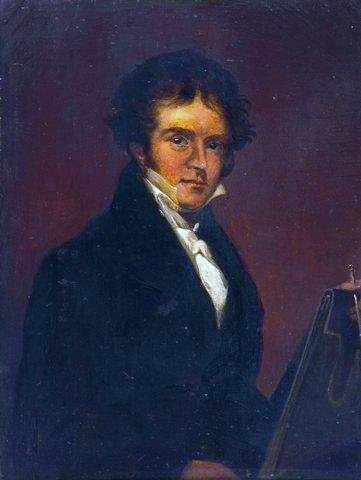
William Linton. Self-Portrait. c.1821. Bolton Museum and Art Gallery.

William Linton RBA (1791–1876) was a British landscape artist.

== Life and artistic work ==
Born in Liverpool, Linton grew up at Lancaster and Cartmel, and went to school at Windermere where later he spent holidays. At the age of sixteen he was placed in a merchant's office. He however did not like the job. For his own pleasure, he started to copy works by Claude Gellee (Lorrain, 1600–1682) and Richard Wilson (1714–1782). Eventually he made art his profession. Linton's later works still bear strong influence of Claude Lorrain's manner with its investigation of natural light effects, of Richard Wilson with his large-scale panoramic compositions, and particularly of Claude-Joseph Vernet (1714–1789) with his inclination to an idealised classical landscape.

By 1817 Linton settled in London and started to exhibit at the Royal Academy and British Institution.

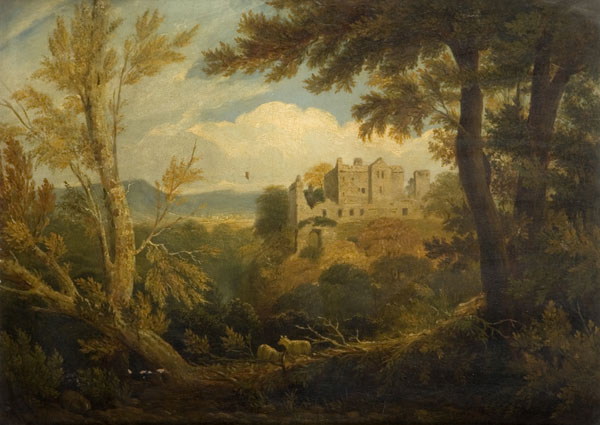
Castle Campbell. 1820s. Wolverhampton Art Gallery

At that time, his subjects often presented scenery in Scotland and in the North of England, especially in the vicinity of the Lakes.

He took an active part in the founding of the Society of British Artists in 1823-1824 and was its President in 1837.

In 1828-1829, he undertook a long sketching tour through Italy, travelling from the North to the South coast. On his second, more extended tour, he travelled around the Mediterranean, visiting the South of France, Sicily, Italy, Malta and Greece. The result of these journeys was a great number of sketches.

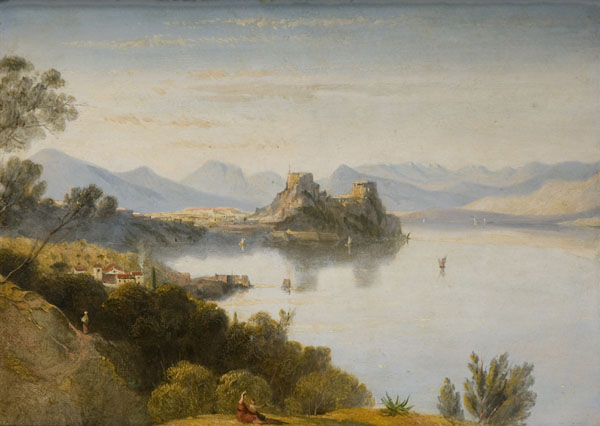
Albanian Mountains with Corfu in Distance. 1830s

These sketches were successful on their own right, but also they formed a basis for his large-scale landscape oil paintings which firmly established his reputation as a leading landscape artist in classical style.

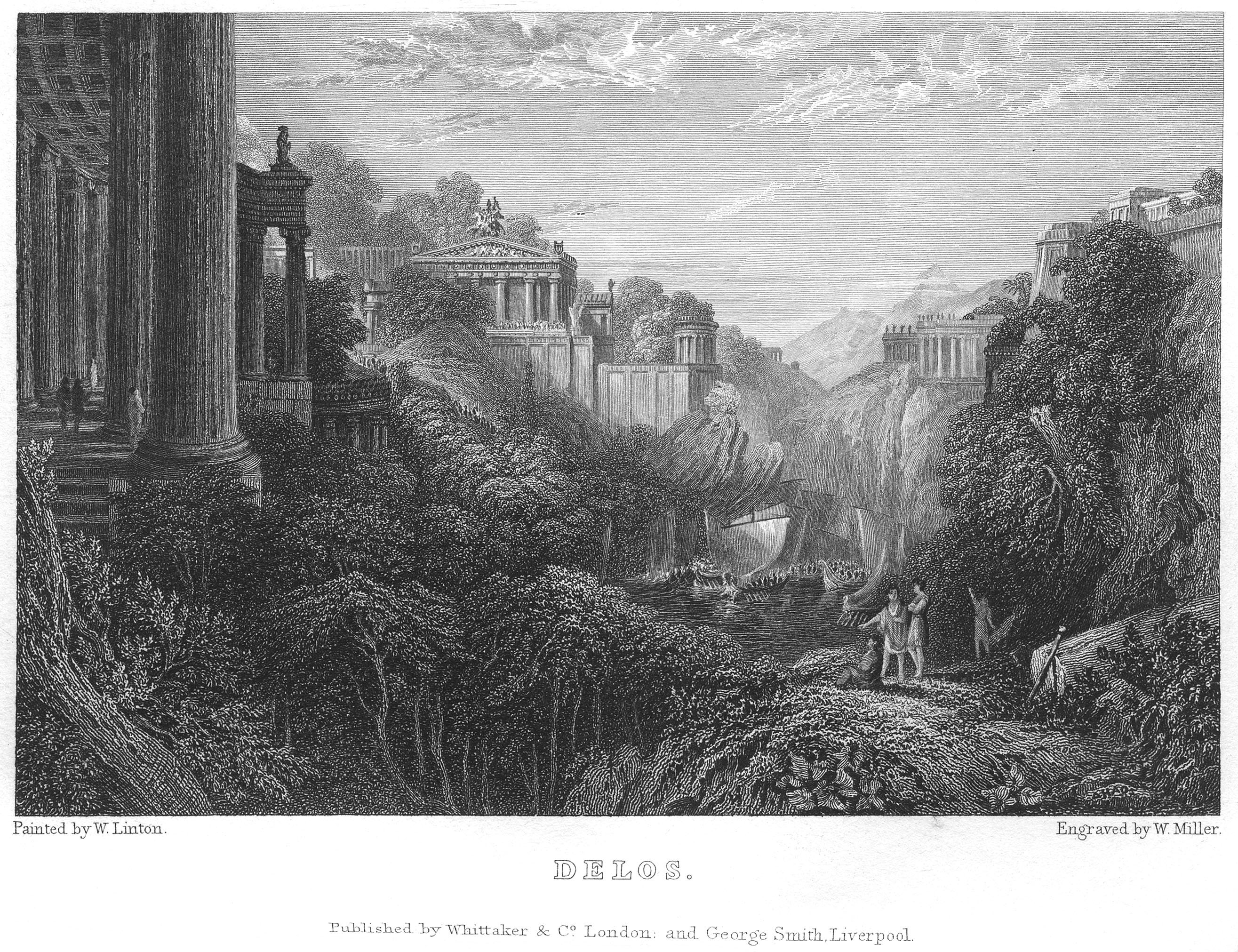
W. Miller after W. Linton. Delos. 1831, from a drawing in the collection of Benjamin Hick

Linton's large-scale architectural phantasy 'Delos' (Wolverhampton Art Gallery) was engraved by William Miller in 1831.

The contemporaries praised Linton as "the new Richard Wilson". He was compared with his contemporary J. M. W. Turner.

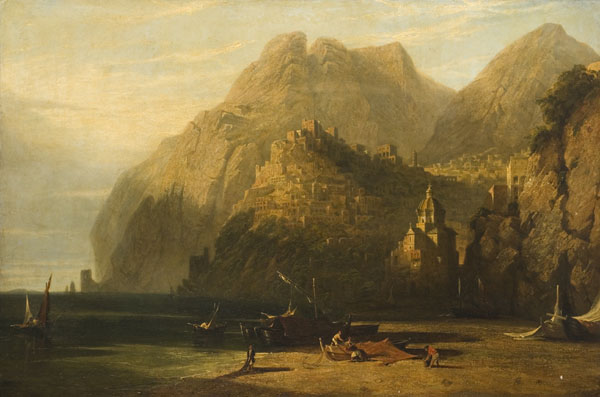
Positano, Gulf of Salerno. 1840s

The reviewer of the 1851 exhibition at the Royal Academy wrote about Linton's 'View of Venice':

The real aspect of Venice itself and of the Grand Canal has never been more faithfully rendered, even by Canaletti (sic!), than by Mr W.Linton. We admire the breadth, repose, and sobriety of the tone which are so favourable to architectural effect in his pictures, and Mr Linton never resorts to those artifices of light by which so many modern artists attempt to throw a strained and unnatural interest over their compositions.

Linton had wealthy patrons, and his large-scale painting 'Positano, Gulf of Salerno' (Wolverhampton Art Gallery) was commissioned by the Earl of Ellesmere.

At the same time, Linton also presented himself as a man-of-letters: in 1832, he published a book ‘Sketches in Italy: being a selection from upwards of five hundred of the most striking and picturesque scenes in various parts of Piedmont: the Milanese, Venetian, and Roman States; Tuscany; and the Kingdom of Naples; sketched during a tour in the years 1828-1829.’(London, 1832). In the same year, he also published Scenery of Greece and its Islands, illustrated by fifty engravings and collaborated with celebrated children writer Mrs Barbara Hofland (1770–1844) on the book ‘Poetical illustrations of the various scenes represented in Mr. Linton's "Sketches in Italy". He was a talented chemist and published in 1852 the Ancient and Modern Colours, from the Earliest Periods to the Present Time, with their Chemical and Artistical Properties.

In 1831, he married Julia Adelina Swettenham (1806–1867), a niece to the Countess of Winterton. They settled down in Marylebone, London, where in the 1840s he opened a Gallery at 7, Lodge Place, London.

From the 1860s, he started to sell his works through Christie’s. Large sales of his collection were held at the Christie's in 1860, and again after his retirement in 1865. William Linton died in December 1876.

His paintings can be found at the Tate Britain, Fitzwilliam Museum, Warrington Museum & Art Gallery, Wolverhampton Art Gallery, and some other collections. The British art historian Colonel M.H. Grant said of Linton: “We know of few painters whose life’s work, if collected together into one Gallery, would make a more splendid appearance than this”.

== Published works ==
- Sketches in Italy: being a selection from upwards of five hundred of the most striking and picturesque scenes in various parts of Piedmont: the Milanese, Venetian, and Roman States; Tuscany; and the Kingdom of Naples; sketched during a tour in the years 1828-1829. 1832.
- Scenery of Greece and its Islands, illustrated by fifty engravings. 1832.
- Barbara Hofland and William Linton. Poetical illustrations of the various scenes represented in Mr. Linton's "Sketches in Italy". 1832.
- Ancient and Modern Colours, from the Earliest Periods to the Present Time, with their Chemical and Artistical Properties. 1852.
- A table of colours for oil painting, with notices of their chemical and artistical properties. London, privately printed. 1859.
- Colossal Vestiges of the Older Nations. 1862.
- Records of Several of Mr. Linton's Works, which have appeared in the London Exhibitions in the course of half a Century; with the opinions of the Public Journals. Also a Biography, with Press Notices of The Scenery of Greece, and Ancient and Modern Colours. 1872.

== Literature ==
- The Art Journal, January 1858.
- The Art Journal, August 1876.
- George H Shepherd. A Short History of the British School of Painting.1891.
- Colonel M.H. Grant. A Dictionary of British Landscape Painters. 1970.
- Christopher Wood. Victorian Painters.1995.
- E Benezit. Dictionnaire des Peintres, Sculpteurs, Dessinateurs et Craveurs. Tome 5.
- JGP Delaney. William Linton. Oxford DNB.
