= Henry Ashworth (nonconformist) =

English cotton manufacturer and activist (1794–1880)

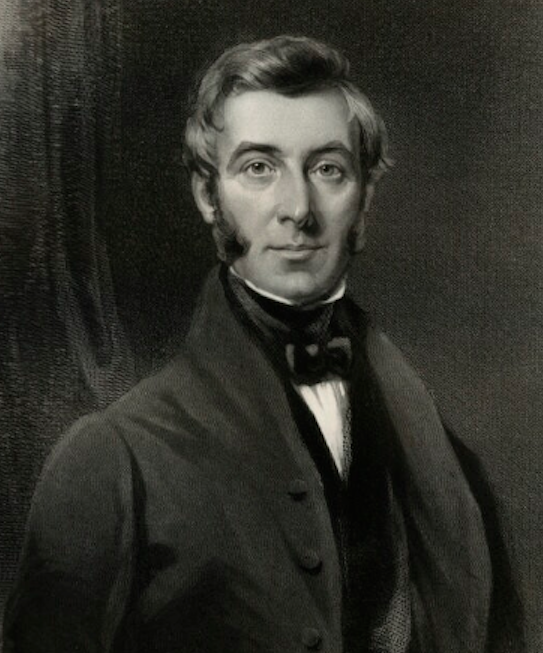
- Mezzotint of a portrait by Charles Allen Duval
- Born: 4 September 1794; Birtenshaw, England, Great Britain
- Died: 17 May 1880 (aged 85); Florence, Kingdom of Italy
- Occupation: Cotton manufacturer
- Known for: Nonconformist movement Anti-Corn Law League; Quaker
- Political party: Liberal
- Spouse: Letitia Binns

Henry Ashworth (4 September 1794 – 17 May 1880) was an English cotton manufacturer, friend of Richard Cobden, and founding member of the Anti-Corn Law League.

== Early life and education ==
Henry Ashworth was born on 4 September 1794 into a prominent Quaker farming family in Birtenshaw, then an outlying hamlet to the north of Bolton, Lancashire. His father was John Ashworth, who supplemented his income by buying cotton and selling it to local cottage weavers.

He was sent to Ackworth School run by the Society of Friends.

== Career ==
In 1808, he became involved at the New Eagley mill, taking over its management in 1818. He was joined by his younger brother Edmund in 1821. Under the partnership of the two brothers, the business expanded, and by 1831, they had 260 employees. In 1832 they bought the partially completed Egerton Mill which had been built upstream at Egerton.

They established schools, a library, and a reading room. Ashworth was a staunch nonconformist, and thus refused to pay church rates. Ashworth supported the schemes of Edwin Chadwick to implement the Poor Law of 1834, but was a tough opponent of trades unions. In a dispute with Edmund, the business was split in 1854, with Henry taking the New Eagley Mill and Edmund the Egerton Mill. By this time, the sons of both brothers had taken over much of the management responsibility. In 1880, Henry Ashworth retired, handing over New Eagley to his eldest son, George Binns Ashworth.

=== Anti-Corn Law ===
Ashworth was a founder of the Anti-Corn Law League and was one of its major supporters. He had met Richard Cobden in 1837 and reportedly became a close friend.

In 1840, he was one of a deputation that waited upon Lord Melbourne to urge the repeal of the corn laws.

In 1843, in company with John Bright and Cobden, Ashworth visited County Durham, Northumberland, Cumberland, and East Lothian, to survey agriculture—they were sometimes mentioned as the ABC of the League. At the large meeting held in Manchester on 23 December 1845, Ashworth proposed that £250,000 should be raised for the purpose of the agitation. The corn laws were repealed, and the final meeting of the League was held in the Manchester Town Hall on 2 July 1846. Ashworth defended Cobden at the meeting held in Manchester after the incident in the House of Commons, when Peel charged the leader of the League with connivance at assassination. He also assisted Cobden in the negotiation of the Cobden–Chevalier Treaty.

== Personal life ==
Ashworth married Letitia Binns of Liverpool and with her had 11 children, 6 sons and 5 daughters. Of his sons, George Binns, John, and Henry were involved in the New Eagley business; two others died in childhood.

== Later life ==
Throughout his life, Ashworth was an advocate of peace, retrenchment, and reform. He also enjoyed shooting. He made several continental tours and, in February 1880, left his house, The Oaks, Turton, to winter in Italy, as he had usually done for some years. Whilst travelling from Rome, he became ill and at Florence was bedridden with Roman fever. After about two weeks of illness, he died in Florence on 17 May 1880 and was buried in the Protestant cemetery there.

== Works ==
Ashworth's major work is Recollections of Richard Cobden and the Anti-Corn Law League (two editions, London 1876 and 1881), written with John Watts. He also wrote:

- Statistical Illustrations of Lancaster, 1842.
- A Tour in the United States and Canada, 1861.
- An account of the Preston strike of 1853–1854; and some pamphlets.

== See also ==
- List of mills in Bolton
- Benjamin Hick
- John Hick
