= 1853–1854 Preston strike =

Strike by English weavers in Lancashire

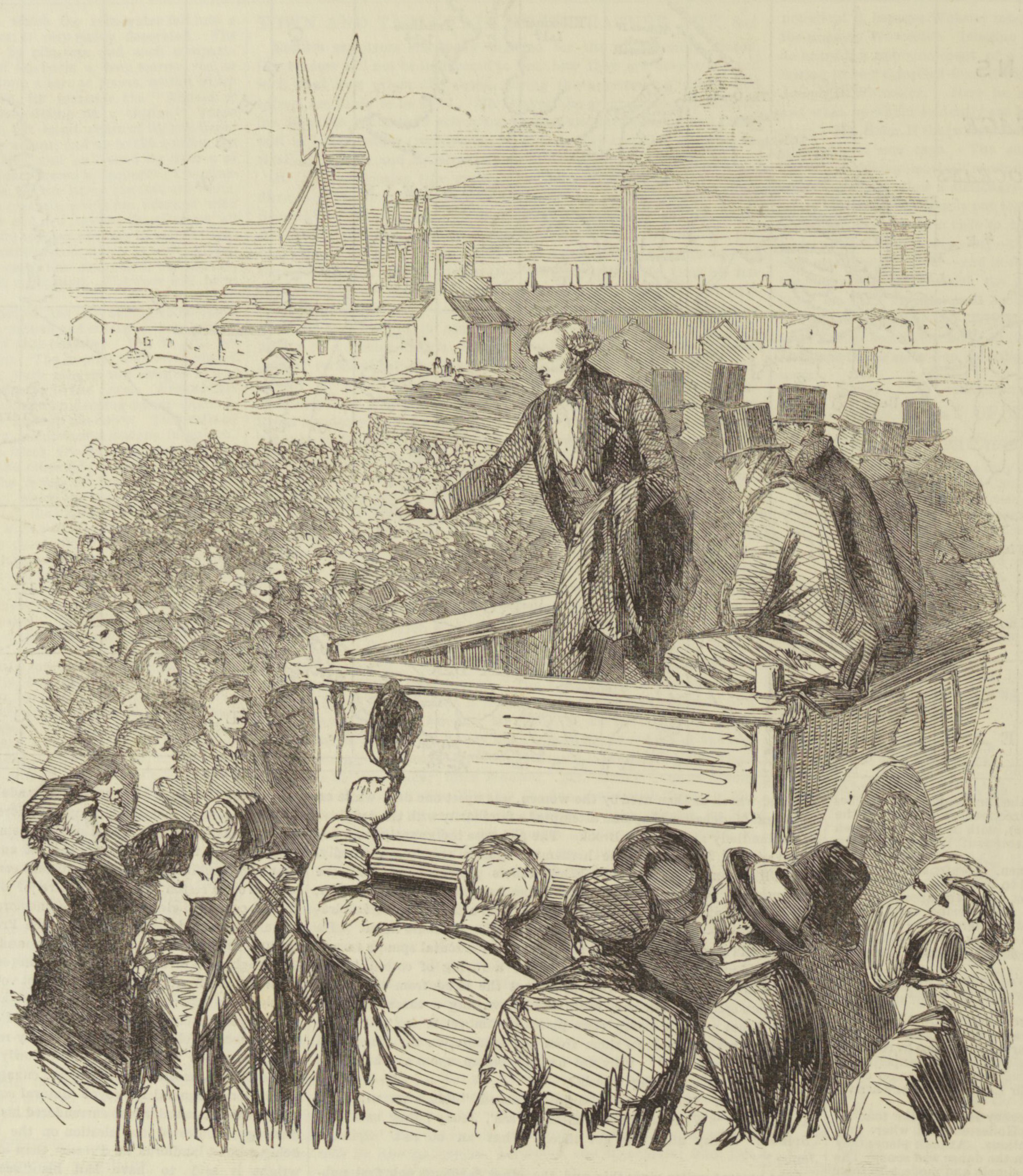
- George Cowell speaking to the gathered strikers in Preston
- Date: August 22, 1853—May 1, 1854
- Location: Preston, Lancashire
- Goals: 10% increase in wages, and a city-wide wage equalization
- Methods: Strike action
- Result: Strike ended due to the successful employment of strikebreakers

Parties
| Association of Preston weavers | Preston factory owners |

Lead figures
| George Cowell; Edward Swinglehurst; Mortimer Grimshaw | |

The Preston strike of 1853–1854 was a strike by English weavers which took place between 1853 and 1854 in Preston, Lancashire, United Kingdom.

The strike lasted seven months and paralysed the cotton industry in the city of Preston. The primary leaders were George Cowell and Mortimer Grimshaw.

It inspired two contemporary novelists. Charles Dickens spent several days in Preston in January 1854. Although he does not describe a strike in Hard Times, whose publication began in April 1854 in Household Words, he was inspired by Mortimer Grimshaw to create the character of the union leader, Slackbridge; the intransigence of the bosses inspired the character of Bounderby. Elizabeth Gaskell, in North and South, was inspired by the Preston strike to depict one that takes place in Manchester.

== Background ==
in 1854, Preston was a hub for cotton manufacturing, employing an estimated 17,000 workers. The economy of the United Kingdom had recently been in recession, leading some mills to close or dramatically reduce production, impacting Preston weavers. Later policy changes in the UK promoted an increase in trade, which helped to stabilize the economic conditions of the country.

From 1852 to 1853, there was a high level of discontent among English workers concerning wages. This discontentment spread to many industries, leading to workers striking for higher wages. Among them were agricultural workers, whose strike actions grew more common, particularly near manufacturing towns.

There was a strong sense of solidarity between the weavers of Preston, manifesting in weavers working together to resist disciplinary action against their colleagues. Henry Ashworth, an English cotton manufacturer, argued that for masters, the Preston strike was ultimately about the right of capital owners to dictate work conditions.

Preston weavers alleged that workers in Blackburn, Lancashire earned wages 10% higher than them. A 10% reduction in wages had previously occurred in 1847 when trade in the region suffered, and workers argued that recent economic improvements entitled them to a return to pre-1847 wages. Edward Swinglehurst, a Preston labour leader, was quoted at the second public meeting of the association of Preston weavers, saying:

The war-cry had gone the round of the manufacturing districts, and now it was come to the citadel of corruption, Preston, which had the finger of scorn pointed at it, as being the subject of the lowest rate of wages, and being the last to assert its right to the ten per cent advance.

In addition to a 10% raise in wages, Preston weavers sought an equalization of wages, such that workers at any factory working the same job may receive the same wage.

On August 22, 1853, Preston spinners and mule minders met at Temperance Hall to discuss the prospect of a strike if the factory owners refused their demands, to which they agreed unanimously. Around the end of August, the Masters' Association of factory owners in Preston met to discuss the demands of the workers and decided they would resist them. Ultimately, the Preston weavers decided to go on strike.

The specific economic demands of the Preston strike were motivated by the failure of the Chartist movement to provoke revolutionary change after the 1842 general strike was crushed. George Cowell, a Preston weaver and labour leader, said that despite his support of Chartism, he was not prepared to incorporate the movement into the Preston strike out of concern that it would detract from their more specific economic demands.

=== Significant figures ===
Within the leadership of the strikers, there was an overlap of interest between several contemporary movements, including the Ten Hours Movement, Chartism, factory reform and short time committees.

George Cowell was the leader of the Preston strike and spent most of his time involved throughout its duration. Cowell was born in a nearby community in Lancashire and moved to Preston in the late 1830s. He worked as a weaver for textile companies Horrockses and later Messrs Napier & Goodair in the summer of 1853, where he intended to return after the strike concluded. Cowell was also a Methodist and teetotaller. Before the Preston strike, he was also involved in the Chartist and 10 Hours movements. He was accused by Preston factory owners of being a professional agitator.

== Timeline ==
Tensions continued to rise over the course of the strike. The weavers held daily rallies in a vacant space outside of Preston called "the Orchard" where workers discussed injustices they faced at the hands of the factory owners. Delegates from around the country joined to give speeches sympathizing with the weavers of Preston.

The strike attracted significant attention and was covered by national newspapers. The national attention gave labour leaders in Preston a stronger conviction to refuse to make concessions on their core demand. Workers in Lancashire considered wages in Preston to be "miserably low" at the time which motivated solidarity between towns in the region. Prior to the strike, workers of neighbouring towns saw the Prestonian weavers as "docile and cowardly" for their willingness to accept lower wages than elsewhere, and as such impeding the effort to improve wages generally. The strike in Preston was seen as an extension of efforts to increase wages in their own communities.

At the end of October, 1853, factories began to close, rendering an estimated 17,000 workers unemployed. Workers faced mounting challenges due to an economic downturn in Preston and the United Kingdom's ongoing war efforts, but remained optimistic and retained their conviction to not concede on the 10% raise. Ashworth argued that this clear focus on the 10% raise as a core demand was what made the strike so successful in uniting workers.

=== Attempts at mediation ===
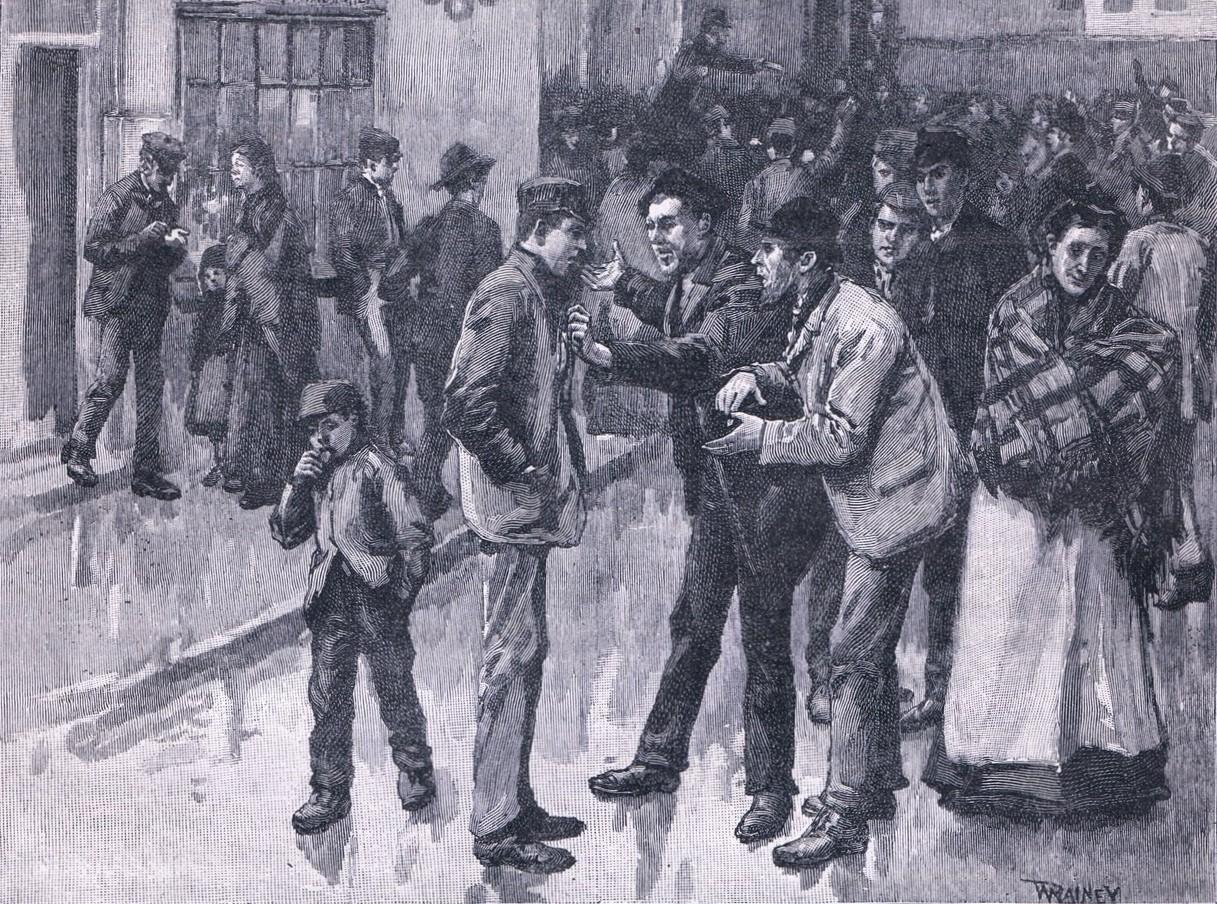
Scene during the Preston Strike, by William Rainey

Arbitration was considered as early as the beginning of the strike. One Preston labour leader, speaking at a rally at the Orchard, recommended inviting factory owners to meet with the striking weavers, however, no such meeting materialized.

In October 1853, there was a concerted effort by the middle-class people of Preston and the clergy to attempt to bring the striking workers together with the factory owners to reconcile their disagreements. However, the factory owners declined to participate, believing it would not be in their best interests.

In early December 1853, striking weavers sought to have Lord Palmerston interfere in the strike. Replying several weeks later, Lord Palmerston refused to interfere, suggesting that the strikers should accept the best terms the factory owners were willing to offer. Before the strikers sought the intervention, a group of workers invaded a Blackburn hotel where factory owners were staying, suspecting they were visiting Blackburn in search of strikebreakers, threatening to run them out of town. Following these threats, the factory owners appealed to Lord Palmerston for help, who sent the UK military to prevent similar disturbances. This difference in the government's response between the appeals of the workers and factory owners became the subject of further discontent among Preston labour leaders.

The Royal Society of Arts attempted to provide a platform for discussion between representatives of the factory owners and striking weavers by organizing a conference on January 24, 1854. Representatives planned to discuss the morality of trade unions, strikes and lockouts, the feasibility and rationale of equitable pay, and whether workers deserve to share in the increased productivity of machinery.

Attendance at the conference was high, particularly among workers who represented many different professions. The conference was also attended by a number of progressives. The conference "unanimously affirmed" that changing the law to accommodate workers was desirable, however, factory owners and British politicians rejected the outcome of the conference, arguing it was one-sided due to the vast majority of attendees being workers.

=== Strikebreaking efforts ===
Mills that continued to operate during the Preston strike did so using strikebreakers from other districts.

Striking weavers attempted to prevent strikebreakers from arriving in Preston by protesting at train stations, however, strikebreakers had police escorts to facilitate their journey to the local factories. In response to this, Preston labour leadership sent delegates around the country to attempt to dissuade workers from coming to Preston as strikebreakers. In one instance, a number of Irish immigrant strikebreakers were talked into returning to Ireland before arriving in Preston after a delegate talked them out of it. Several of the delegates were arrested for conspiracy, which further angered Preston strikers.

By April 1854, factory owners of the Masters' Association had 7000 people in their employment between them, and by late April they were receiving more applications for employment than they were able to accept.

=== Decline ===
Factory owners in Stockport had previously given weavers the 10% raise that Preston's strikers sought. When they later decided to withdraw the raise, 10,000 workers decided to go on strike a week later. Subsequently, financial contributions to the Preston strike from Stockport stopped as people refocused their resources locally. More broadly, the Stockport strike drew attention away from Preston strikers, whose monthly contributions would steadily decrease from then on.

== Outcome ==
On May 1, 1854, the executive committee of the association of Preston weavers circulated an address declaring the end of the strike. The committee identified several reasons for the strike's failure, including the cooperation between factory owners, the successful employment of strikebreakers in Preston and the ongoing war. The committee noted that workers should wait for another opportunity to demand the 10% raise.

Preston's weavers ultimately returned to work, however, thousands of workers were left without jobs. Those who did return to work earned less than they were paid before the strike started.

== See also ==
- Preston Strike of 1842
