= Henry Liverseege =

English painter (1802–1832)

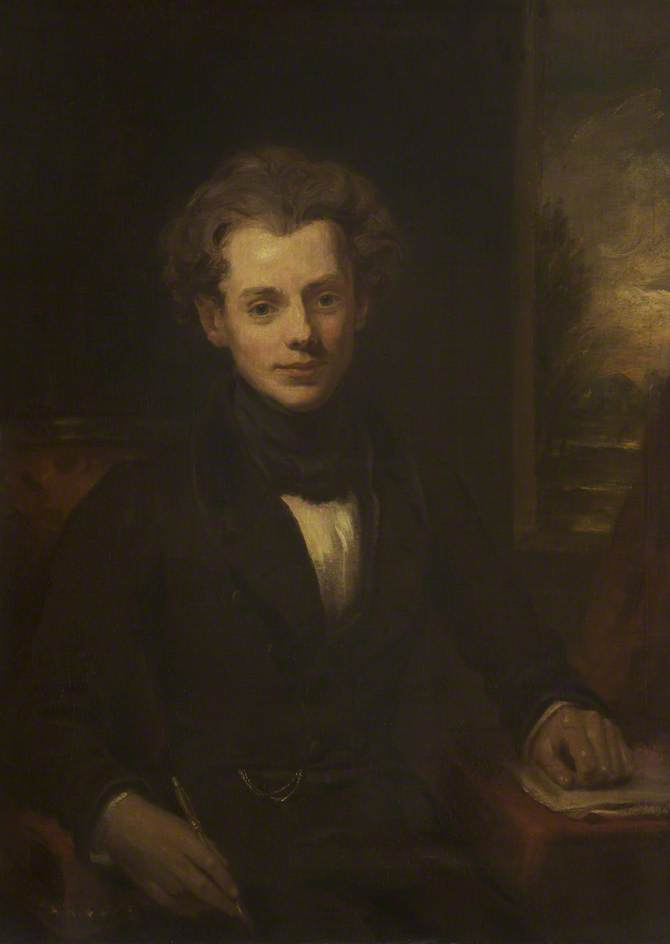
- by William Bradley
- Born: 4 September 1802; Manchester
- Died: 13 January 1832 (aged 29)
- Occupation: Genre painter

Henry Liverseege (4 September 1802 – 13 January 1832) was an English genre painter of literary and folklore subjects.

== Life and work ==
=== Early years ===
Henry Liverseege was born in Manchester, the son of Edmund Liverseege, a joiner. He was a weakly child who suffered from asthma and following his death in 1832 it was discovered that one of his lungs had failed to develop. He also had a spinal deformity which caused his left shoulder to be noticeably lower than the right. Even when in his twenties, he was reported to weigh as little as 70-75 lbs. Perhaps as a consequence of his infirmities, his father rejected him and he was brought up by his uncle John Green, a Manchester cotton mill owner. He was educated in a small Manchester school but did not progress to university. He showed an early interest in the arts, became involved in amateur theatricals for a while and demonstrated a talent for drawing.

=== Early career ===
The financially comfortable circumstances of Liverseege's uncle, allowed him to pursue a career as an artist and his earliest work was painting portraits for commissions at around five guineas each. He had no formal artistic training and contemporary critics described his portraits as 'indifferent'. Three of his portraits have survived, the sitters being Thomas Whalley, one of his patrons, William Wood, a Unitarian minister (after an original by George Keith Ralphs, and Mrs. Elizabeth Calvert, the mother of his close friend and fellow artist Michael Pease Calvert. He also painted a number of inn signs for Manchester hotels. This work also brought only modest remuneration.

=== Later career ===
Around 1826, Liverseege graduated from painting inn signs and portraits to specialising in genre paintings based on characters and scenes from literature and folklore. His first genre paintings were exhibited at the exhibition of the Royal Manchester Institution in 1827. These were three small works 'Banditti Attacking Travellers', 'Banditti Carousing' and 'A Robber on the Outlook'. These sold, but only for small prices. He was more successful that same year with his painting of 'Adam Woodcock' from Walter Scott's The Abbot which was purchased by Thomas Egerton, 2nd Earl of Wilton, of Heaton Hall.

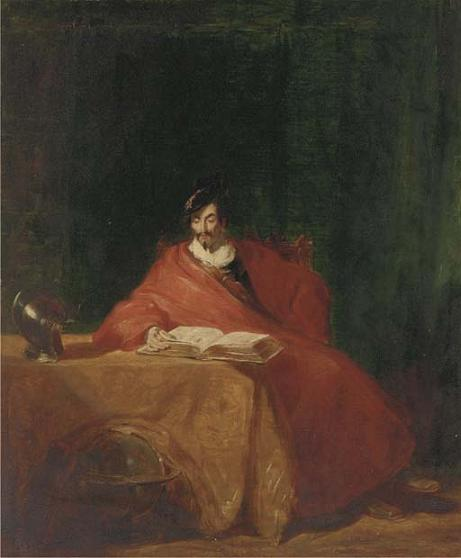
The Scholar (1831, oil on canvas)

He now made a number of visits to London where he sketched from works in the Royal Academy and the British Museum. He also attended some classes at a London art school. He applied to enter the Royal Academy as a student but was rejected on the technicality that he had failed to submit the required character references. While in London, he became acquainted with William Etty and with Sir Thomas Lawrence, the artist whose work he regarded as the finest. It was Lawrence who provided his letter of introduction to the Royal Academy.

Despite their rejection of his application to study, he nevertheless exhibited at the Royal Academy in 1831 and one of his oil paintings, 'Sir Piercie Shafton and Mysie Happer', based upon characters from Walter Scott's 'The Monastery', was purchased by William Cavendish, 6th Duke of Devonshire. The painting has remained in the Devonshire Collection to the present day.

=== Death ===
Liverseege's career was now beginning to take off and his work was selling well for decent prices. His health, however, rapidly declined towards the end of 1831 and by the beginning of 1832 he realised that death was near.

In accordance with his dying wish, Liverseege's friend and patron Benjamin Hick saved many of the artist's sketches by mounting and placing them in a box that remained with the Hick family until 1909, before being sold at auction by Cape Dunne & Co. Manchester. Hick was the principal buyer of Leverseege's work including 'Agnes', 'The Betrothed', 'Falstaff and Bardolph', 'The Benediction', 'The Black Dwarf', 'The Fisherman', 'Friar Tuck', 'The Inquiry', 'Little Red Riding Hood', 'Lucy Ashton', 'The Orphan' and 'Captain Macheath'.

Liverseege died at the house of his (now widowed) aunt, Grace Green, on 13 January and was buried at St Luke's Church, Rutland Street, Chorlton-on-Medlock.

Thirty years after his death, when St. Luke's was rebuilt, a memorial was erected by a subscription raised by the editor of the Manchester Guardian. The church was demolished in the 1960s but the memorial was saved. He was the subject of several obituaries, some of which described him as 'The English Wilkie' comparing him with David Wilkie, the highly regarded Scottish painter. All recognised that had he lived, his talent would have brought him greater recognition.

== Paintings ==
Liverseege's output was substantial given his short career. Some 200 paintings, watercolours and drawings can be identified, but the present location of around half of these is unknown. The largest collection of his works, 37 sketches, watercolours and oils, is held by the Whitworth Art Gallery in Manchester. Manchester Art Gallery also holds several of his paintings as well as the memorial stone which was erected in (the now demolished) St. Luke's Church. Works can also be found in Tate Britain and the National Army Museum. Shortly after his death a folio edition of engravings made from his paintings was published. This was published in a second edition in 1875.

== Sources ==
- Allan Cunningham. The Lives of the Most Eminent British Painters, Sculptors and Architects, volume 6 pp. 297–312 (London, J. Murray, 1830).
- Gentleman's Magazine April 1832, p281;
- The Annual biography and obituary, volume 17 pp. 52–61.
- Richard Wright Procter. Memorials of Manchester Streets pp. 151–162 (Manchester, T. Sutcliffe, 1874).
- Espinasse, Francis. Lancashire Worthies pp. 340–9 (London : Simpkin, Marshall & Co, 1877).

== Bibliography ==
- Engravings from the Works of Henry Liverseege (Hodgson, Boys and Graves, 1835).
