= Philip Francis Stephanoff =

English painter

Philip Francis Stephanoff, sometimes Francis Philip Stephanoff (1787/88–1860) was an English painter.

== Life ==
He was born in Brompton Row, London. His father, Fileter N. Stephanoff, was a Russian who settled in England and worked painting ceilings and stage scenery, until he committed suicide around 1790; his mother Gertrude Stephanoff (died 7 January 1808) was a flower-painter with Sir Joseph Banks as patron. James Stephanoff (1788?–1874), also an artist, was his elder brother.

Stephanoff became a popular painter of historical and domestic subjects, working both in oils and watercolours. He exhibited at the Royal Academy and British Institution from 1807 to 1845, and with the Old Watercolour Society from 1815 to 1820.

His wife, Selina Roland, died suddenly. Stephanoff ceased to work as artist many years before his own death, which occurred at West Hanham, near Bristol, on 15 May 1860.

== Works ==
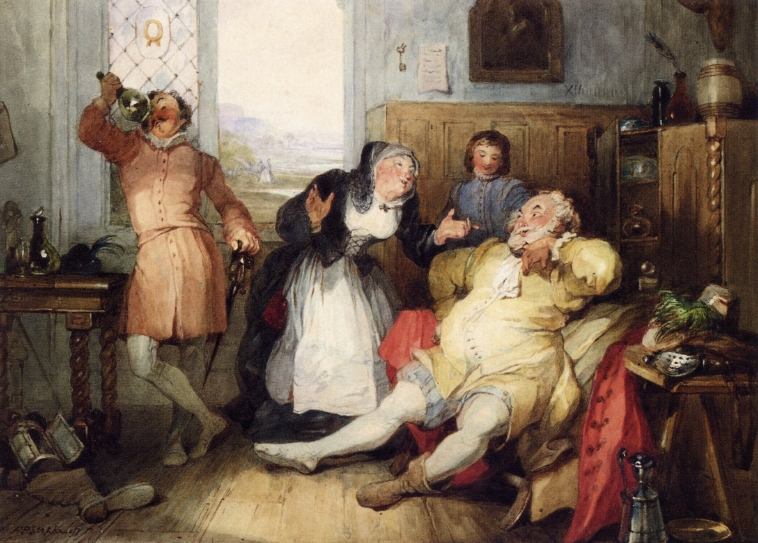
Falstaff and Mistress Quickly by Philip Francis Stephanoff

Stephanoff's works The Trial of Algernon Sidney, Cranmer revoking his Recantation, Poor Relations, and The Reconciliation were engraved; he also furnished designs for The Keepsake and other annuals. For Sir George Nayler's sumptuous work on the coronation of George IV he drew in watercolours a series of costume portraits, which went to the South Kensington Museum. At the Westminster Hall competition in 1843 Stephanoff gained a prize of £100 for a scene from John Milton's Comus.
