= Executorial trustee =

Someone appointed to be an executor

An executorial trustee is someone who is appointed to be an executor (the person who carries out the directions set forth in a will) and also be a trustee of a testamentary trust created by the will.

== See also ==
- trust law
- inheritance
- executor
- trustee
