= William Bradley (painter) =

English painter (1801–1857)

William Bradley (1801–1857) was an English portrait artist.

== Biography ==
Bradley was born in Manchester, England. He was left an orphan when only three years of age. He started life as an errand boy, but his taste for drawing prevailed and at sixteen years of age he began practice as an artist. He took portraits at one shilling each and advertising himself as "portrait, miniature, and animal painter, and teacher of drawing". He had a few lessons himself from Mather Brown, then in high repute at Manchester; and at the age of twenty-one went to London, where he was fortunate enough to obtain an introduction to Sir Thomas Lawrence, who gave him encouragement.

After remaining some years in the metropolis, in the course of which time he paid occasional visits to Manchester, he finally, in 1847, settled down in the latter town; where, as in London, he enjoyed a large share of patronage. Amongst the portraits painted by him are those of Lords Beresford, Sandon, Denbigh, Bagot, and Ellesmere; Sir E. Kerrison, John Gladstone, B. Heywood, James Emerson Tennent; Col. Currieton, C.B., Col. Anderton, the Rt. Hon. W. E. Gladstone, Sheridan Knowles, W. C. Macready. As an artist Bradley undoubtedly possessed high talent. His heads are remarkable for skillful drawing, and he was not second to any man of the day in producing a striking and intellectual likeness. During his later years his health failed, his mind was affected, and he lost the money he had made in his early career. He died in 1857.

Two of his oil painting portraits and a number of prints of his work are in the collection of the National Portrait Gallery, London.

Selected works

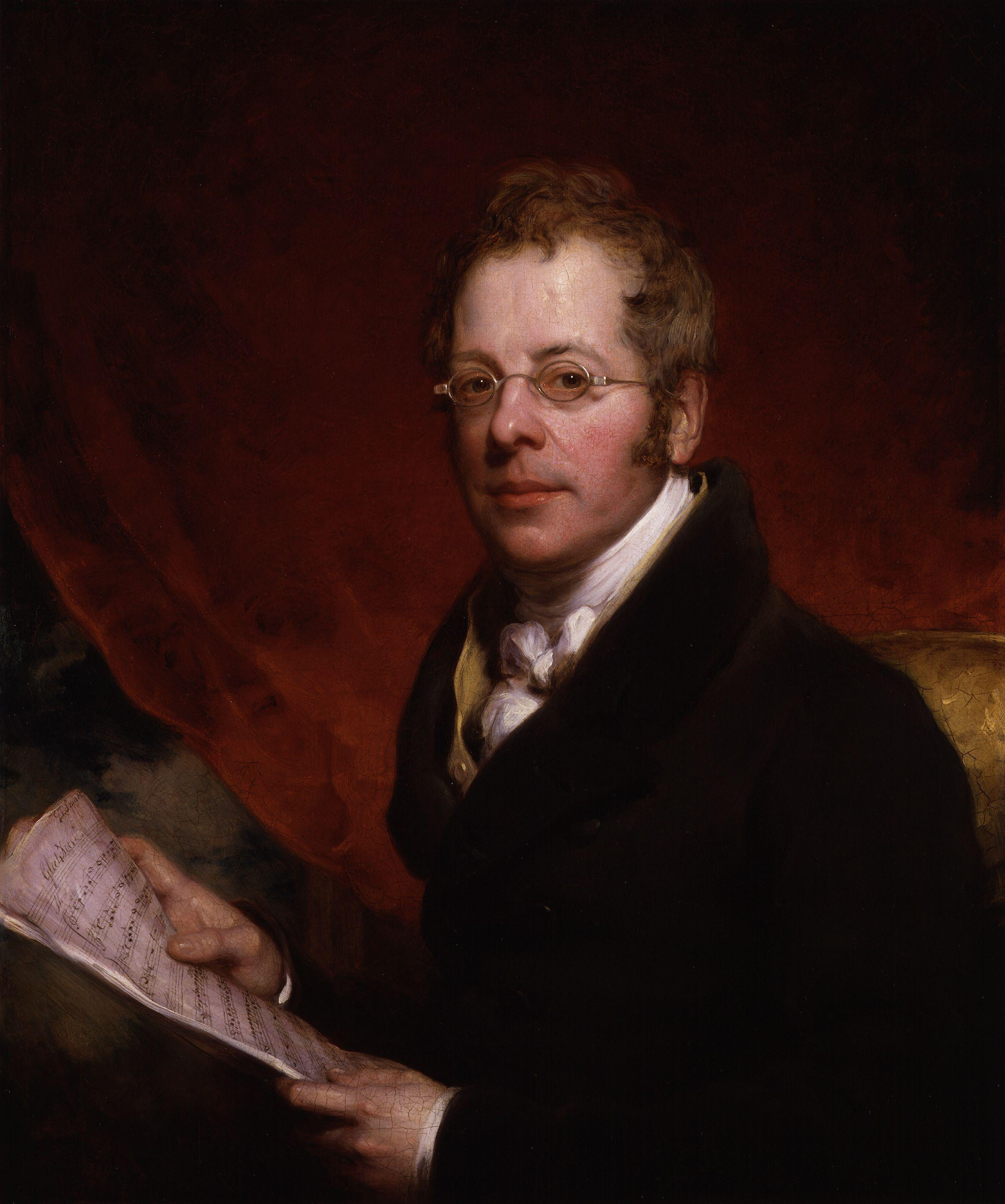
Sir George Thomas Smart

Sir Robert Seppings

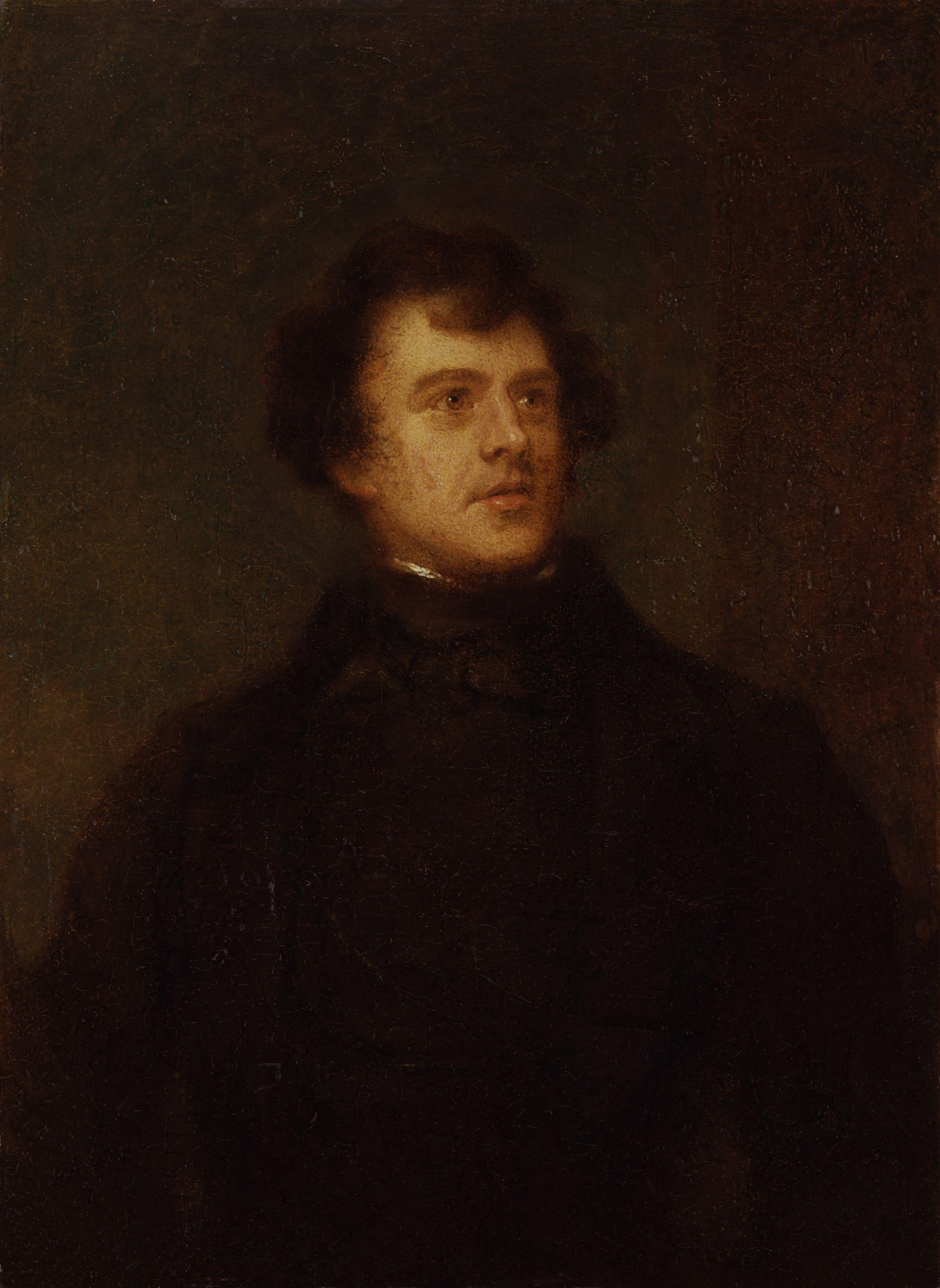
Charles Swain
