= 1841 in art =

Events from the year 1841 in art.

== Events ==
- May 3 – The Royal Academy Exhibition of 1841 opens in London
- June 1 – Scottish painter and engraver Sir David Wilkie, returning to Britain from a voyage to the East, dies on board a ship out of Gibraltar and is buried at sea in the Bay of Gibraltar, an event commemorated in J. M. W. Turner's painting Peace - Burial at Sea (1842).
- Fourth plinth, Trafalgar Square, London erected to the design of Charles Barry. The planned equestrian statue of King William IV being abandoned due to lack of funds, the plinth remains empty until 1999.
- George Hayter appointed Principal Painter in Ordinary to Queen Victoria.
- American artist John G. Rand invents the collapsible zinc oil paint tube, marketed by Winsor & Newton of London.
- Salon of 1841 in Paris

== Publications ==
- Edward Lear – Views in Rome and its Environs (lithographs).
- John Ruskin – The King of the Golden River, with illustrations by Richard Doyle.

== Works ==
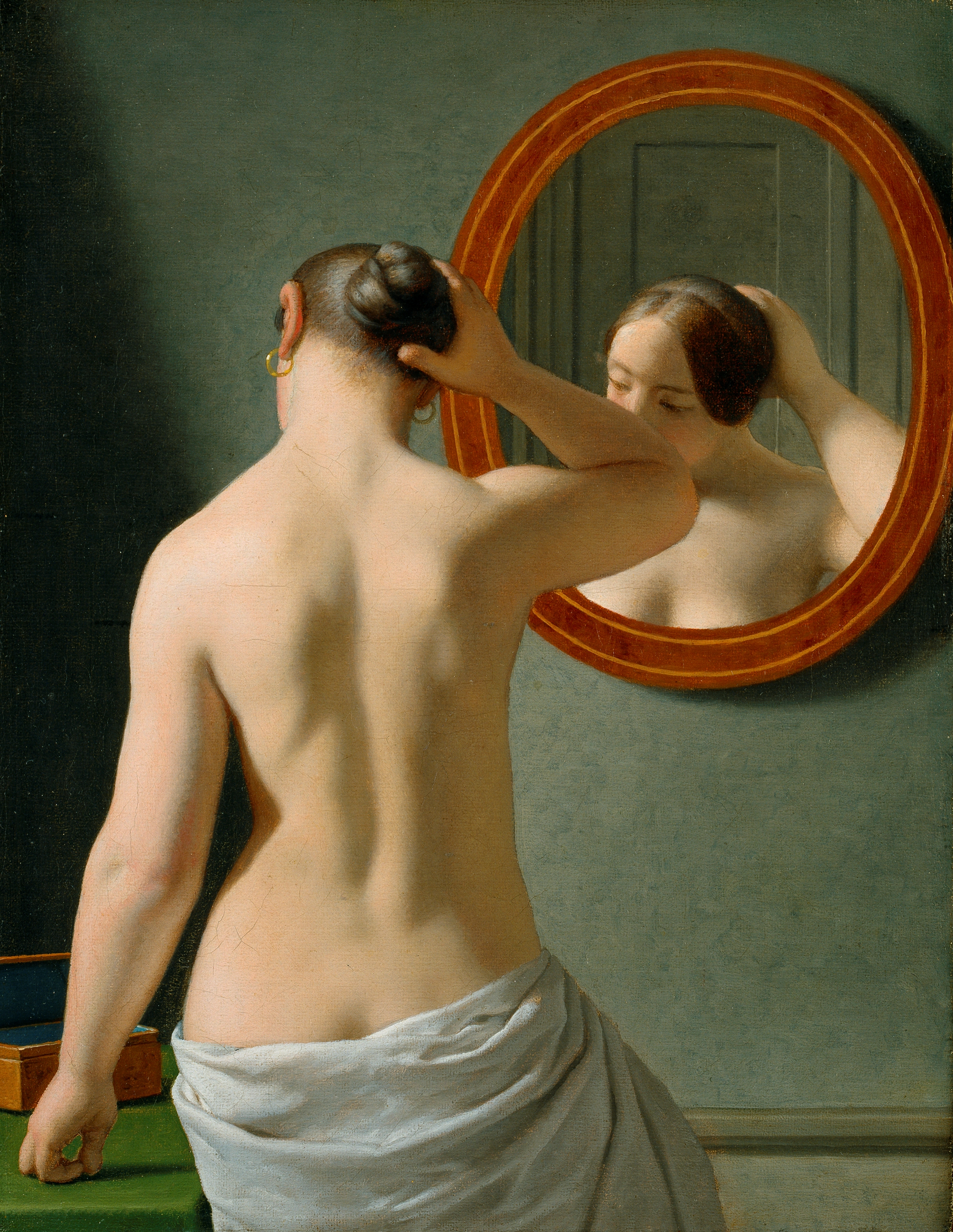
Eckersberg – A Nude Woman Doing Her Hair Before a Mirror

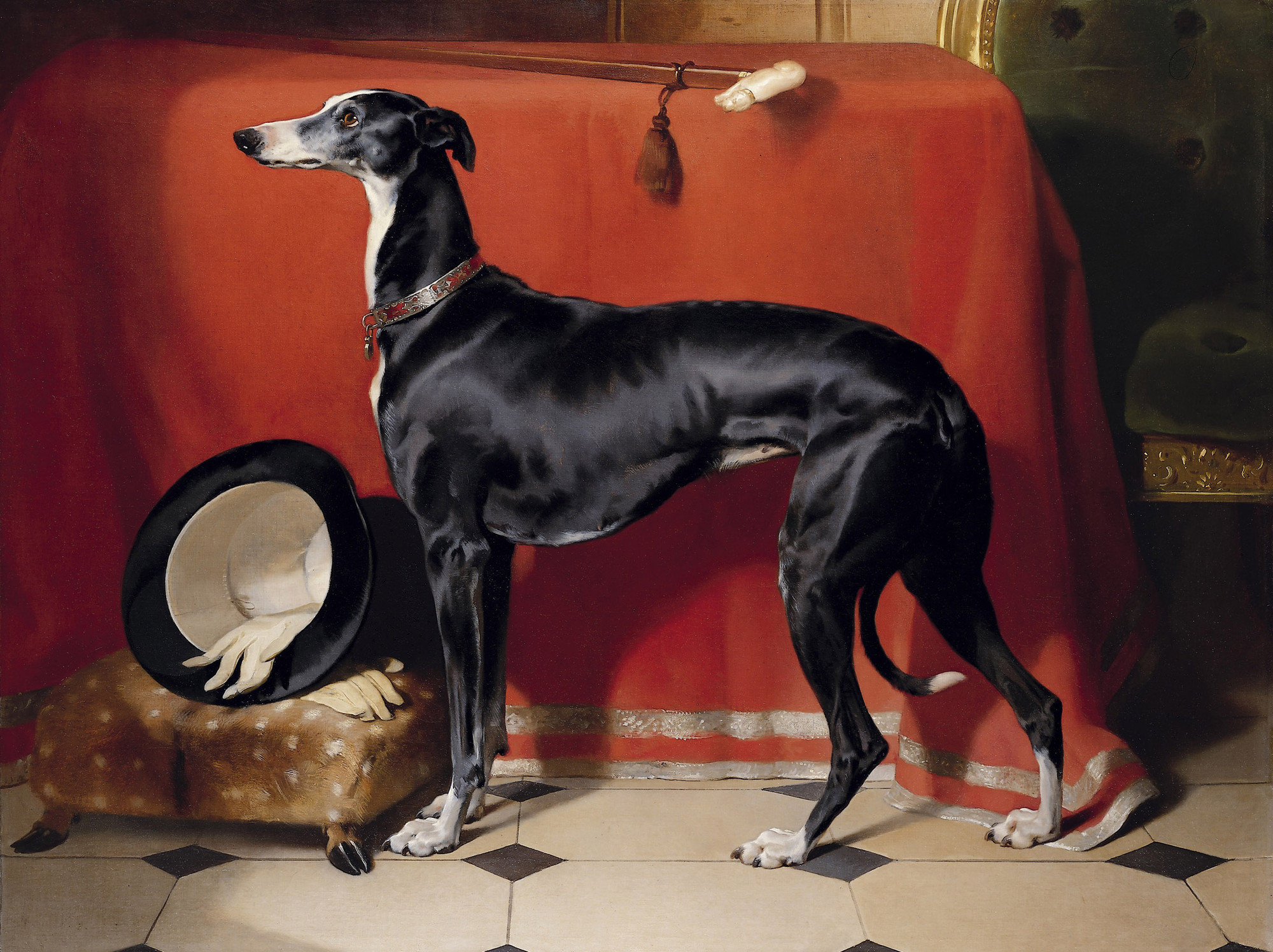
A Favourite Greyhound of Prince Albert by Edwin Landseer

- Amazone zu Pferde (Kiss), Berlin
- Thomas Birch – An American Ship in Distress
- Théodore Chassériau – The Toilette of Esther or Esther Preparing to be Presented to King Ahasuerus
- Thomas Cole – The Fountain of Vaucluse
- Auguste Couder – Muhammad Ali, Viceroy of Egypt
- Francis Danby – The Enchanted Castle
- Hippolyte Delaroche – Hémicycle in École des Beaux-Arts, Paris.
- Christoffer Wilhelm Eckersberg – A Nude Woman Doing Her Hair Before a Mirror
- William Etty
  - Female Bathers Surprised by a Swan
  - The Repentant Prodigal's Return to His Father
- Richard Evans – Portrait of George Bradshaw
- Benjamin Robert Haydon – The Anti-Slavery Society Convention, 1840
- Francesco Hayez – Portrait of Alessandro Manzoni
- Charles Landseer – The Temptation of Andrew Marvell
- Edwin Landseer – A Favourite Greyhound of Prince Albert
- Emanuel Leutze –Christopher Columbus Before the Council of Salamanca
- Daniel Maclise – The Sleeping Beauty
- John Martin
  - The Celestial City and the River of Bliss
  - Pandemonium
- Henri Félix Emmanuel Philippoteaux – The Defence of Mazagran
- David Roberts
  - The Fountain on the Prado, Madrid
  - The Gateway to the Great Temple at Baalbec
  - Pilgrims Approaching Jerusalem
  - The Temple of Dendera
  - A View of Toledo and the River Tagus
- William Salter – The Waterloo Banquet
- Clarkson Stanfield – The Castle of Ischia from the Mole, Italy
- J.M. W. Turner
  - The Ducal Palace, Dogana and Part of San Giorgio
  - Glaucus and Scylla
  - Schloss Rosenau
- Edward Matthew Ward – Napoleon in the Prison of Nice in 1794
- Thomas Webster – The Boy with Many Friends
- Antoine Wiertz – La Chute des Anges rebelles
- David Wilkie – Portrait of Muhammad Ali of Egypt
- Franz Xaver Winterhalter
  - Portrait of Louis Philippe I
  - Portrait of Louise of Orléans

== Births ==
- January 14 – Berthe Morisot, Impressionist painter (died 1895)
- February 4 – Charles Édouard Delort, French academic painter (died 1895)
- February 16 – Armand Guillaumin, Impressionist painter (died 1927)
- February 25 – Pierre-Auguste Renoir, Impressionist painter (died 1919)
- September 4 – Albert Joseph Moore, painter (died 1893)
- December 6 – Frédéric Bazille, Impressionist painter (died 1870)

== Deaths ==
- January 7 – James Arthur O'Connor, Irish landscape painter (born 1792)
- January 12 – Alexander Day, English miniature painter and art dealer (born 1772)
- February 14 – Jean-Pierre Casimir de Marcassus, Baron de Puymaurin, French chemist, medallist, politician, and man of letters (born 1757)
- April 10 – Henri Van Assche, Belgian painter (born 1774)
- June 1 – David Wilkie, Scottish painter (born 1785)
- July 27 (O.S. July 15) – Mikhail Lermontov, Russian poet and painter (born 1814) (in a duel)
- August 15 – Elizabeth Gould, illustrator (born 1804)
- September 2 – Francesco Rosaspina, Italian engraver (born 1762)
- October 9 – Karl Friedrich Schinkel, architect and painter (born 1781)
- November 11 – Alexandre-Hyacinthe Dunouy, French painter known for his landscapes (born 1757)
- November 17 – Cladius Detlev Fritzsch, also known as C. D. Fritzsch, was a Danish flower painter (born 1765)
- November 23 – Watanabe Kazan, Japanese painter, scholar and statesman (born 1793)
- November 25 – Sir Francis Legatt Chantrey, sculptor (born 1781)
- date unknown – Gustaf Erik Hedman, Finnish painter (born 1777)
- probable – José Gil de Castro, Afro-Peruvian painter especially of portraits of Peru's heroes (born 1785)
