= Alexander Day (artist) =

British painter and art dealer (c. 1751–1841)

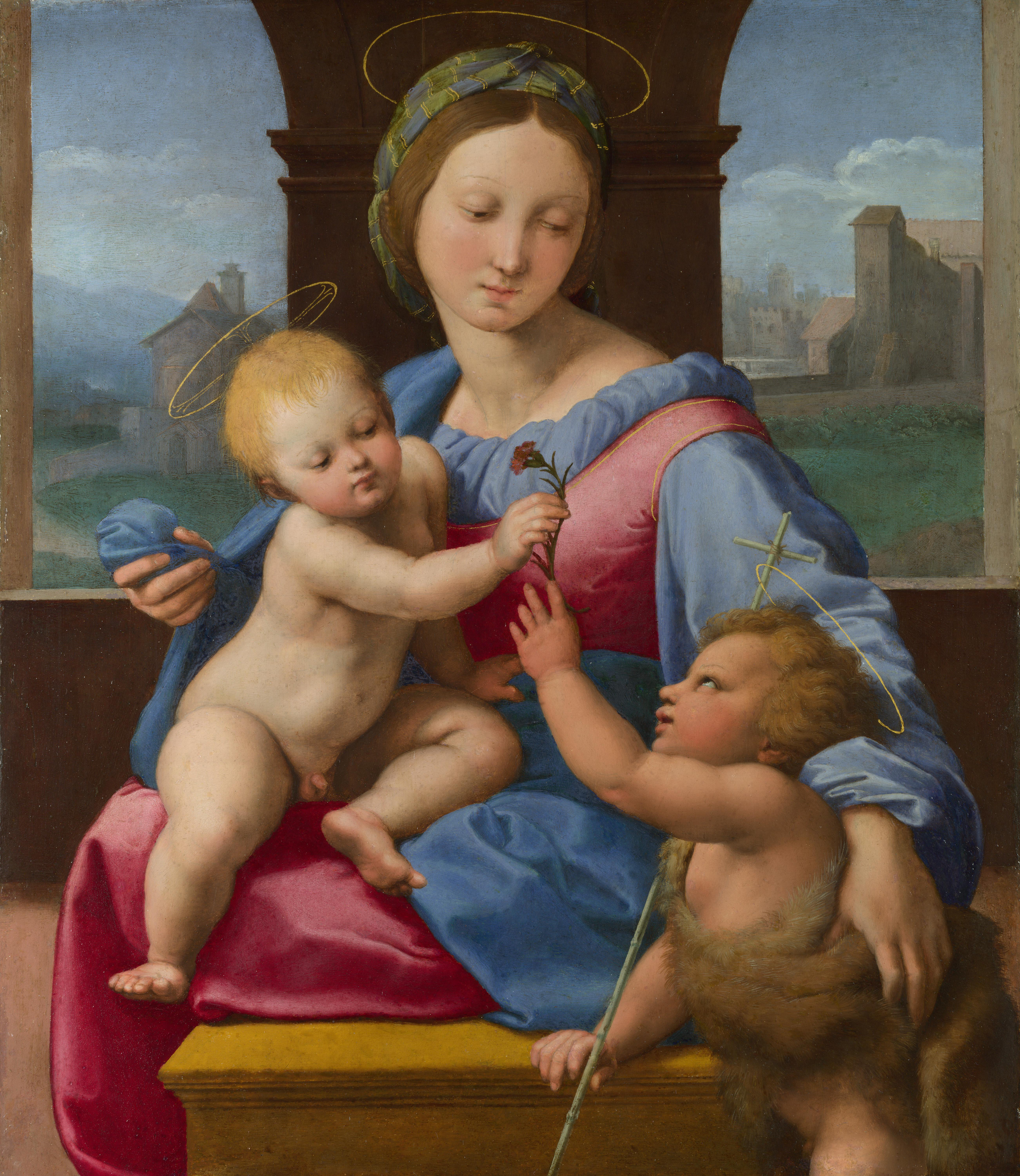
The Aldobrandini Madonna by Raphael, acquired by Alexander Day in Rome in 1800 or 1801, and sold by him to George Canning, 1st Baron Garvagh in 1818

Alexander Day (c. 1751 – 12 January 1841) was a miniature painter and art dealer. Born in Britain, he worked chiefly in Rome.

== Biography ==
Alexander Day was born c. 1751. He trained with the portrait-painter Ozias Humphry.

In 1774 Day travelled to Rome, where he would remain for some forty years, associating with other British and continental artists, such as James Nevay, Thomas Jones, Angelica Kauffman and Vincenzo Pacetti, and selling Old Master paintings and his own miniatures to British visitors, such as Frederick Augustus Hervey, Richard Worsley and Philip Yorke. He bought many paintings from the dealer Pietro Cammuccini and sold them on to British collectors.

In 1800 Day returned to Britain, where he exhibited many works by old masters, which were sold into the collections of John Julius Angerstein and others. He returned to Italy in 1802, and in that year sent more paintings and contemporary sculpture to London for sale.

In 1815 Day returned to Britain permanently. He shared a house with the gem-engraver Nathaniel Marchant. When Marchant died in 1816, Day married Marchant's housekeeper, to whom Marchant had left £9,000.

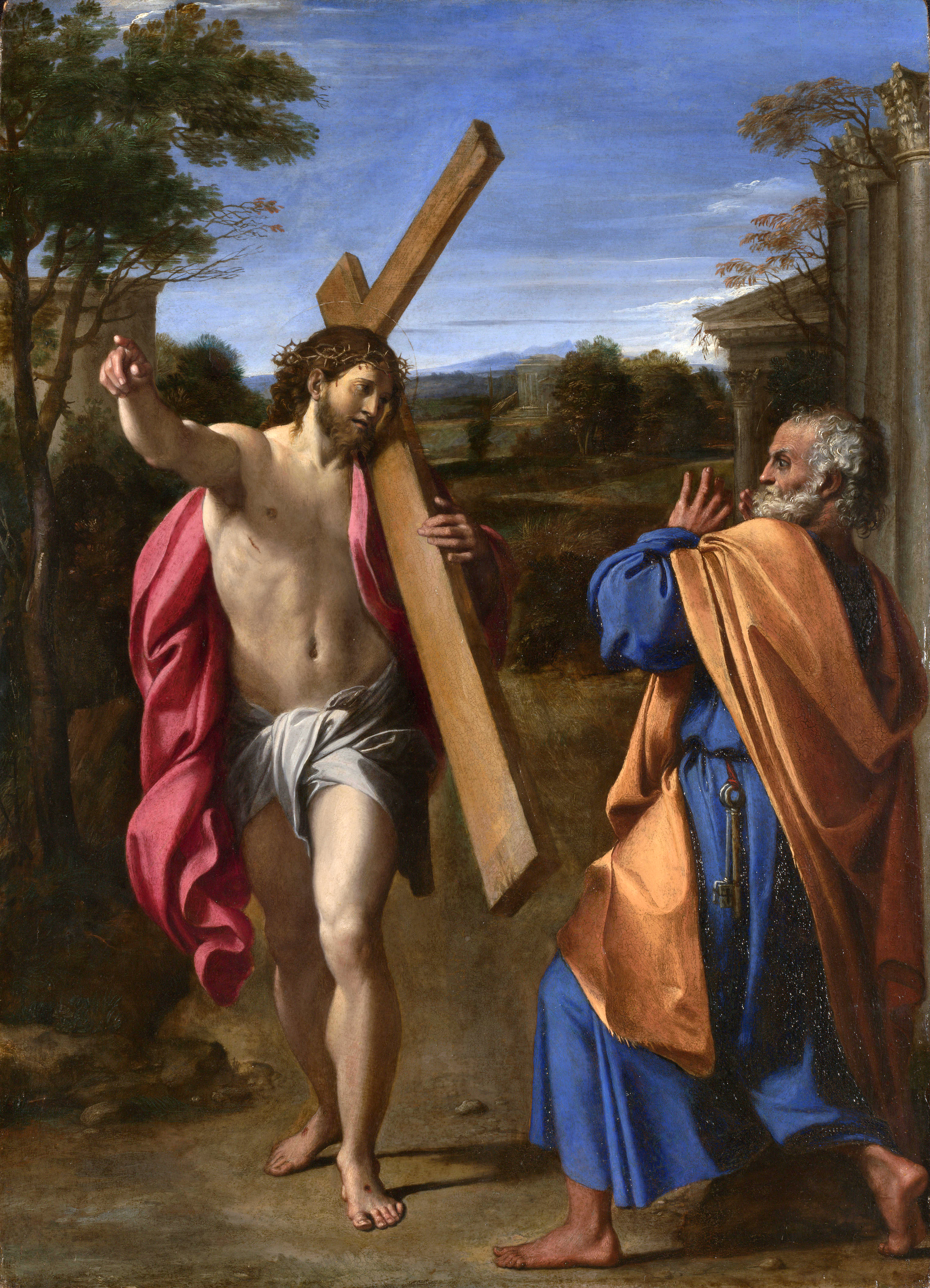
Annibale Carracci, Domine, quo vadis?, acquired by Day in Rome in 1800

Among the paintings sold by Day were Titian's Rape of Ganymede and Venus and Adonis, Raphael's St. Catherine and the Madonna, Infant Christ, and St. John (the Garvagh Madonna), Leonardo da Vinci's Christ disputing with the Doctors, Domenichino's St. Jerome and the Angel, Annibale Carracci's Christ appearing to Simon Peter after his Resurrection, and Gaspard Poussin's Landscape with Abraham and Isaac, which are now in the National Gallery. His portrait miniatures of ladies are particularly graceful.

Day purchased from the Borghese collection Annibale Carracci's Temptation of St Anthony, and, in 1792 Andrea Mantegna's Adoration of the Shepherds, which William Buchanan sold to Richard Payne Knight at Downton Castle.

Day died in Chelsea, London, on 12 January 1841.

An anonymous pencil portrait of Alexander Day may be seen at the National Portrait Gallery, London.
