= Pandæmonium (Paradise Lost) =

Fictional location from Paradise Lost

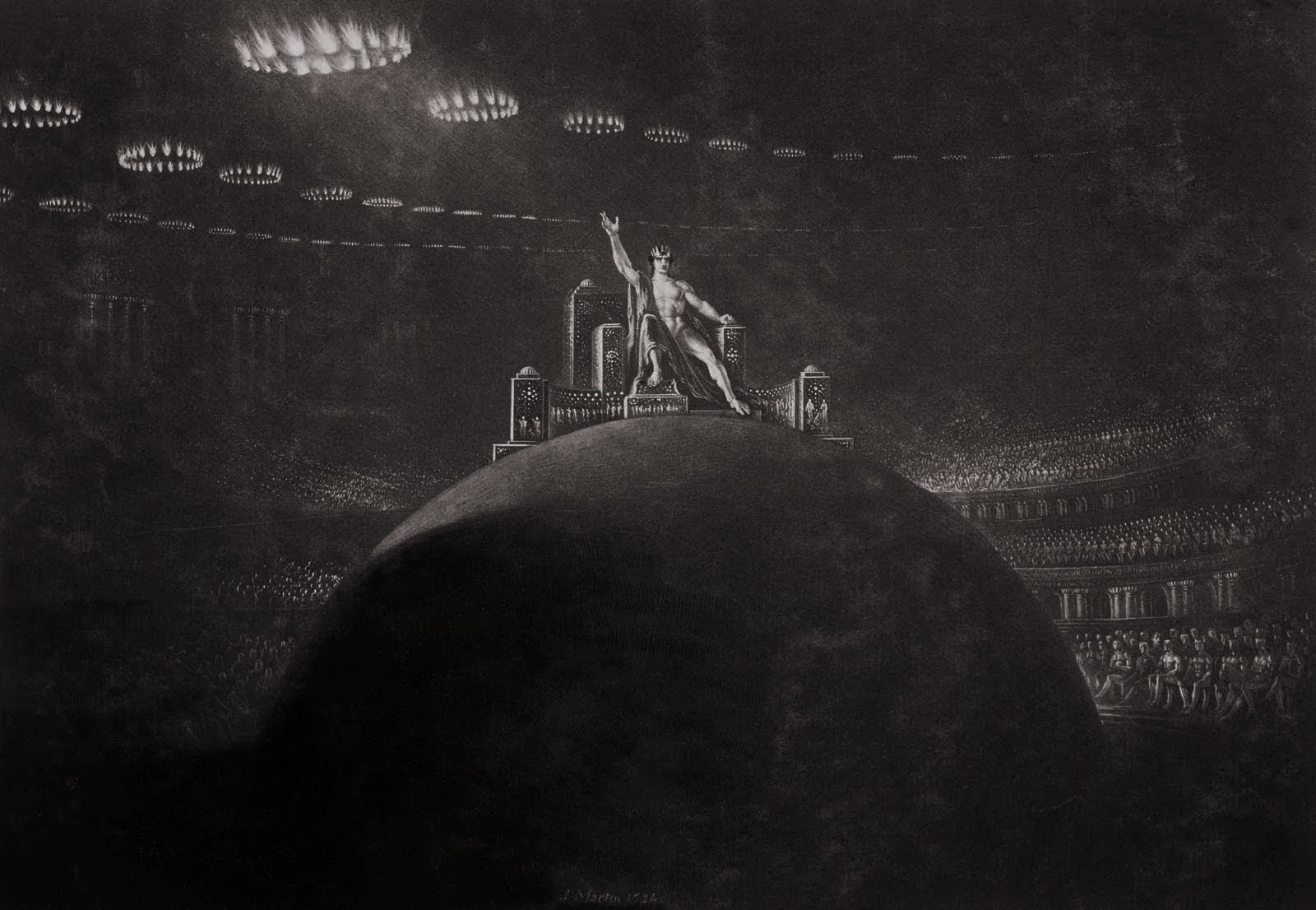
John Martin, Satan Presiding at the Infernal Council, c. 1823–1827

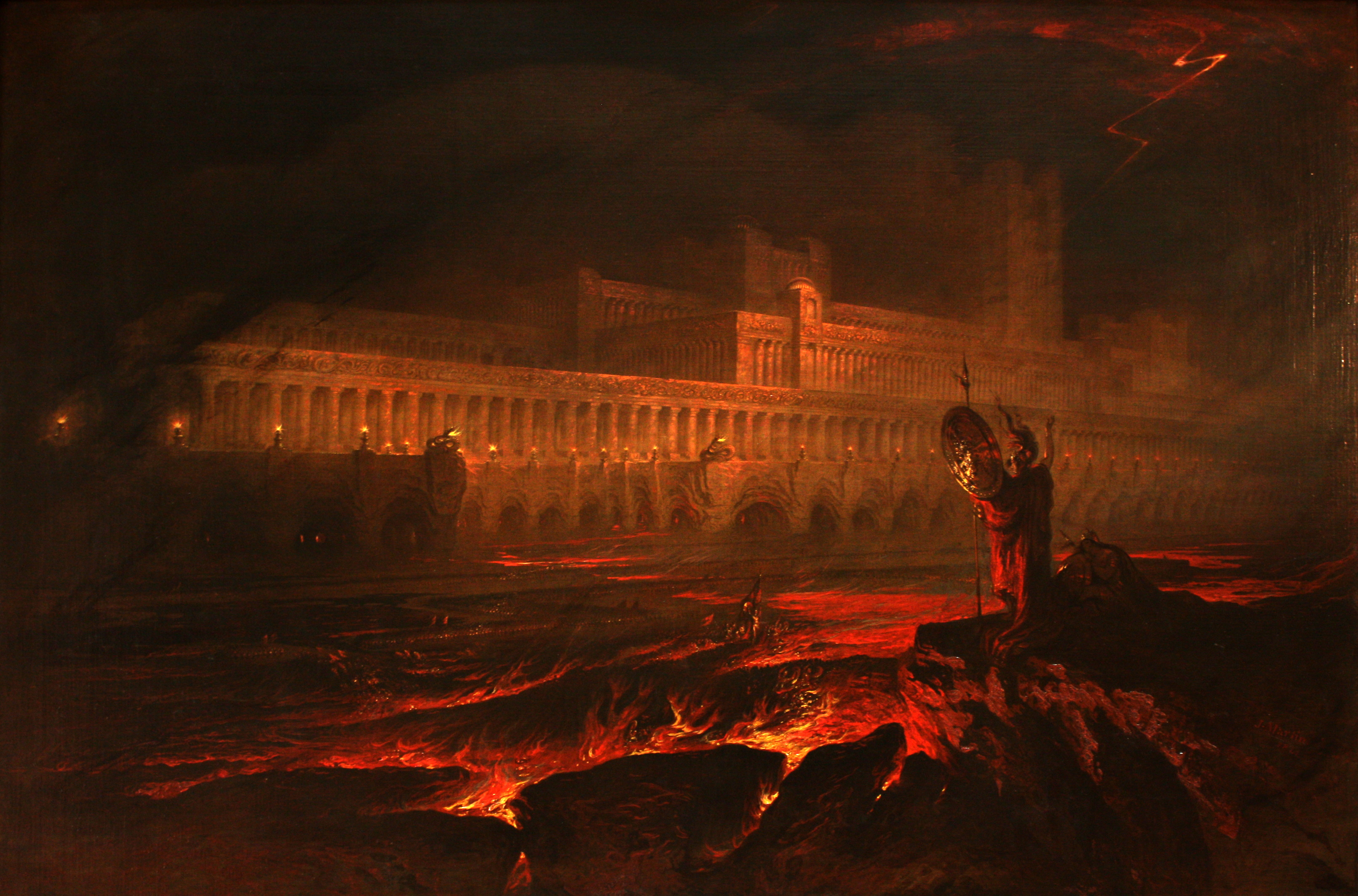
John Martin, Pandemonium, 1841

Pandæmonium (or Pandemonium in some English orthographies) is the capital of Hell in John Milton's epic poem Paradise Lost.

The name stems from the Greek πᾶν, meaning 'all' or 'every,' and δαιμόνιον, a diminutive form meaning 'little spirit,' 'little angel,' or, as Christians interpreted it, 'little daemon', and later, 'demon.' Pandæmonium thus roughly translates as "All Demons" –but can also be interpreted as Pandemoneion (Πανδαιμονεῖον), or 'all-demon-place'–.

John Milton invented the name in Paradise Lost (1667), as "A solemn Council forthwith to be held at Pandæmonium, the high Capitol, of Satan and his Peers" (1.754-756), which was built by the fallen angels at the suggestion of Mammon. It was designed by the architect Mulciber, who had been the designer of palaces in Heaven before his fall (In Roman times, Mulciber was another name for the Roman god Vulcan). Book II begins with the debate among the "Stygian Council" in the council-chamber of Pandæmonium. It is described as surpassing human achievements in architecture, greater even than the wonders found in Babylon or Egypt (1.717-718). The fallen angels are able to build in a few hours what would have taken human beings many ages (1.697-699). In Book 10, Satan returns to Hell and sits on the throne inside of Pandæmonium, where he witnesses the demons and himself transform into serpents (10.506-532).

== Architecture ==
It has been theorized that the architecture of Pandæmonium was inspired by Roman constructions. Rebecca W. Smith proposes that, because Milton had frequent opportunities in Italy to see Roman architecture and because his descriptions of Pandæmonium are consistent with the observations about Rome made by contemporary travelers, he must have been inspired by the vast architecture of the recently-finished St. Peter’s Basilica.

Other theories have also been proposed as to what civilizations inspired the architecture of Pandæmonium. Rodger Martin says that Milton's proximity to politics and his knowledge of the colonization of the Americas may have allowed him to take inspiration from the empires of South America, and that Tenochtitlan especially may have captured his interest as it had for other British colonizers.

== See also ==
- Dis
- Inferno
