= Garvagh Madonna =

Painting by Raphael

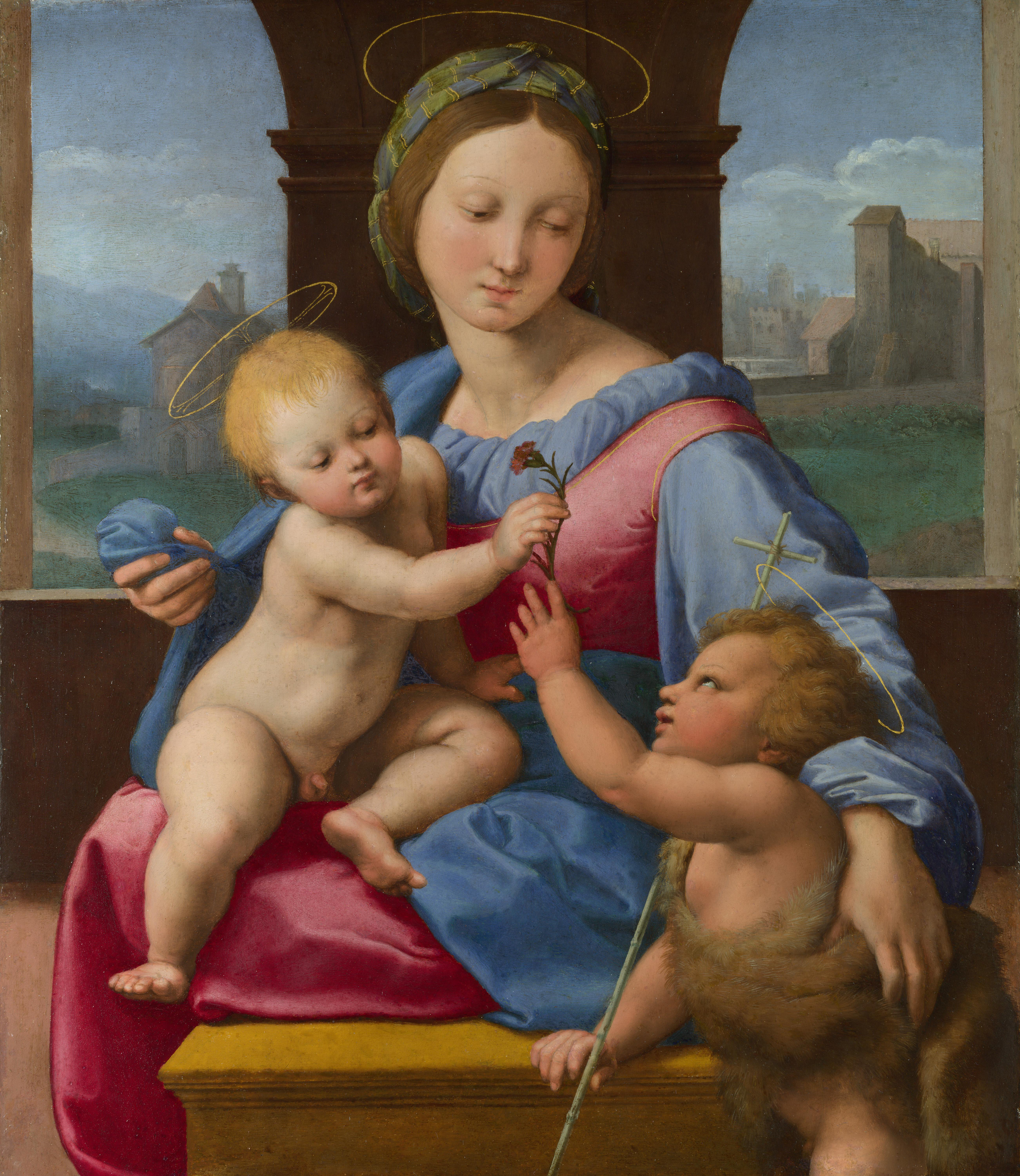
- Artist: Raphael
- Year: c. 1509–1510
- Type: Oil on wood panel
- Dimensions: 38.9 cm × 32.9 cm (15 1/4 in × 12 7/8 in)
- Location: National Gallery, London

The Garvagh Madonna (also known as the Aldobrandini Madonna) is an oil painting by the Italian Renaissance artist Raphael, dating to c. 1509–1510. It depicts the Virgin, the Christ Child and the infant John the Baptist, and is one of many paintings by Raphael with this trio. It is from early in the artist's third, or Roman period, in which distinctive changes are seen from his Umbrian or Florentine period in style and use of colour, with the introduction of more natural subjects and settings.

Owned for centuries by the aristocratic Roman Aldobrandini family, the painting has been in the collection of the National Gallery in London since 1865. It was sold to the National Gallery in 1865 after about five decades of ownership by Lord and Lady Garvagh.

== Description ==
One of several small and mid-size Madonnas painted by Raphael in Rome, the Garvagh Madonna is likely to have been something Raphael worked on in his spare time when he was engaged on projects for the Pope or members of his court. During this period, Raphael was painting the Stanza della Segnatura, the first room in the Vatican Palace to receive Raphael and his workshop's frescoes.

Exploratory sketches of this and other Madonnas from 1509 to 1511 are found in Raphael's "pink sketch-book". The Garvagh Madonna is one of several Madonnas by Raphael with a pyramidal composition.

The scene takes place within a room, with a backdrop of the Roman landscape through the windows. The dark pillar between the windows sets off the bright face of the Virgin, who is seated on a bench. The Christ Child sits naturally in the lap of the Virgin and is handed a carnation, a symbol of his future Passion, by Saint John. The painting has been highly regarded for its sweetness, grace, beauty and technical skill. Only the discreet ring haloes imply anything other than a very human scene. It has been observed that the drapery around the Virgin's lap does not seem to indicate sufficient room for her legs.

=== Relationship of the Christ Child and John the Baptist ===
Raphael appears to have a special affinity for the relationship between the infant Jesus and his similarly aged cousin John. This was probably due to the special relationship that they would enjoy as they went through adulthood. Raphael clothes the infant John here, and other paintings of the trio, in a little skin garment, like the cloths of the desert as described in the Bible, "camel's hair and with a girdle of skin about his loins".

=== Comparison to paintings from Raphael's Florentine period ===
Raphael's Madonnas from his early Roman years had evolved from those of his Umbrian and Florentine periods, and are more informal in dress and pose. At the same time, the composition is more complex. The colours are cooler, jewel-toned, an experiment with the dominant colours of the School of Athens, and bright, as if on porcelain.

The painting contrasts significantly with the Ansidei Madonna (1505) of Raphael's earlier Florentine period, influenced by the strict expression of divinity of the Umbrian School. Here the Virgin is a more human mother, with divinity only expressed through the halo. The Christ Child and Saint John are both children. The painting is more reflective of natural circumstances. And yet, there is a severity to this Madonna which will ease into a greater naturalness, such as in the Alba Madonna slightly later into the artist's Roman period.

In further contrast to the paintings of his Florentine period, the Madonnas of his Roman period are stronger and more imposing. This is due in part to the difference between the gaunt woman of Umbria and the beautiful women of Trastevere and Campagna, and also by Raphael's pursuit of the ideal. He instructed his students that "we must not represent things as they are, but as they should be".

A strong influence in Raphael's growth as an artist in Rome was Michelangelo. Aspects of the composition of the Garvagh Madonna are also similar to the Madonna Litta ascribed to Leonardo da Vinci, such as the portrait-format painting of figures in front of two windows overlooking the countryside, as well as the style of the Virgin's clothing.

The 19th-century art historian Ralph Nicholson Wornum wrote that Raphael, in the Garvagh Madonna and in other works of his Roman period, had "exhibited a nearer approximation to perfection than any other painter".

=== Other paintings by Raphael of the Virgin and Child with Saint John ===
There are several paintings by Raphael with the same trio:

- Ansidei Madonna (1505), National Gallery, London; depicts an adult John the Baptist with an infant Christ
- La belle jardinière (1507), Louvre, Paris
- Madonna with the Blue Diadem (c. 1510–1512), Louvre, Paris; with Gianfrancesco Penni
- Alba Madonna (1511), National Gallery of Art, Washington, D.C.
- Madonna della Seggiola (c. 1513–1514), Palazzo Pitti, Florence
- Madonna dell'Impannata (c. 1513–1514), Palazzo Pitti, Florence
- Madonna della Tenda (c. 1513–1514), Alte Pinakothek, Munich
- Madonna of the Rose (1518–1520), Museo del Prado, Madrid

== Provenance ==
In the 16th century the painting was owned by the Aldobrandini family, who owned apartments in the Villa Borghese in Rome. Raphael painted a number of Madonnas which passed into that family; this Virgin and Child with Saint John may have been in the collection of Lucrezia d'Este (d. 1598), inventoried in 1592, which came to the Aldobrandini. The National Gallery's painting is most likely identical to the painting in Jacomo Manilli's Villa Borghese guidebook in 1650 titled "Vergine, con Christo, e San Giouannino, ... di Raffaelle" ('Virgin, with Christ, and Saint John, ... by Raphael'). In the 1780s the art critic Basilius von Ramdohr noted that the painting was still kept in Prince Aldobrandini's apartments, verified by the National Gallery from Jean Baptiste Seroux d'Agincourt's illustrated publication of 1823, which includes a sketch of the painting and states that it can be seen at Prince Aldobrandini's apartment, and is notated in the margin:

"A most precious small painting of his middle period. The composition is very good. The Christ is beautiful, and the Saint John true, only the head of the Madonna compared with the others, is less beautiful. The disegno is most delicate. One notices from the colouring that the master had painted a lot al fresco at that time. The inks are not very much rubbed."

According to the National Gallery, and in contradiction to Seroux d'Agincourt, the painting was acquired by George Canning, 1st Lord Garvagh in 1818 from Alexander Day's collection before it was sold in 1865 to the National Gallery by his widow and heirs for £9,000.

== See also ==
- List of paintings by Raphael
