= Satan Presiding at the Infernal Council =

Engravings by John Martin

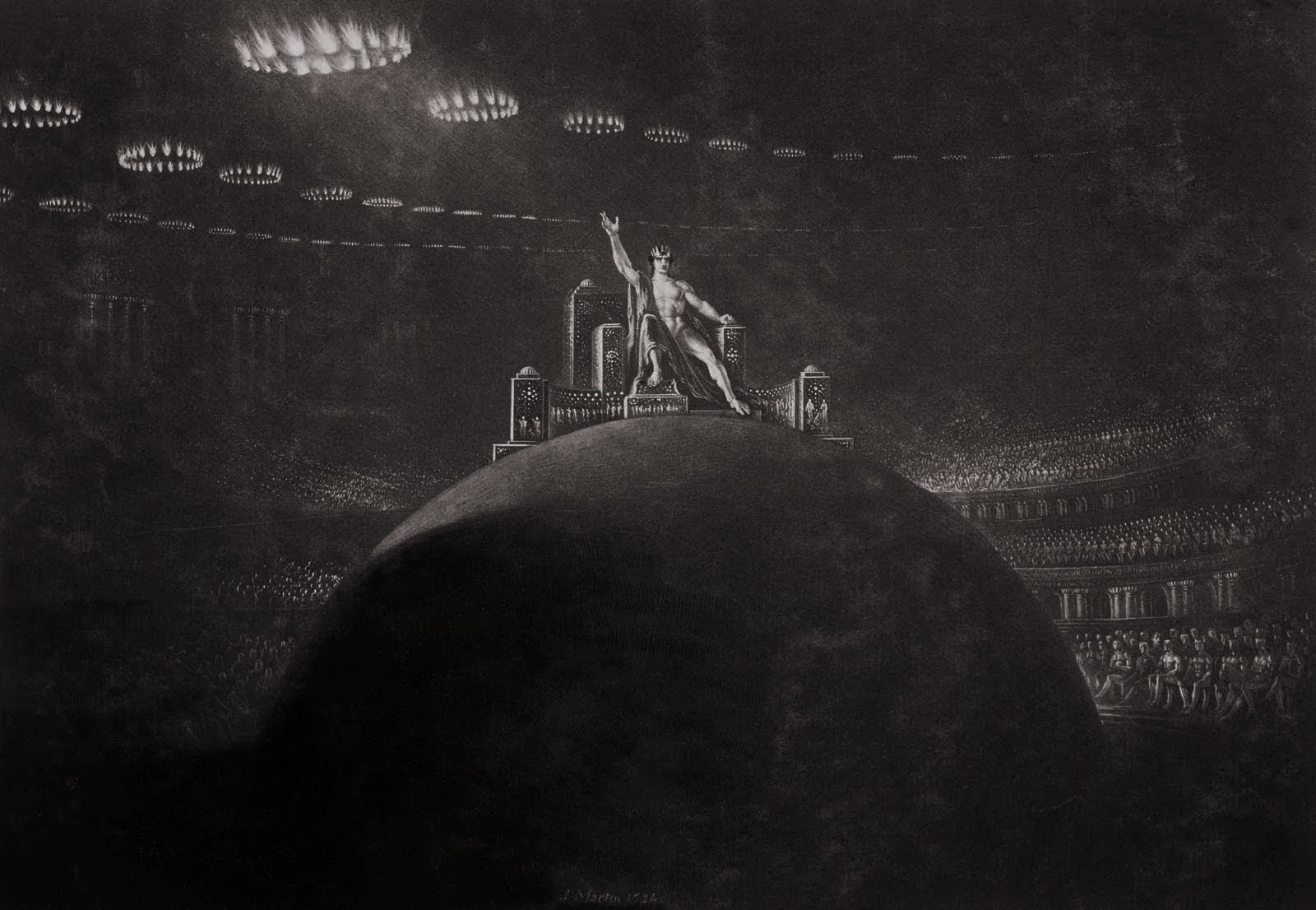
John Martin, Satan Presiding at the Infernal Council, c. 1823–1827

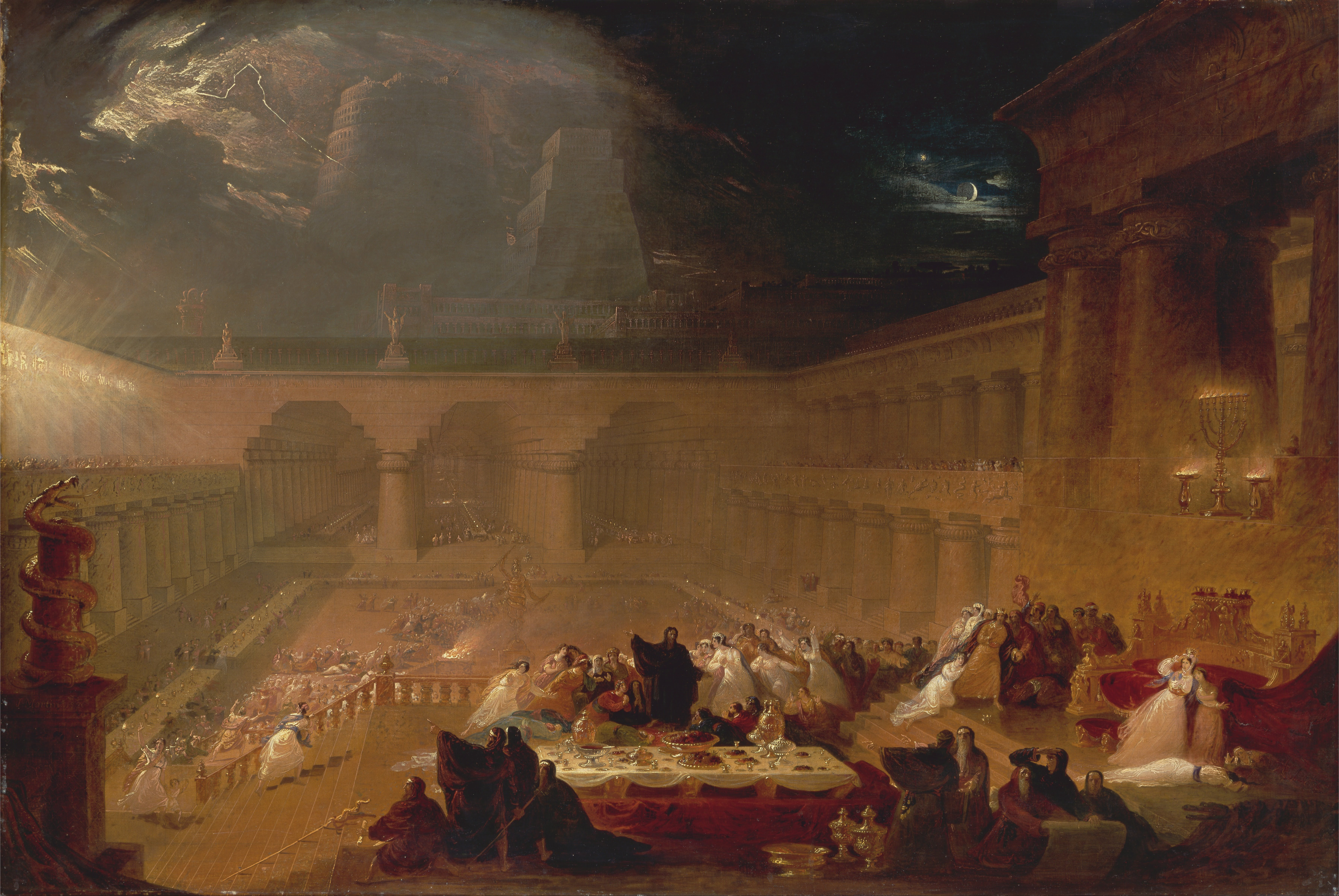
John Martin, Belshazzar's Feast, c. 1821

Satan Presiding at the Infernal Council is part of a series of 48 mezzotint engravings that British artist John Martin created between 1823 and 1827 to illustrate a new edition of Milton's Paradise Lost.

Popular success of John Martin's religious paintings, particularly Belshazzar's Feast (first exhibited at the British Institution in 1821, and published as engravings in 1826), led to a commission in 1823 from London publisher Septimus Prowett for Martin to illustrate a new edition of Milton's Paradise Lost. Martin made mezzotint engravings of 24 subjects in two sizes, 48 plates in all, with large prints measuring 8 by 11 inches (20 cm × 28 cm) and small prints 6 by 8 inches (15 cm × 20 cm).

The engraving of Satan Presiding at the Infernal Council illustrates the debate among Satan's "Stygian Council" in the council-chamber of Pandæmonium at the beginning of Book II of Paradise Lost. In the engraving, Satan is depicted enthroned at the heart of the hall of his Palace of Pandæmonium, at the centre of a rotunda filled with onlooking throngs of fallen angels, illuminated by the new technology of gaslight. His throne is placed atop a black hemisphere. The composition may be inspired by an illustration in the 1782 edition of William Beckford's novel Vathek.

The prints were published by subscription from 1825 to 1827, with two prints and accompanying text published each month, to be bound together by the subscriber. The engravings were also available to buy separately as sets or single prints. The book and the engravings were considerable critical and commercial success, with Martin's original compositions praised for their invention and power. Martin was encouraged to start work on engraved illustrations of the Bible, and published a further large format print of Satan Presiding at the Infernal Council in 1831, measuring 24 by 32 inches (61 cm × 81 cm).

According to musicologist Edward Lockspeiser, this engraving had a singular effect and a lasting influence on the composer Hector Berlioz.

The bold iconography and design of Martin's engravings were inspirations for scenes in D. W. Griffith's films The Birth of a Nation (1915) and Intolerance (1916), as well as for the design of the Galactic Senate in the 1999 Star Wars film Episode I – The Phantom Menace.
