= A Nude Woman Doing Her Hair Before a Mirror =

Painting by Christoffer Wilhelm Eckersberg

- En nøgen kvinde sætter sit hår foran et spejl (Danish)
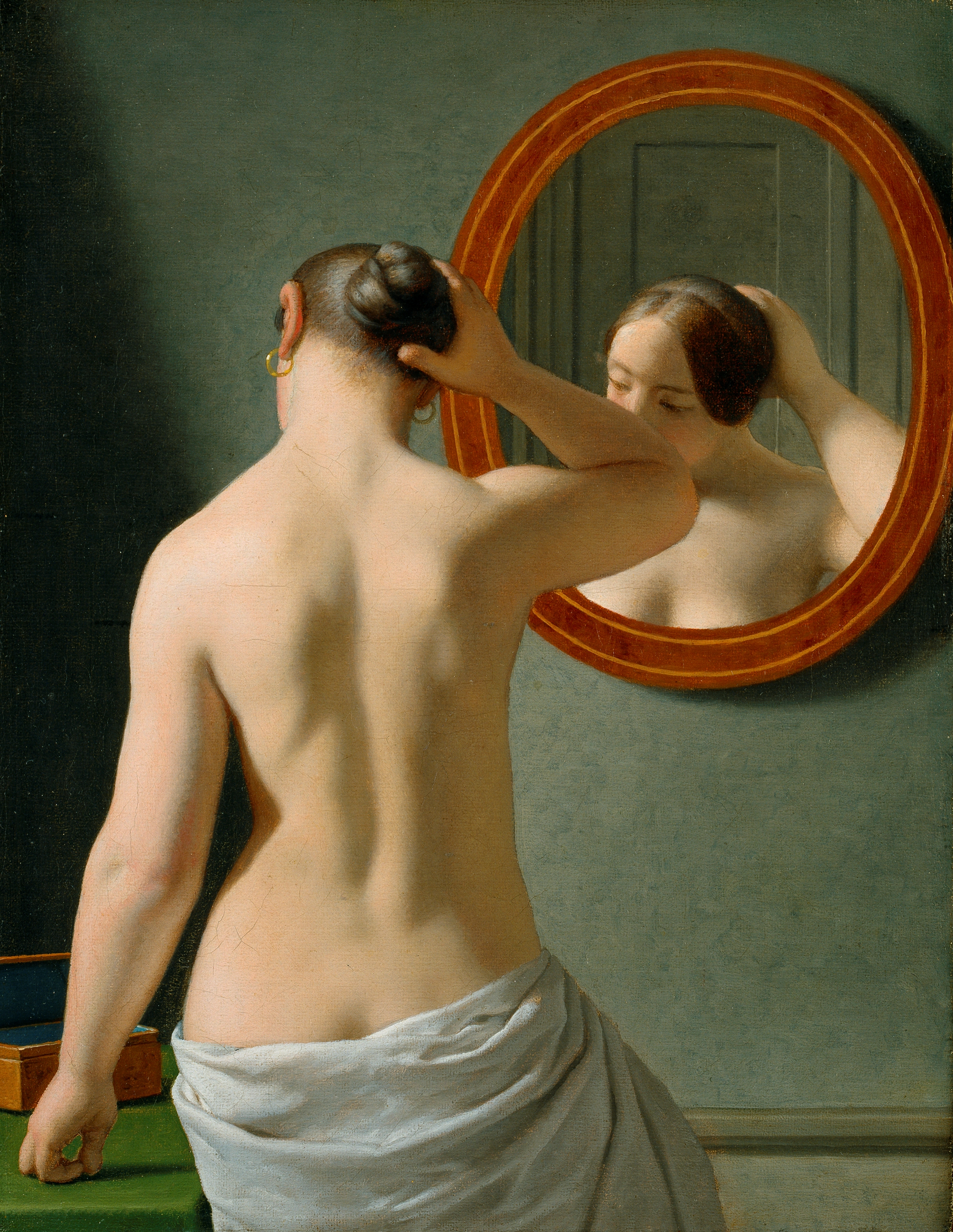
- Artist: Christoffer Wilhelm Eckersberg
- Year: 1841
- Medium: Oil on canvas
- Dimensions: 33.5 cm × 26 cm (13.2 in × 10 in)
- Location: Hirschsprung Collection (Den Hirschsprungske Samling), Copenhagen

A Nude Woman Doing her Hair before a Mirror (Danish: En nøgen kvinde sætter sit hår foran et spejl; often only Woman in Front of a Mirror or with the old title A nude seen from the back, woman doing her hair before a mirror) is an oil painting from 1841 by the Danish Golden Age painter CW Eckersberg. The painting is in the Hirschsprung Collection in Copenhagen. The relatively small image is regarded as one of the masterpieces of the Danish Golden Age, and is also one of the Hirschsprung Collection's 20 most important works.

The female model was named Florentine. During the same session she was painted by several of Eckersberg's students, and two students' paintings of the same subject are also known. The subject is—as the title suggests—a woman with her back turned in the course of an everyday chore. This subject has been used by other Danish painters, including Vilhelm Hammershøi, whose work, however, it is not a nude painting. Eckersberg's painting has been used as a cover motif on several book publications, and it has been called "the most popular Golden Age painting".

== Description ==
The painting shows a woman with her back turned, with a bare torso, by an oval mirror which reflects her face and the top of her chest. Her left hand rests on a green dressing table. On the table there is a box with an open lid. With her right hand she has lifted and arranged her brown hair, which is tightly set with a centre parting and chignon. Her large, red, left ear has a glistening gold earring. Her right earring is also seen, but not in the mirror reflection, and her hairstyle is also different in the mirror. The head is turned slightly to the left and lowered.

The woman's lower body is draped with a white cloth, which falls down over her buttocks so that the intergluteal cleft is visible. Her right leg seems to be slightly bent upwards in contrapposto.

The woman is positioned offset to the left relative to the centre line of the image, whereas the mirror is positioned to the right. The oval mirror with a wooden frame reflects so the face is seen approximately in the middle of the mirror. The mirror reflects the upper part of the woman's breasts. The woman's raised right arm covers parts of the mirror image so the viewer cannot see the bottom part of the face. In the mirror reflection the woman does not look at herself in the mirror, but her gaze is directed downwards to the left of the box. There is no eye contact with the viewer.

Light falls from the left so that the woman's left side is lit, especially the left shoulder, while the right side of the body and the right arm lie in shadow. The cleft of the left shoulder blade and the spine cast a shadow on the woman's back. The shadow of the left arm falls on the left side of the waist, so that the waist at first glance seems narrower than it actually is.

The wall on which the mirror hangs is greyish and solid in color, though with some texture. At the left side of the picture an oblique shadow falls on the wall, putting the left part of the wall in shade. At the bottom right of the picture is a panel at the height of the woman's thigh. In the mirror reflection a closed door can be seen.

== History ==
=== Background ===
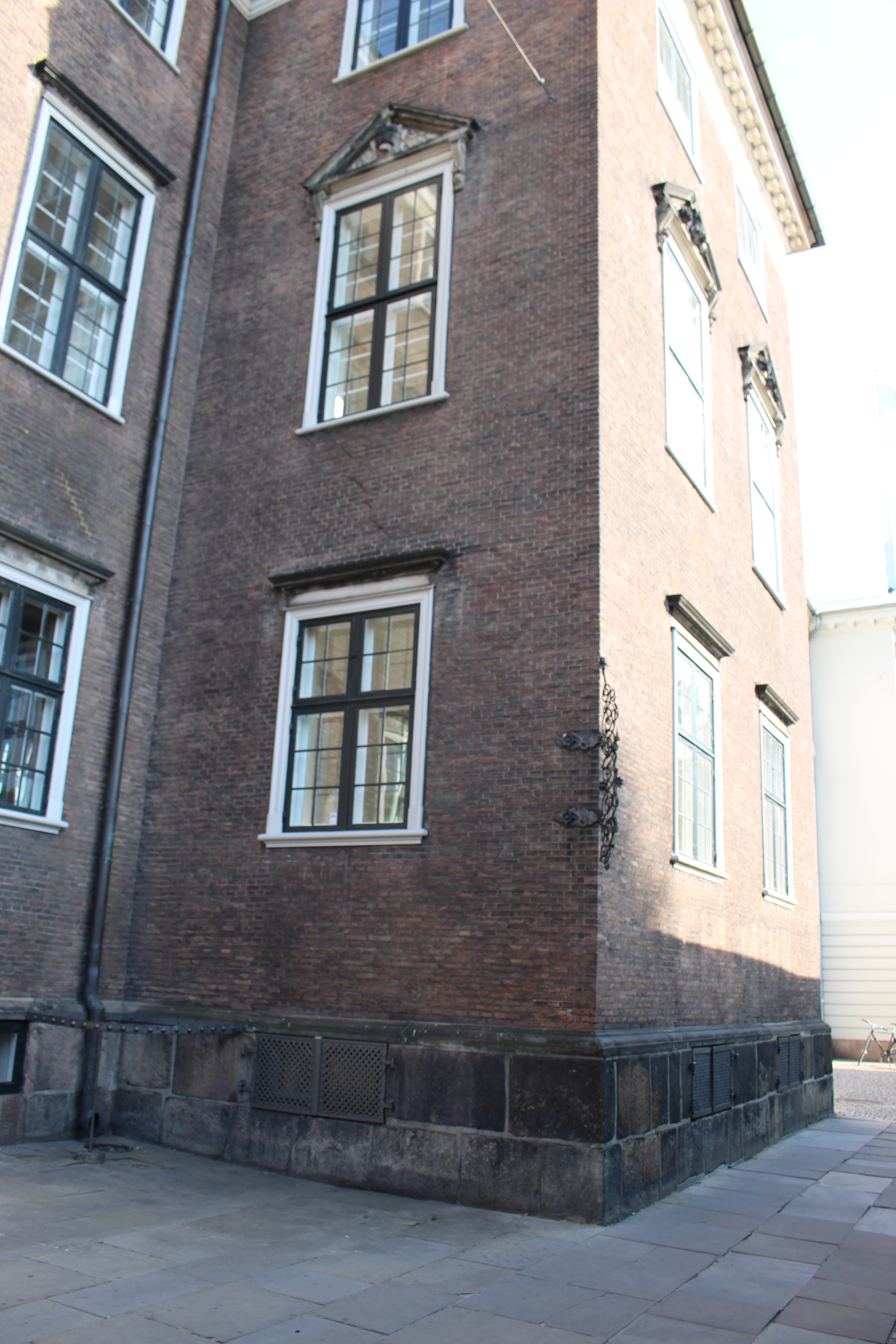
Charlottenborg Palace, southern risalit, where the painting was probably painted.

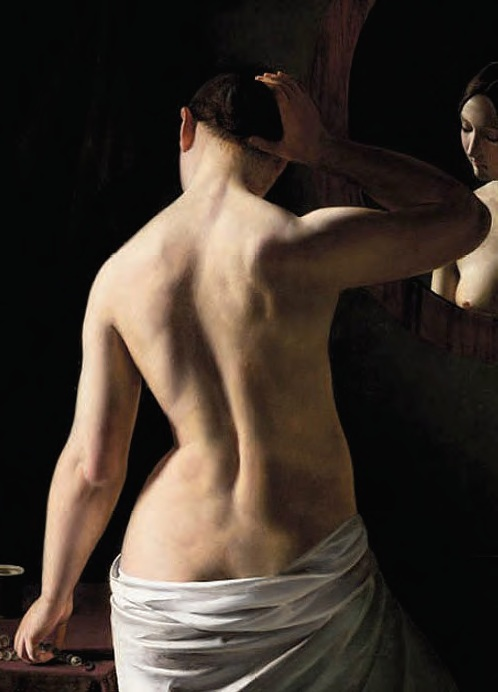
Sally Henriques's painting of Florentine.

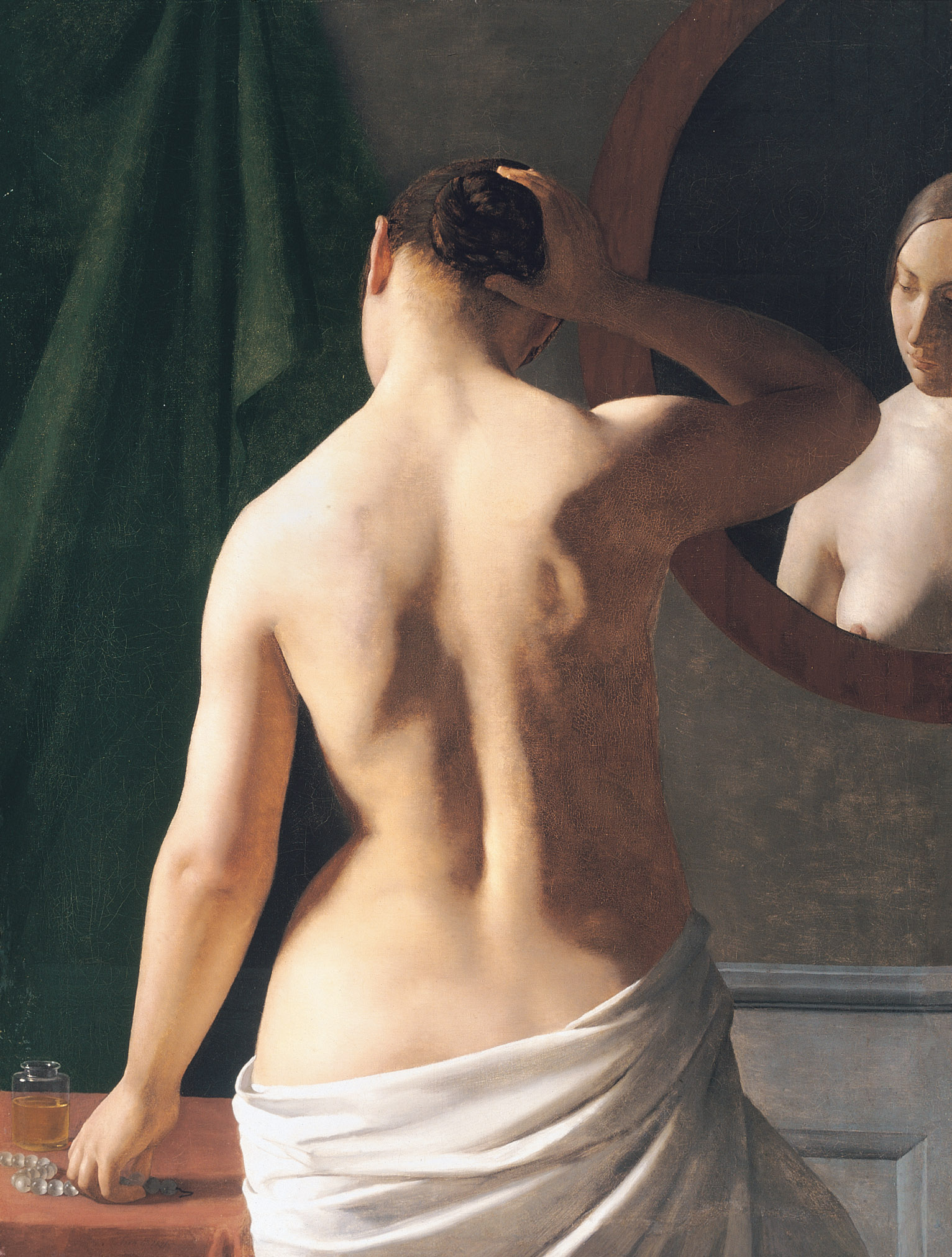
Ludvig August Smith's painting.

Eckersberg was a professor at the Royal Danish Academy of Fine Arts and in 1833 had introduced the discipline of students painting female nudes. He lived in Charlottenborg Palace on the ground floor next to Kongens Nytorv public square. Eckersberg's large studio was located in the southern risalit of the palace. It was usually from here that Eckersberg painted with his students, and the painting with the woman comes from a session in late summer 1841. The model's name was Florentine and she was a model that summer from 12 June to 16 September.

The position she holds in Eckersberg's painting, he and the students drew and painted between 9 August and 16 September. Two of the students' paintings are known, those by Ludvig August Smith and Sally Henriques. The other students were Carl Dahl, H.J. Hammer and Sally Henriques's brother Nathan Henriques. The composition of the two students' paintings are similar. Henriques painted the model's back as more s-shaped, and there are differences in how the face is covered by the right arm and the angle at which the arm is held. The colour scheme also seems to be different. The woman's back in Ludvig August Smith's painting has an attitude that follows Eckersberg's more than Henriques's. Unlike Eckersberg, Smith painted the woman roughly in the middle of the image. In Eckersberg's painting the mirror image assumes a greater weight. From the angles of the images we can conclude that Eckersberg reserved the best seat for himself while Smith stood by Eckerberg's right side and Henriques on the far right.

In both student works, one sees a necklace at her left hand and a bottle. From the wall hangs a draped blanket. Henriques's and Smith's paintings are somewhat larger than Eckersberg's small picture. Henriques's is 88 × 62 cm, while Smith's is 120 × 93 cm.

Eckersberg prepared a study named Young girl doing her hair. This image was created between 9 August and 11 September 1841 and resembles the finished composition in pencil and watercolour. This image is the same size as the famous painting. The pose of Florentine was reused by Eckersberg years later in July 1850, in a drawing using pencil and sepia and titled Standing model doing her hair. The female model stands in contrapposto with her right hand holding her hair as in the oil painting from 1841. However, the naked model is not draped and Eckerberg's point of view is completely different, as the woman is in profile and is seen from the right side.

=== Provenance ===
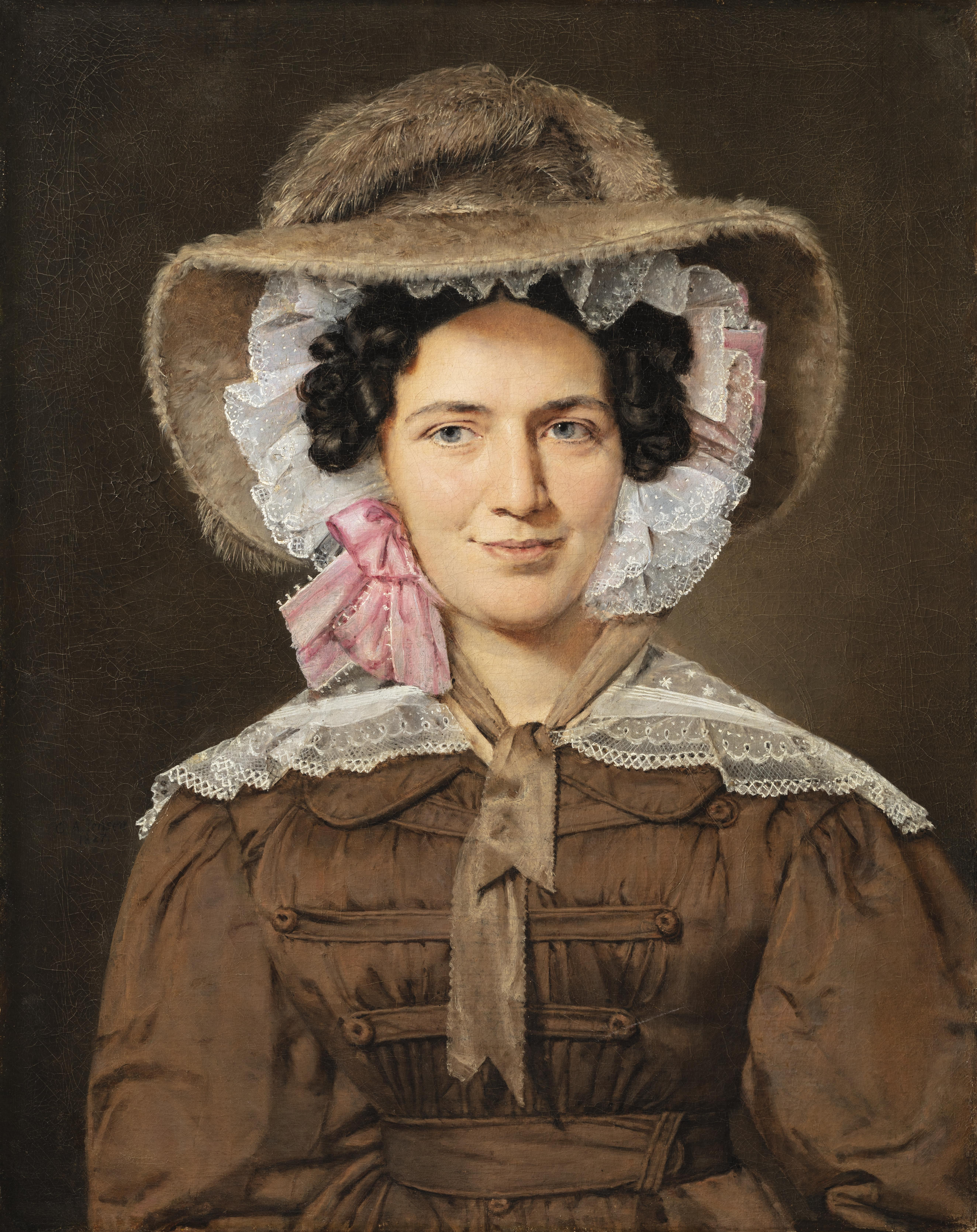
Christine Stampe, the art patron and first buyer of the painting. C.A. Jensen, Portrait of Baroness Christine Stampe (1827, Thorvaldsen Museum).

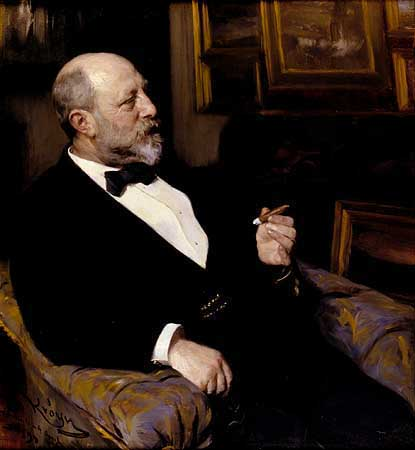
P.S. Krøyer's portrait of the artwork's last buyer, Heinrich Hirschsprung (1899, Hirschsprung Collection).

In certain written works the painting is dated to about 1837. The reason is apparently that Emil Hannover in his book The Painter C. W. Eckersberg: A Study in Danish Art History, wrote about the painting: "Seems to have been painted around the time of the female model studies (...) belonging to the Academy of Art." Recent authoritative works from the Hirschsprung Collection indicate, however, the year 1841. The correction came about after examination of Eckersberg's diaries and material from the Academy's archives.

Eckersberg sold the painting in 1843, when Bertel Thorvaldsen visited Eckersberg's studio at Charlottenborg with Baroness Christine Stampe on 9 February. She bought it for 20 daler. "Mrs. Stampe got the little half-naked figure of Florentine" wrote Eckersberg in his diary and the day after "Mrs. Stampe sent 20 daler for the small Figure with bare back at her Toilet." Later it came into the ownership of merchant Heinrich Hirschsprung, and was registered in the Emil Hannover catalogue of Eckersberg's works from 1898. This was after Hirschsprung had acquired it in 1895 from Mrs Nanna Holtum.

=== Exhibition history ===
The painting has been exhibited several times and catalogued: Eckersberg in 1895 (catalogue number 293), Hirschsprung 1902 (969), and London 1907 (166). It was part of the exhibition The Naked Golden Age which was shown at the Hirschsprung Collection from 8 September to 27 November 1994. Here it was exhibited with the accompanying sketch and L.A. Smith's contemporaneous painting. The preface of the exhibition catalogue mentions that the seeds for the exhibition lay in questions that arose from the uncertainty of the dating and the absence of Eckersberg's signature. In 2013, the painting, along with 69 other works from the Hirschsprung Collection, was lent to the Hamburger Kunsthalle for the exhibition Denmark's Breakthrough to Modernism: The Hirschsprung Collection from Eckersberg to Hammershøi. It was not part of the National Gallery of Denmark's large Eckersberg exhibition in 2015, Eckersberg – A Beautiful Lie, but was, however, reproduced and analysed in the exhibition's accompanying book.

The contemporaneous painting of his student, Ludvig August Smith, Female Model in Front of a Mirror is in the Loeb Danish Art Collection. Eckersberg's study in pencil and watercolour is in the National Gallery in Oslo, while the drawing from 1850 with the female model standing in Florentine's posture has been in private ownership since it was catalogued for the exhibition The Naked Golden Age.

== Interpretation and analysis ==
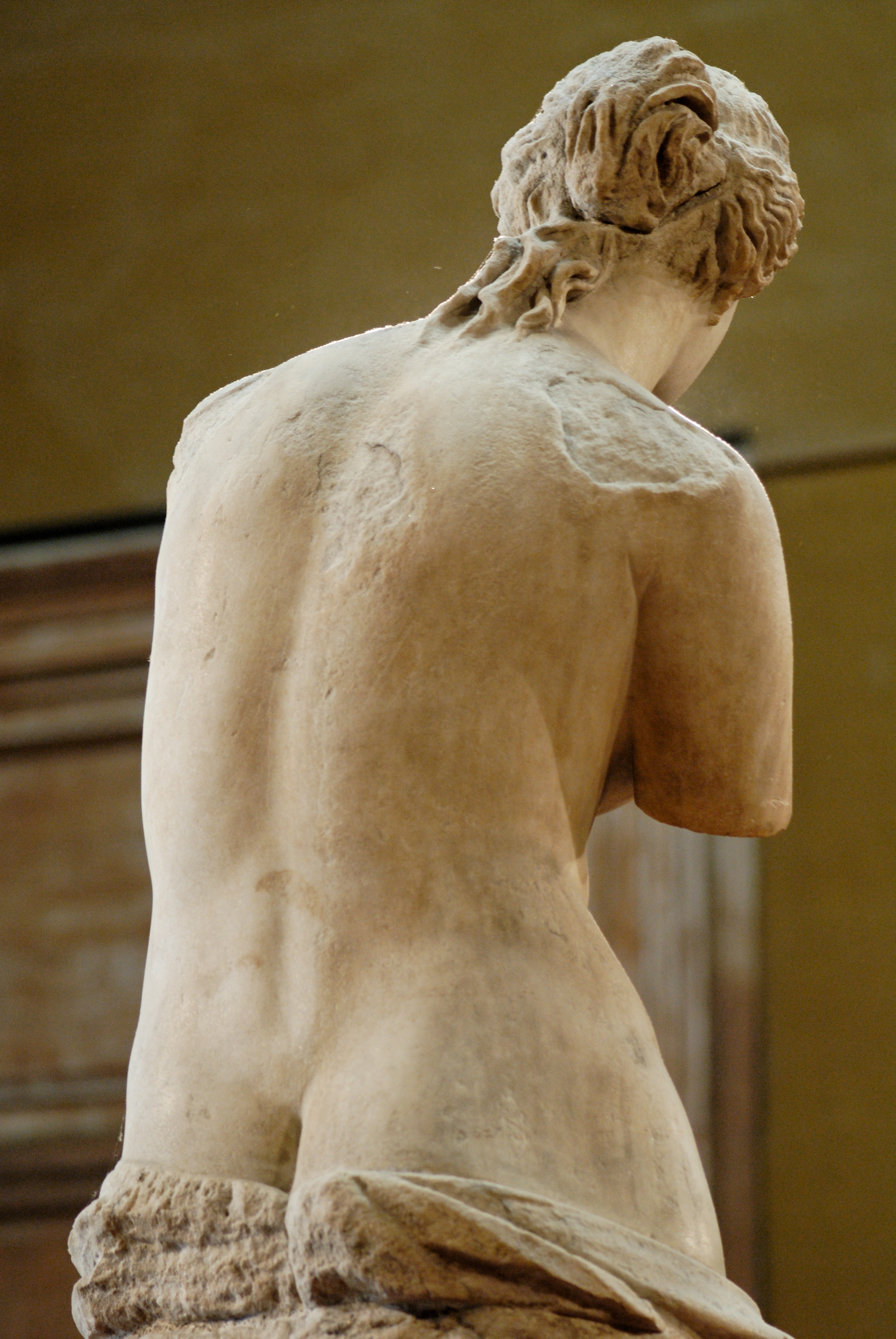
Venus de Milo seen from behind. Eckersberg's painting has certain similarities with this sculpture.

The image depicts a woman seen from behind while at her toilet. Its private setting is conveyed through the muted colors and Eckersberg's composition, which partially reveals and conceals the woman's body through the edge of the mirror and the cloth around her hips. The door behind her includes a keyhole through which the viewer's position may be implied.

The model's position goes back to ancient Greek ideals, as seen in the sculpture Venus de Milo. The painting has also been called the "Hirschsprung Venus", and in Marianne Saabye's words shows "[classic] calm and grace". Venus de Milo was found in 1820, and the Academy had acquired a casting in the late 1820s.

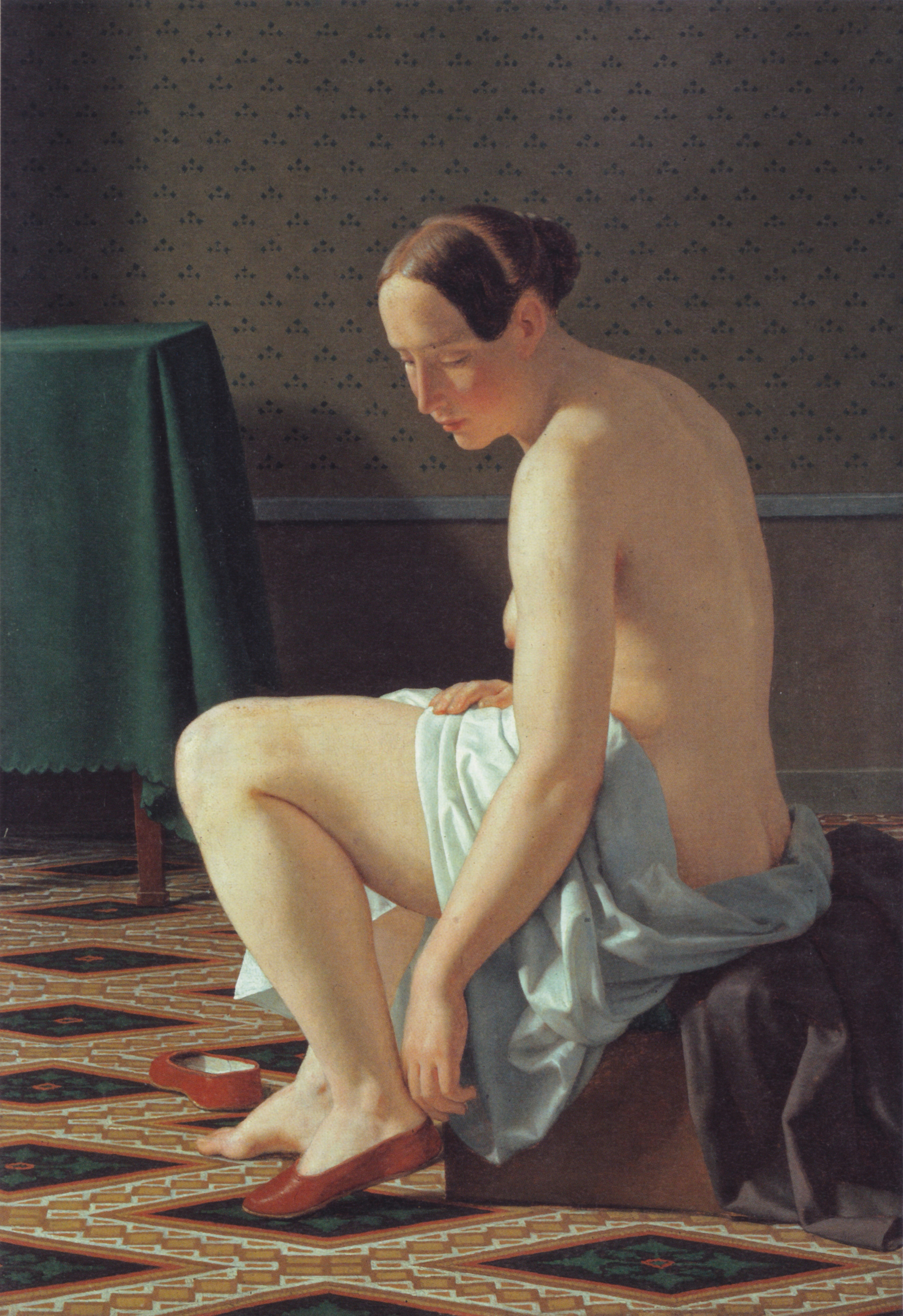
C.W. Eckersberg: Naked Woman in the Process of Pulling On Her Slippers (1843) is another painting depicting a draped half-naked woman in an everyday scene. Ny Carlsberg Glyptotek.

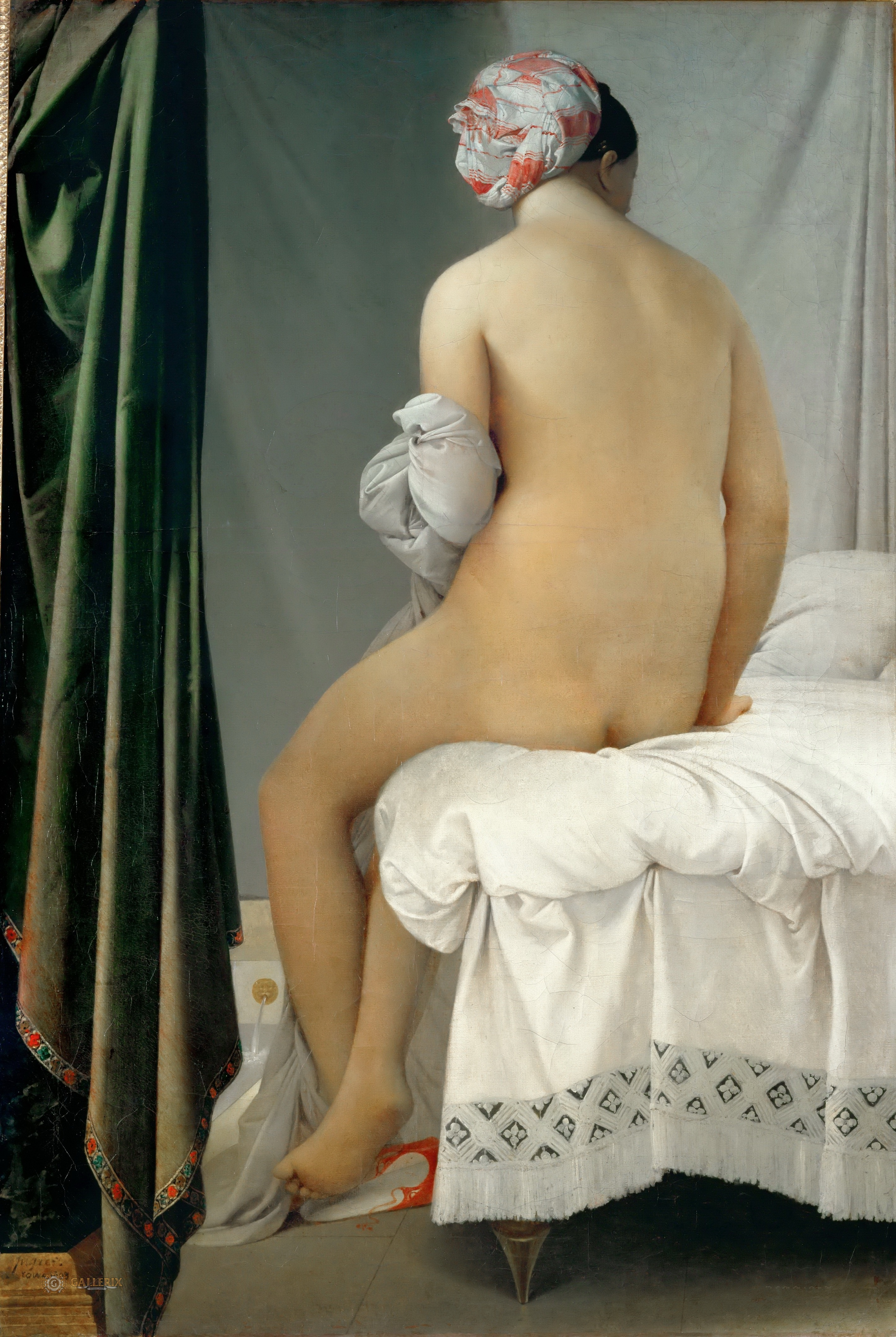
Jean Auguste Dominique Ingres: La Grande Baigneuse, (1808), Louvre. It has often been discussed whether Eckersberg knew about Ingres's paintings. They were in Rome at the same time, so it is not unlikely. They were also both students of Jacques-Louis David.

The absence of eye contact with the viewer in A Nude Woman Doing Her Hair Before a Mirror is seen in several of Eckersberg's other nude paintings. This applies to Female model study: Florentine (1840), Naked Woman in the Process of Pulling On Her Slippers (1843), A Young Girl Undressing (1844), and the Academy of Fine Arts' five nude paintings from 1837. In the study of Florentine from 1840, she is seen uncovered from the front and the absent eye contact has been interpreted as "a pronounced discretion" on Eckersberg's part towards the female model. Another common feature of Eckersberg's model studies from the 1830s and 1840s is the incidence of light from the left side of the image, regardless of how the model is posed.

Neela Struck has noticed geometric patterns in the picture. In addition to the upright rectangular format, there is the oval shape of the mirror and the triangle that is formed by the left arm and its shadow on the body, as well as the triangle by the bent right hand. She believes that "nowhere is it clearer than in this picture how Eckersberg connected his interest in the laws of the picture, in mathematics and geometry, with his interest in the study of the naked female body."

Eckersberg's picture is not the only popular Danish painting of a woman with her back turned. Later painters also used the motif. Perhaps best known is Vilhelm Hammershøi's pictures of his wife Ida Hammershøi. Here, the painter, like Eckersberg, shows the woman in the process of everyday chores; however, the woman is only a small part of the interior painting and she is fully clothed. Examples are Interior with Young Woman Seen from the Back (c. 1903–04) and Living Room in Strandgade with Sunshine on the Floor. For Interior with Young Woman Seen from the Back the woman stands close to the wall, her head is turned and her hair is done up so that the neck is visible and parts of the wall panel are visible. Anna Ancher's Girl in the Kitchen (c. 1886) and Interior also have the back-turned woman as a motif.

Finally, there is Poul Ekelund's painting Standing figure: Woman seen from the back 1/2 figure (1974) showing strong inspiration from Eckersberg's painting. Ekelund's painting is part of the National Gallery of Denmark's collection.

== Reception ==
The painting is now part of the Hirschsprung Collection, where it is on the list of the museum's 20 main works. The museum's former director, Marianne Saabye, has called it "one of the most internationally famous Danish works of art". Others who have rated the work of art highly are Hans Edvard Nørregård-Nielsen, who considers it one of the period's Danish masterpieces, and Uwe Max Jensen has called it "the most popular Golden Age painting in existence and one of the masterpieces of Danish painting". The travel guide The Rough Guide to Copenhagen mentions the painting as one amongst four paintings in the book's description of the Hirschsprung Collection.

Sally Henriques' much lesser known painting with the same motif as Eckersberg's painting was sold at Bruun Rasmussen Art Auctions for DKK 520,000 in 2002. The auction house wrote a few years later that Eckersberg's painting was "not only Eckersberg's most famous nude model study, but one of the artist's most famous works in general".

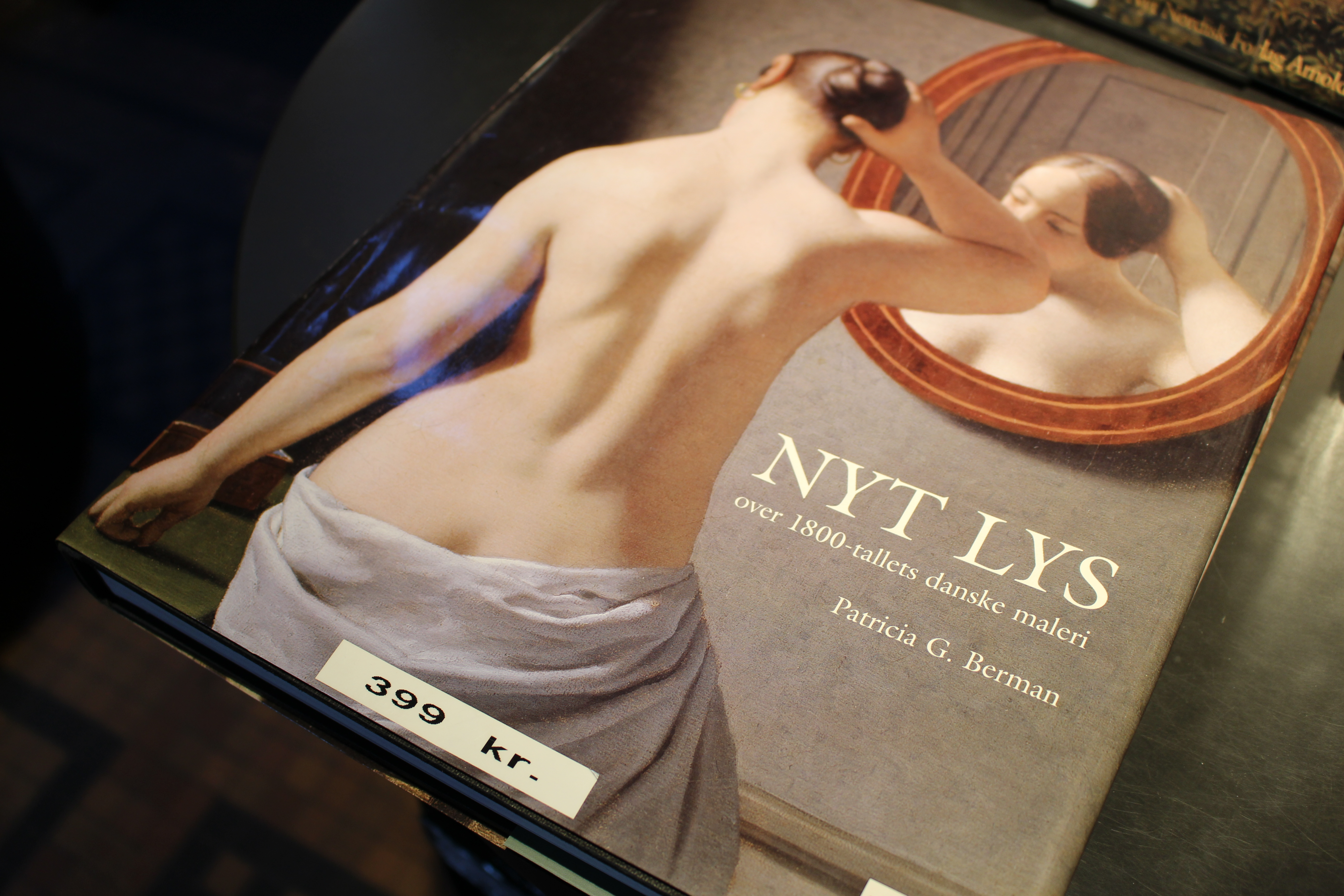
Eckersberg's painting used for the front cover of a book about 19th century Danish art. Patricia G. Berman's book sold in Thorvaldsen Museum's kiosk.

The popular painting has been used for several book covers. Both Patricia G. Berman's Danish New Light on 19th Century Danish Painting and English In Another Light: Danish Painting in the Nineteenth Century use the image. The painting is also reproduced on the front cover of The Naked Golden Age, the catalogue published in connection with the Hirschsprung Collection's exhibition in 1994, where pictures from Eckersberg and his students were shown. The Hirschsprung Collection sells a reproduction of the painting, which is larger than the original.

The artwork has been called "a painting with understated eroticism", and its erotic hints meant that it was initially banned on Facebook when a tourism organisation in 2015 wanted to use an image of the painting in an advertisement on social media. Facebook stated as a reason for the censorship: "We do not allow images or videos that suggest nudity through, for example, blurring or cropping. Such ads are sensitive and typically provoke negative reactions from viewers." However, Facebook later admitted that the censorship was a mistake and allowed the image to be used in an ad on the site.

== Bibliography ==
- Bramsen, Henrik (1994). Fra rokoko til guldalder. Ny dansk kunsthistorie (in Danish). Vol. 3.
- Brenna, Arne (1974). "Aktmaleri fra dansk guldalder". Kunst og Kultur (in Danish): 83–102.
- Bøgh Rønberg, Lene; Monrad, Kasper; Linnet, Ragni (2001). Twee gouden eeuwen. Schilderkunst uit Nederland en Denemarken (in Dutch). Waanders Zwolle / Rijksmuseum Amsterdam. ISBN 9040095272.
- Fabritius, Elisabeth (2005). "Female Model Before a Mirror, 1841" ( (PDF)). The Ambassador John L. Loeb Jr. Danish Art Collection. John L. Loeb. Archived from the original on 21 April 2016.
- Hannover, Emil (1898). Maleren C.W. Eckersberg: En Studie i dansk kunsthistorie (in Danish). Kunstforeningen. ISBN 9781294492726.
- Monrad, Kasper (2015). Eckersberg. National Gallery of Denmark. ISBN 978-87-92023-69-8.
- Rostrup, Haavard (1950). "De moderne samlingers væxt". Meddelelser Fra NY Carlsberg Glyptotek (in Danish): 1–34.
- Johansen, Annette; Saabye, Marianne (1994). Den nøgne guldalder: modelbilleder, C.W. Eckersberg og hans elever (in Danish). Copenhagen: Hirschsprung Collection. ISBN 9788798136965.
- Schiedermair, Joachim (2005). "Problematisk likhet – Portretter som upålitelige bærere av identitet. Eksempler fra billedkunsten og litteraturen". Edda (in Norwegian). 92 (2): 166–176. doi:10.18261/ISSN1500-1989-2005-02-05.
- Vaughan, William (1989). L'art du XIXe siècle 1780–1850 (in French). Citadelles. ISBN 9782850880261.
- Villadsen, Ole (1993). Den gyldne tid. Guldalderen. Billedsamtaler (in Danish).
- Walther, Ingo E., ed. (2005). Masterpieces of Western Art II. Taschen. ISBN 3-8228-4746-1.
- Weilbach, Philip (1872). Maleren Eckersbergs Levned og Værker (in Danish). Creative Media Partners, LLC. OCLC 1534787295.
