= A Favourite Greyhound of Prince Albert =

Painting by Edwin Landseer

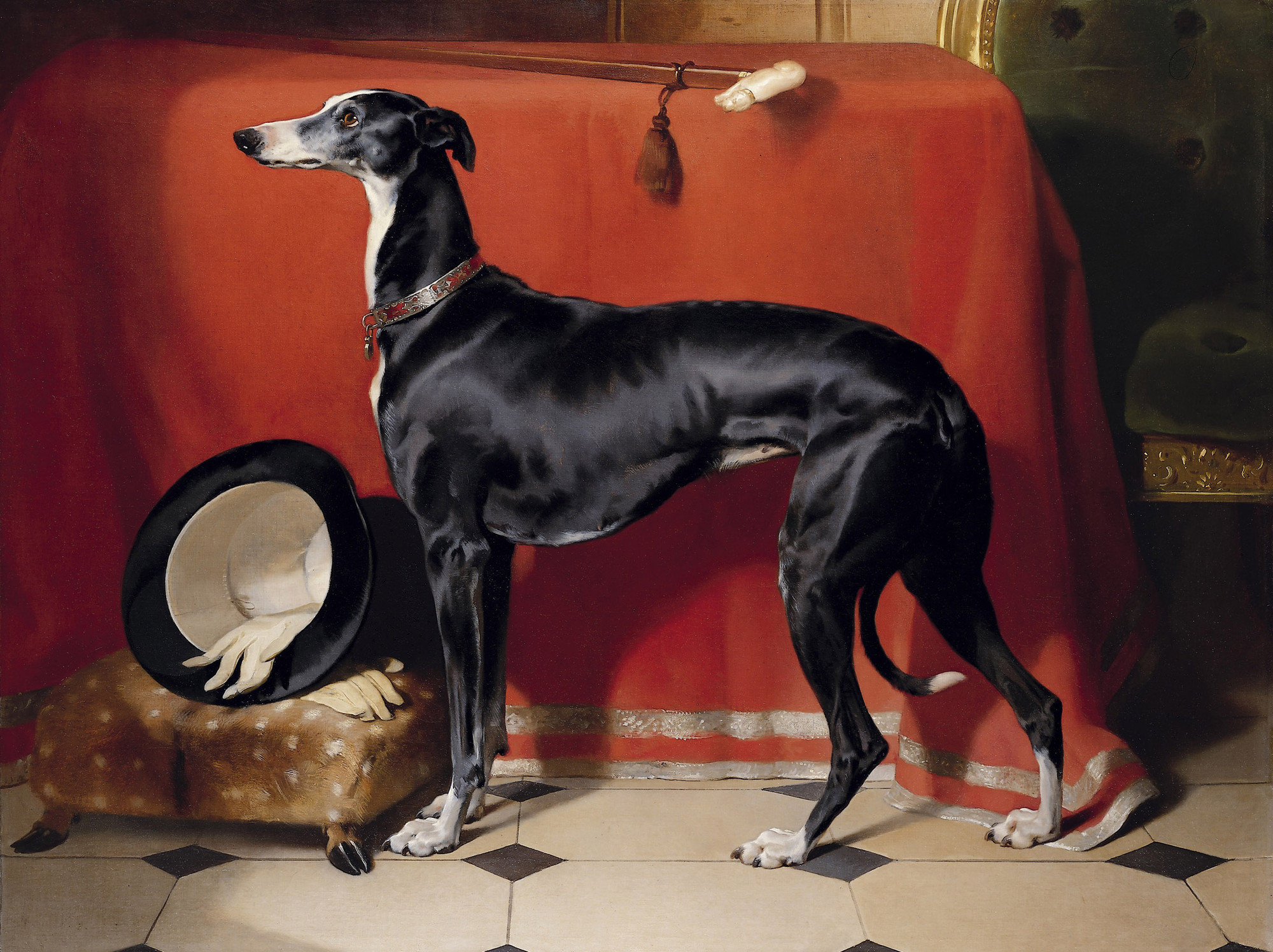
- Artist: Edwin Landseer
- Year: 1841
- Type: Oil on canvas, portrait
- Dimensions: 110 cm × 143 cm (44 in × 56.2 in)
- Location: Royal Collection

A Favourite Greyhound of Prince Albert is an 1841 oil on canvas painting by the British artist Edwin Landseer. It depicts Eos, a greyhound that Prince Albert brought with him to England when he married Queen Victoria. It is also known by the shorter title Eos.

Landseer was known for his portrait paintings of animals. He shows Eos guarding her master's leather gloves, top hat and ivory-topped cane. The red of the tablecloth provides a dramatic contrast to the black of the dog's coat and the top hat.

Victoria gave the painting to Albert as a Christmas present in 1841 and it was hung in the Prince's Dressing Room at Buckingham Palace. It remains in the Royal Collection. It was displayed at the Royal Academy's Summer Exhibition of 1842. The same year Landseer produced another work featuring Eos with the infant Victoria, Princess Royal.

== Bibliography ==
- Herrmann, Luke. Nineteenth Century British Painting. Charles de la Mare, 2000.
- Lloyd, Christopher. The Royal Collection: A Thematic Exploration of the Paintings in the Collection of Her Majesty the Queen. Sinclair-Stevenson, 1992.
- Marsden, Jonathan. Victoria & Albert: Art & Love. Royal Collection, 2010.
