= A View of Toledo and the River Tagus =

Painting by David Roberts

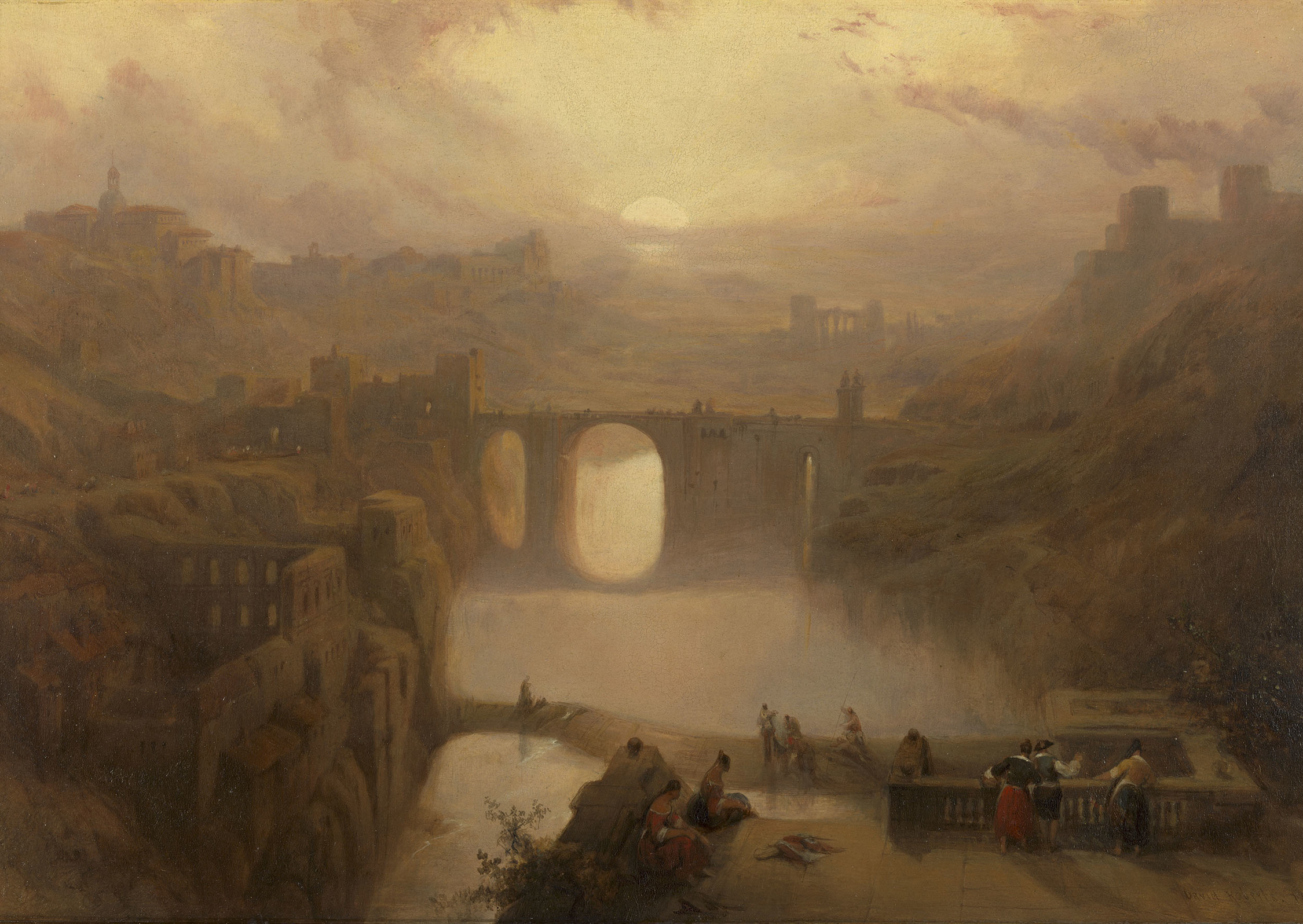
- Artist: David Roberts
- Year: 1841
- Type: Oil on panel, cityscape painting
- Dimensions: 25 cm × 36.4 cm (9.8 in × 14.3 in)
- Location: Royal Collection

A View of Toledo and the River Tagus is an 1841 landscape painting by the British artist David Roberts. It features a panoramic view of the River Tagus near the city of Toledo in central Spain. It depicts the Alcantara Bridge over the river. The young Queen Victoria had admired Roberts' work at the Royal Academy Exhibition of 1840 and subsequently provides him with several commissions . Although Roberts had travelled in Spain extensively in the 1830s he has never visited Toledo due to an outbreak of cholera. He based this on sketches produced by a fellow traveller, Edmund Head. The composition owes much to J.M.W. Turner's 1828 watercolour Florence from San Miniato. It met with "perfect appropriation" from Victoria and her husband Prince Albert. The work remains in the Royal Collection today.

== Bibliography ==
- Clarke, Deborah & Remington, Vanessa. Scottish Artists 1750-1900: From Caledonia to the Continent. Royal Collection Trust, 2015.
- Sim, Katherine. David Roberts R.A., 1796–1864: A Biography. Quartet Books, 1984.
