= Nathaniel Marchant =

English gem engraver (1739–1816)

Nathaniel Marchant RA (1739–1816) was an English gem engraver.

== Life ==
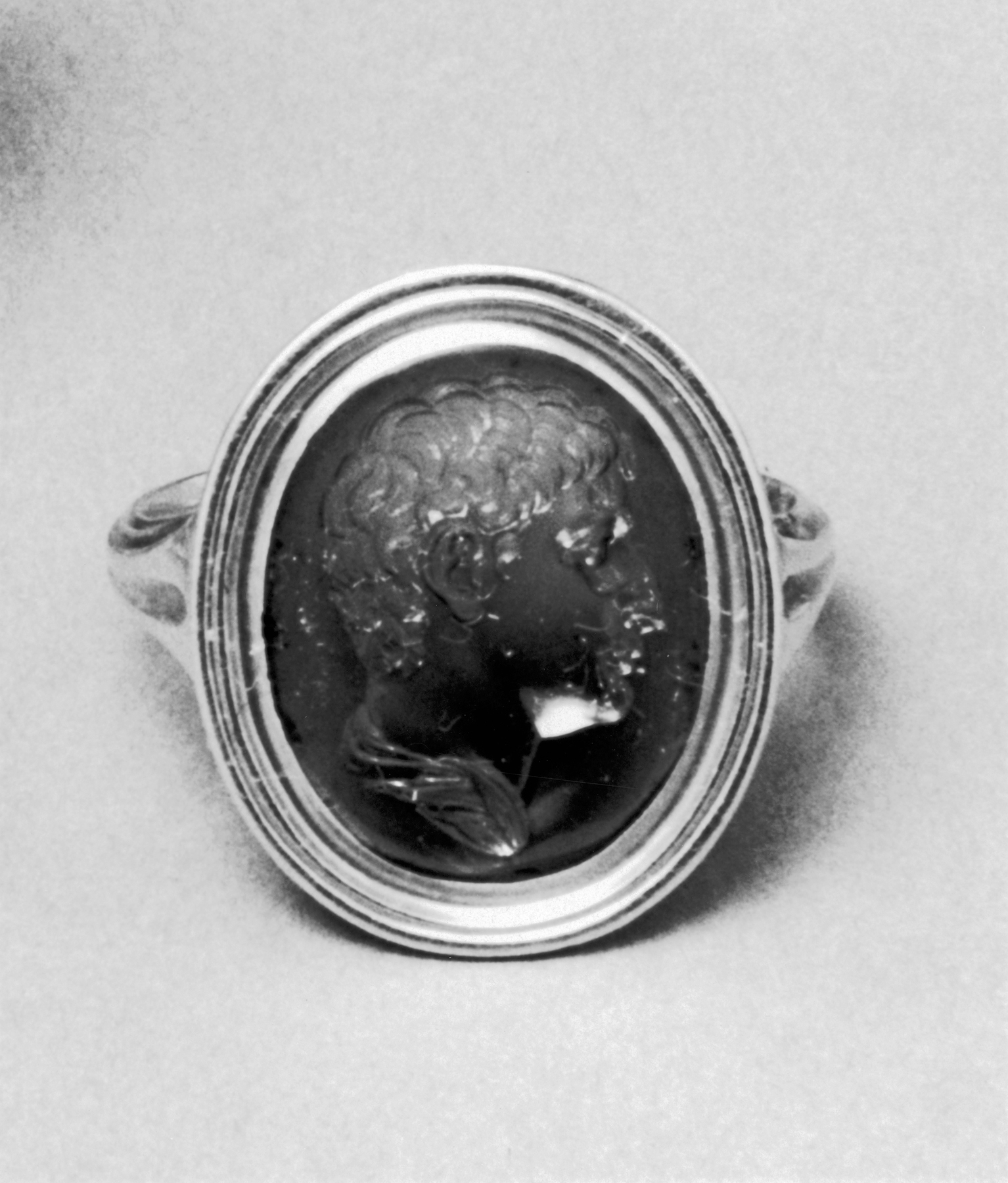
Nathaniel Marchant - Ring with Intaglio of Marcellus - Walters 421137

Marchant was born in Sussex in 1739. He studied under Edward Burch, and in 1766 became a member of the Incorporated Society of Artists.

In 1773 he went to Rome, where he remained until 1789, when, having already gained a considerable at reputation for his engraved gems, he returned to London.

He was noted as a sculptor of intaglios, medals, and poetical designs for cameos His subjects included copies from the antique, adaptations of famous paintings and portraits of his contemporaries. He held several appointments, including as assistant engraver to the mint, gem sculptor to the Prince of Wales, engraver to the king, and from 1800, engraver to the Stamp Office.

He was elected an associate of the Royal Academy in 1791 and a full academician in 1809. When elected to the academy, Marchant originally offered a set of impressions of gems he had cut as his diploma work.They were however rejected on the grounds that they were not, as required by the academy, "original work". He then sent a cast of a female head, which was also declined "casts not being deemed admissible from sculptors." He finally submitted a gem which was accepted.

In 1792 he published a catalogue of a hundred of his gems.

He died in 1816.
