= The Celestial City and the River of Bliss =

Painting by John Martin

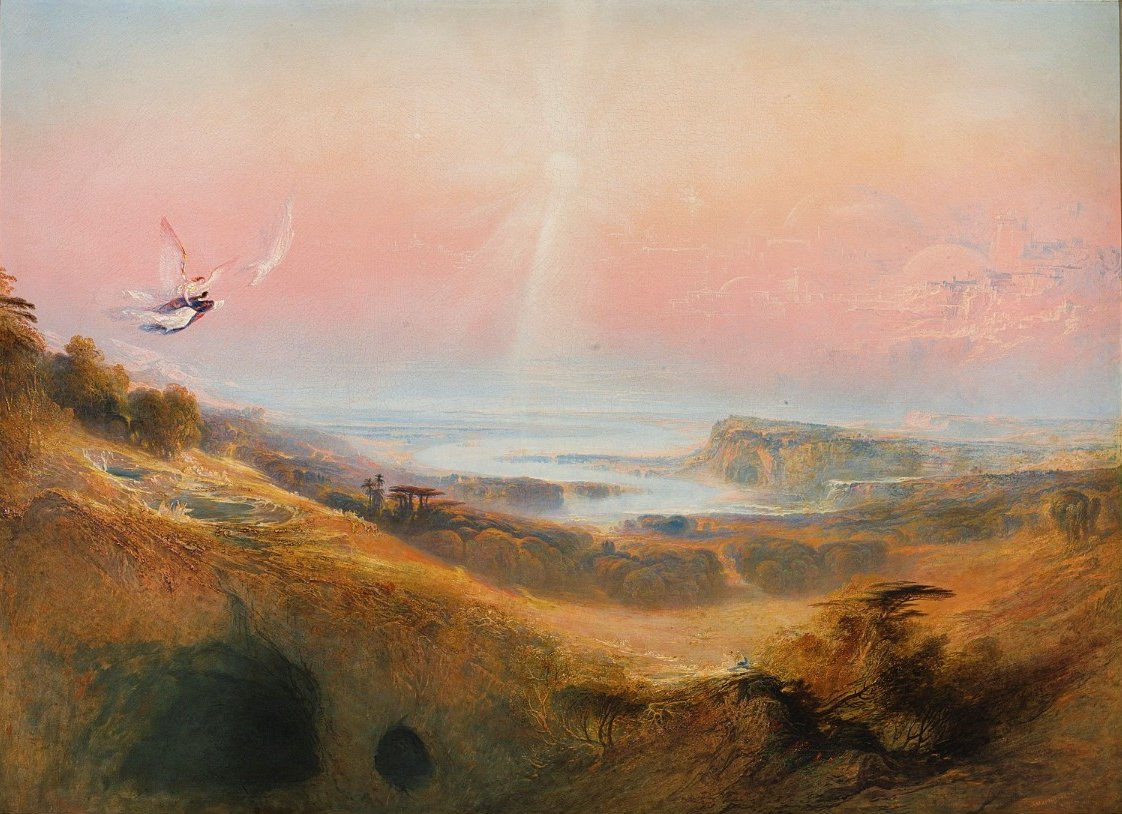
- Artist: John Martin
- Year: 1841
- Type: Oil on canvas, history painting
- Dimensions: 123.1 cm × 194.3 cm (48.5 in × 76.5 in)
- Location: Private collection

The Celestial City and the River of Bliss is an oil painting on canvas by the British artist John Martin, from 1841. It is inspired by John Milton's 1667 epic poem Paradise Lost. It was produced after Martin's return to oil painting in 1840, and alongside a companion painting, Pandemonium, which is now in the Louvre. Both of the paintings were inspired by earlier mezzotint designs he had produced and were displayed at the Royal Academy Exhibition of 1841 at the National Gallery, in London.

== Bibliography ==
- Feaver, William. John Martin, 1789-1854. Hazlitt, Gooden & Fox, 1975.
- Myrone, Martin. John Martin: Apocalypse. Tate Publishing, 2012.
- Pointon, Marcia R. Milton & English Art. Manchester University Press, 1970.
