= Pandemonium (painting) =

Painting by John Martin

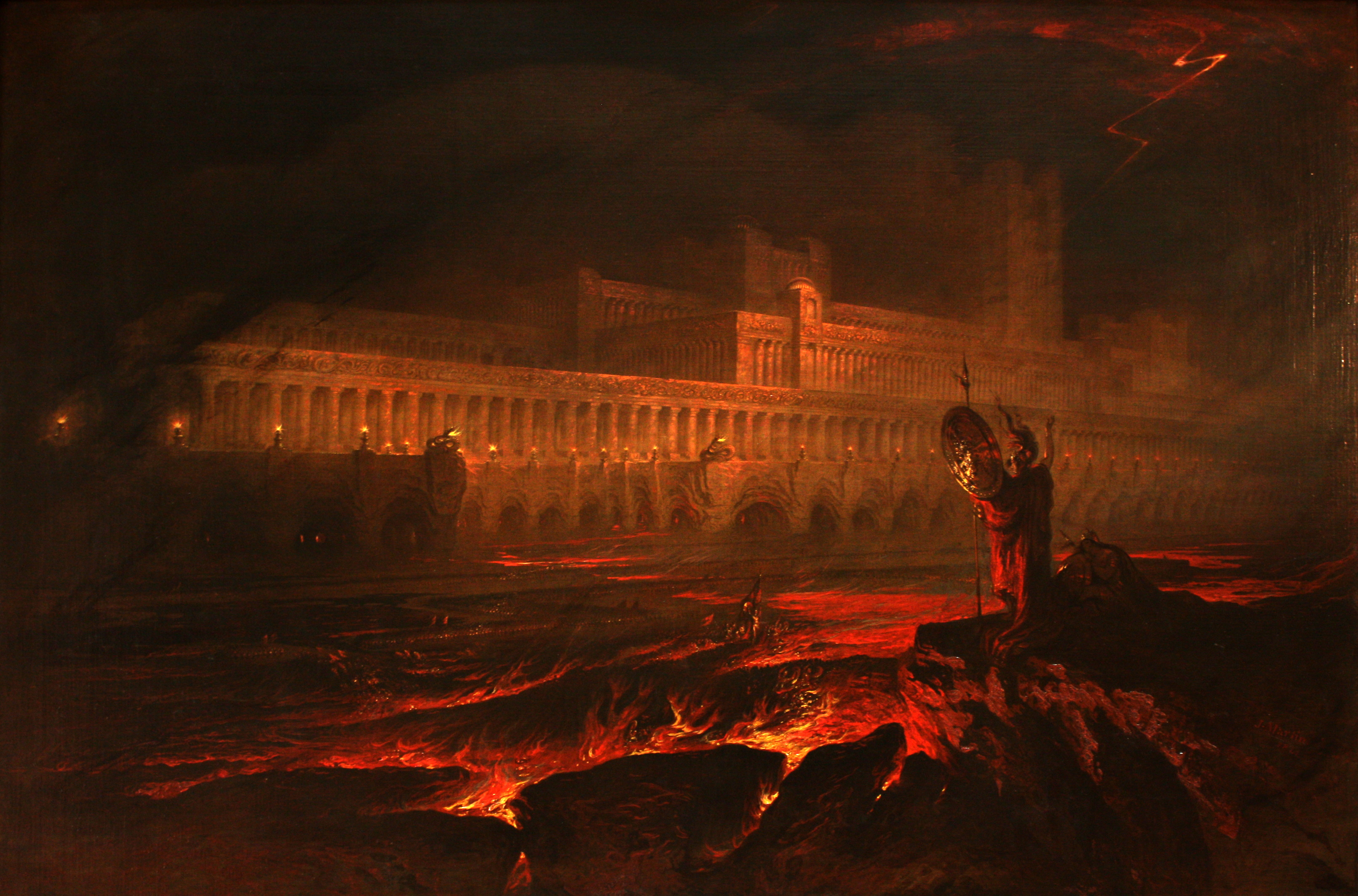
- Artist: John Martin
- Year: 1841
- Type: Oil on canvas, landscape painting
- Dimensions: 123 cm × 185 cm (48 in × 73 in)
- Location: Louvre, Paris

Pandemonium is an oil painting on canvas by the English artist John Martin, from 1841. It is held at the Louvre, in Paris.

== History and description ==
It combines landscape painting with literature, depicting a scene featuring Pandæmonium inspired by the 1667 poem Paradise Lost by John Milton. Reflecting the Romantic style of the era, Martin also produced engravings featuring a similar scene. It was displayed at the Royal Academy Exhibition of 1841 at the National Gallery in London. The painting is now in the collection of the Louvre in Paris, which acquired it in 2006.

A companion painting The Celestial City and the River of Bliss was also exhibited in 1841.

== See also ==
- Benjamin Hick
- Paradise Lost in popular culture

== Bibliography ==
- Bacon, Simon (ed.) Female Identity in Contemporary Fictional Purgatorial Worlds. Bloomsbury Academic, 2025.
- Boucanier, Thierry. Inferno L'art des ténèbres. Camion Blanc, 2021.
- Meisel, Martin. Realizations: Narrative, Pictorial, and Theatrical Arts in Nineteenth-Century England. Princeton University Press, 2014.
- Myrone, Martin. John Martin: Apocalypse. Tate Publishing, 2012.
