= An American Ship in Distress =

Painting by Thomas Birch

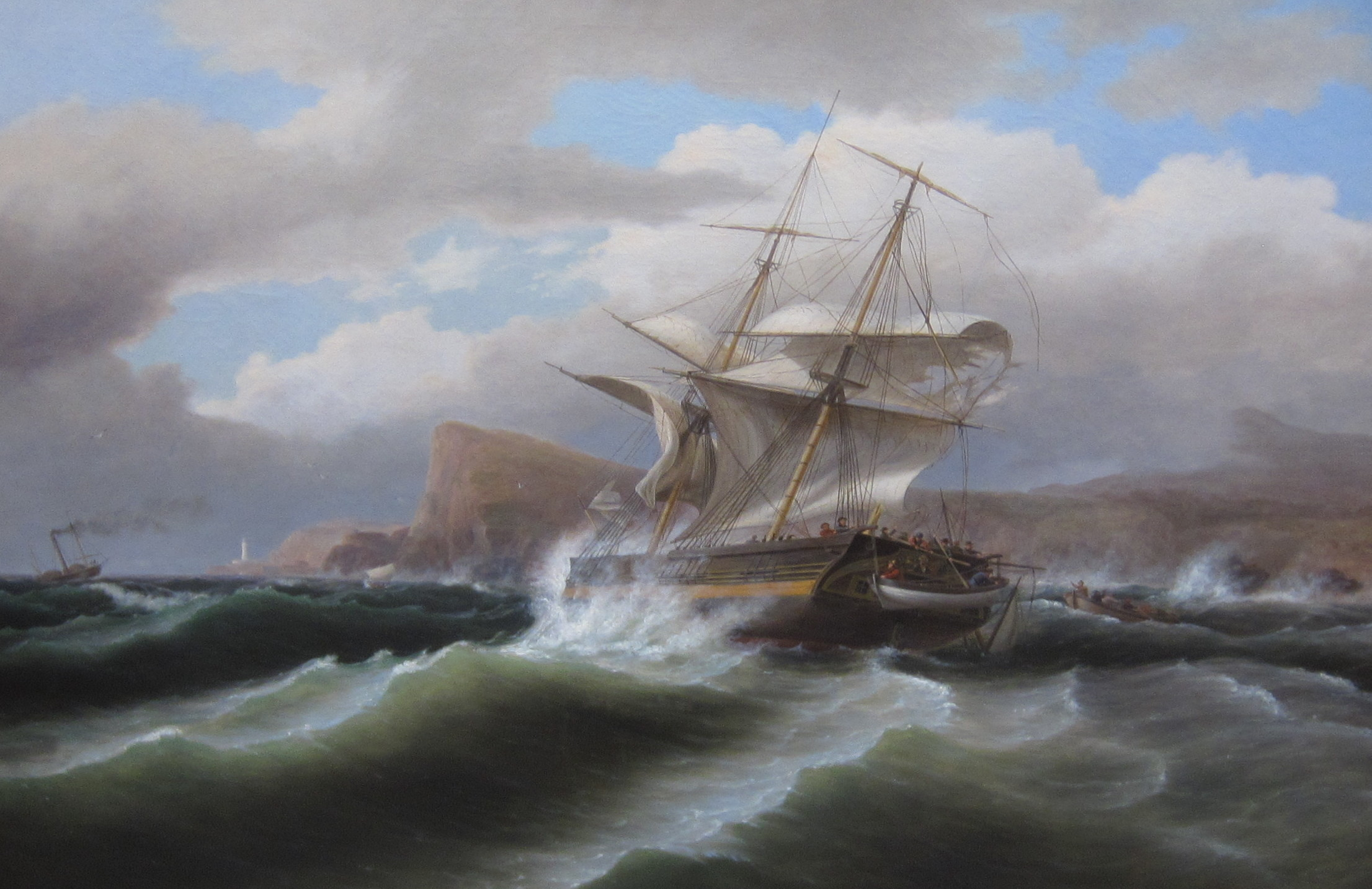
- Artist: Thomas Birch
- Year: 1841
- Medium: oil on canvas
- Dimensions: 91.4 cm × 136.5 cm (36.0 in × 53.7 in)
- Location: Timken Museum of Art, San Diego

An American Ship in Distress is an 1841 oil painting on canvas by Thomas Birch. It depicts an American sailing ship in a tempestuous sea.
