= Ludvig August Smith =

Danish painter

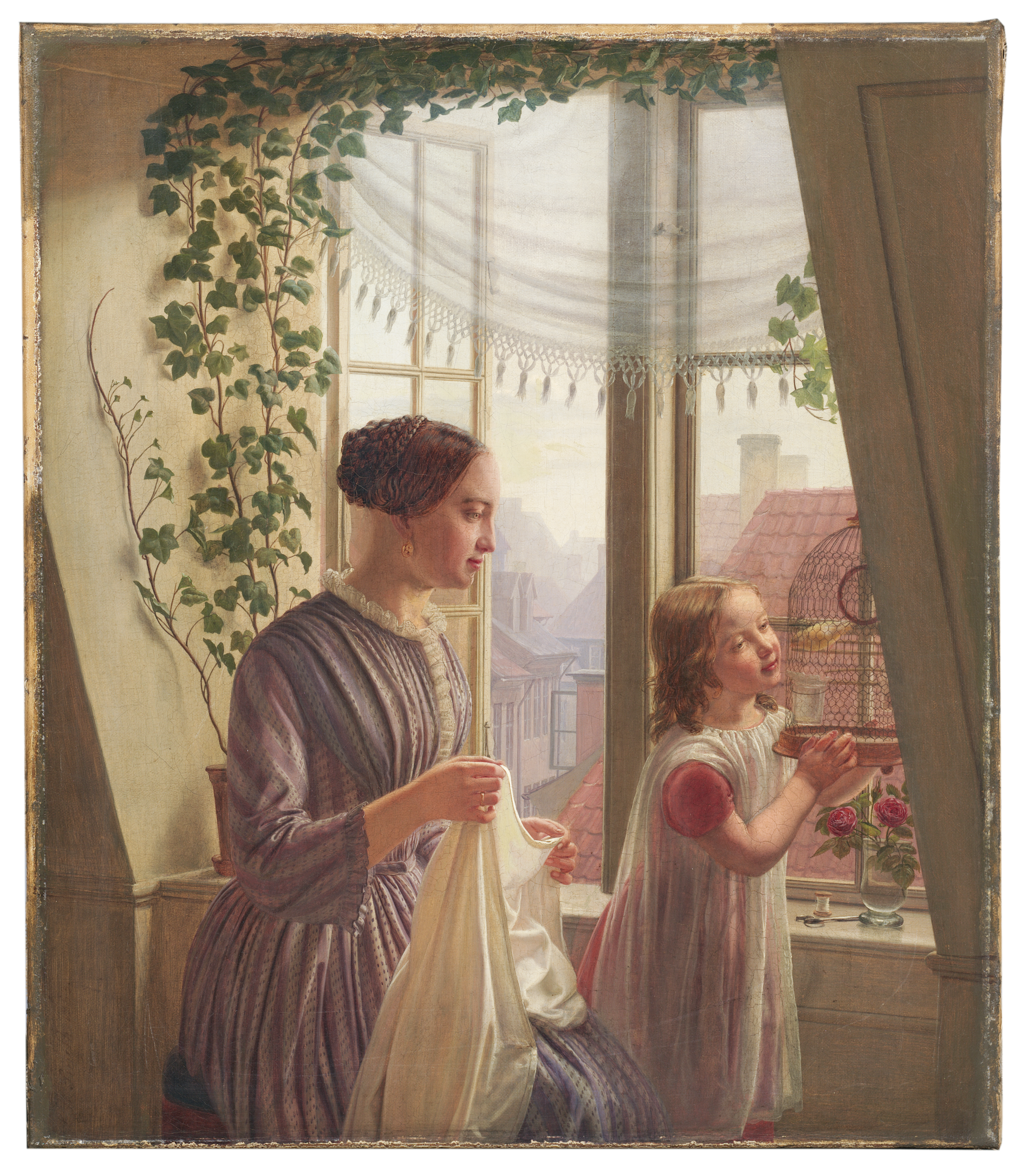
Interior with mother and daughter by the window by Ludvig August Smith, 1853, Nationalmuseum, Stockholm

Ludvig August Smith (22 November 1820 – 12 November 1906) was a Danish painter, specialising in genre painting but also producing portraits and history paintings.

Born in Copenhagen, he was the son of Morten Peter Smith (1776-1835) and Lene Dorothea (nee Scheel; 1780-1853). He studied at the Kunstakademiet from 1831 until 1841 and for a time painted there under C.W. Eckersberg. His first exhibition of a work, A Family Scene, came in 1839. His genre works included Supplicants (1853), bought by the Kunstforeningen. Particularly popular was his A Copenhagen Family (1861), popularised via a lithograph copy.

In 1864 he married Margrethe Petersen (1843-1877). He last exhibited in 1894 and died in Copenhagen.

A Woman Pleating her Hair, 1839, Nationalmuseum, Stockholm

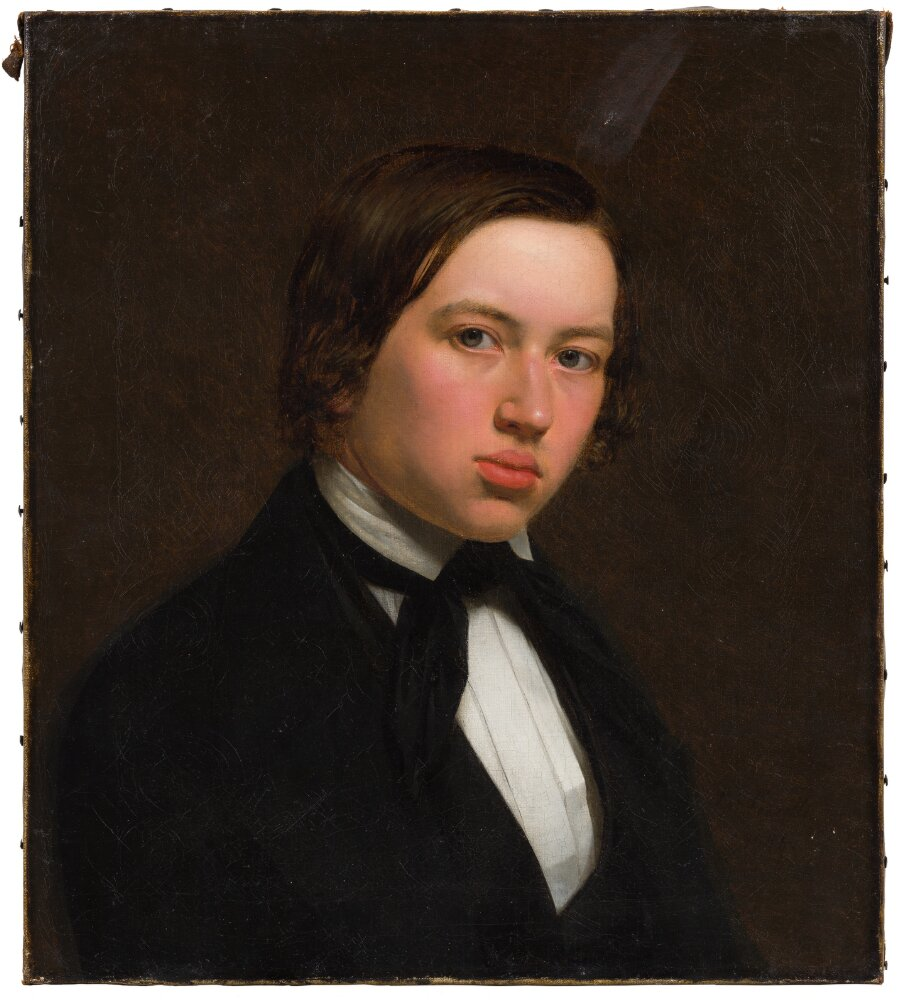
Portrait of a Man. Possibly a Self-Portrait, 1841, Nationalmuseum, Stockholm

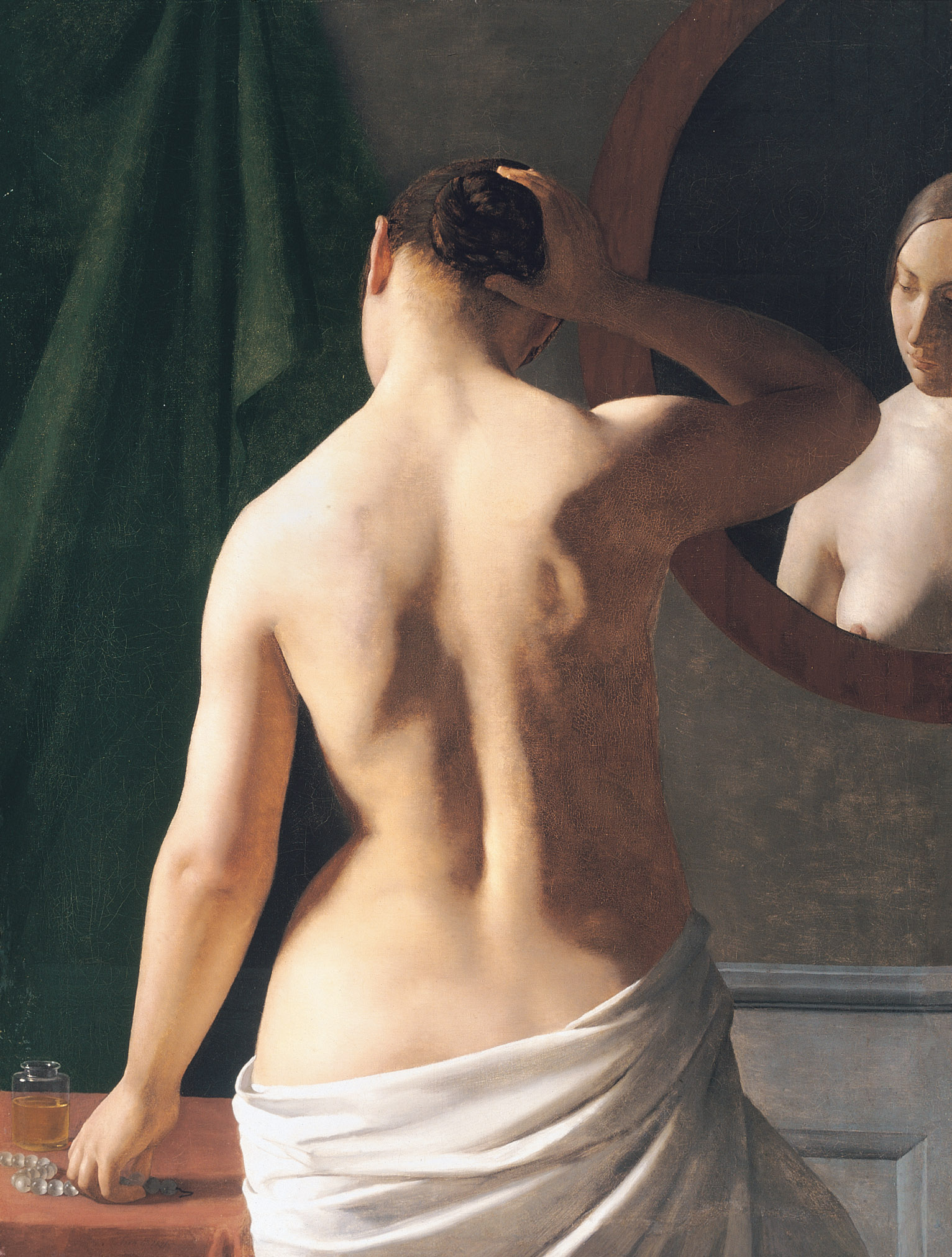
Female Model Before a Mirror, 1841, private collection
