= 1869 in art =

Events from the year 1869 in art.

== Events ==
- January 30 – New British magazine Vanity Fair publishes the first of a long series of colour lithographic caricatures of public figures, initially by Carlo Pellegrini, portraying Benjamin Disraeli.
- January 31 – The Société Libre des Beaux-Arts publishes its manifesto.
- May 3 – The Royal Academy Exhibition of 1869 opens in London, held for the first time at Burlington House
- July 30 – Vincent van Gogh starts his apprenticeship with the art dealers Goupil & Cie in The Hague (in which his uncle is a partner).
- December 4 – The weekly illustrated newspaper The Graphic is first published by engraver William Luson Thomas in London.

== Works ==
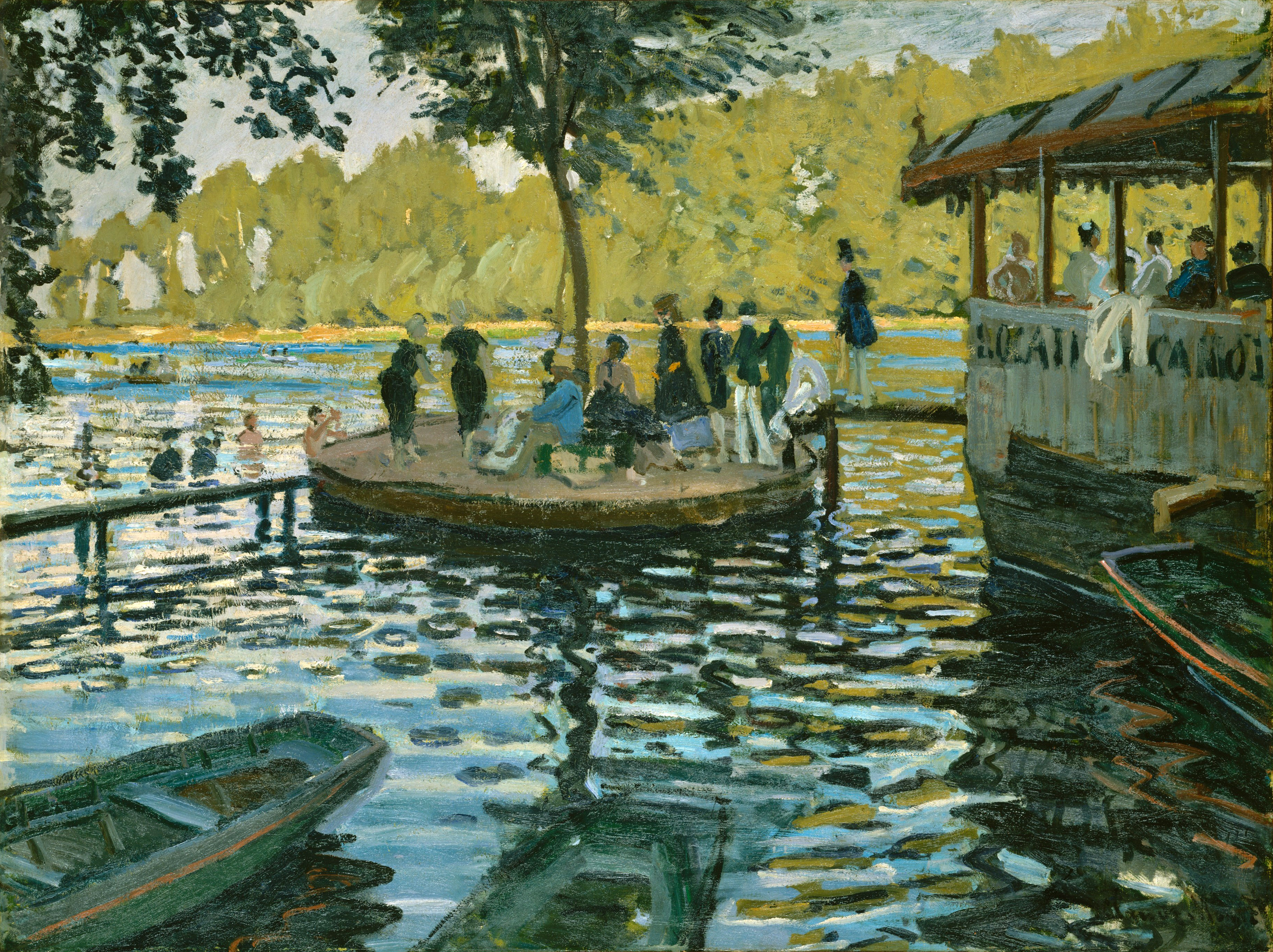
Monet – La Grenouillère

- Lawrence Alma-Tadema – The Wine Shop
- Thomas Armstrong – The Hay Field
- Peter Nicolai Arbo – Valkyrie
- Thomas Armstrong – The Hay Field
- Frédéric Bazille – Scène d'été
- Knud Bergslien – Birkebeiners on Skis Crossing the Mountain with the Royal Child
- Albert Bierstadt
  - Emigrants Crossing the Plains
  - Mount Hood
- William-Adolphe Bouguereau
  - The Elder Sister
  - The Knitting Girl
- Carolus-Duran – The Lady with the Glove
- Jean-Baptiste Carpeaux – La Danse (sculpture for Palais Garnier, Paris)
- Albert Charles Challen – Mary Seacole
- Jean-Baptiste-Camille Corot – Femme Lisant (Metropolitan Museum of Art, New York)
- Gustave Courbet
  - The Calm Sea, (Metropolitan Museum of Art)
  - The Cliff at Etretat after the Storm (Musée d'Orsay, Paris)
- Edgar Degas – Interior (Philadelphia Museum of Art)
- Lowes Cato Dickinson – Portrait of Goldsworthy Lowes Dickinson
- Gustave Doré – Andromeda
- Jean-Jules-Antoine Lecomte du Nouÿ – The supper of Beaucaire, 28 July 1793
- Luke Fildes – Houseless and Hungry (engraving for The Graphic)
- Atkinson Grimshaw – Autumn Glory: The Old Mill
- George P. A. Healy – Abraham Lincoln
- Jean-Jacques Henner – Woman on a Black Divan
- James Clarke Hook – Caught by the Tide
- Daniel Huntington – Sowing the Word
- Frederick Richard Lee – Morning in the Meadows
- Frederic Leighton – Daedalus and Icarus
- Daniel Maclise – King Cophetua and the Beggar Maid
- Édouard Manet
  - The Balcony (Musée d'Orsay, Paris)
  - Beach at Boulogne-sur-Mer (Private collection)
  - The Departure of the Folkestone Boat (Philadelphia Museum of Art)
  - The Execution of Emperor Maximilian (Kunsthalle Mannheim)
  - Moonlight over the Port of Boulogne (Musée d'Orsay, Paris)
  - The Reading (Musée d'Orsay, Paris)
  - Repose (Berthe Morisot) (Rhode Island School of Design Museum, Providence, Rhode Island)
- Claude Monet
  - Bathers at La Grenouillère
  - La Grenouillère
  - The Magpie
- Albert Joseph Moore
  - The Quartette
  - A Venus
- Gustave Moreau – Europa and the Bull
- Mihály Munkácsy – Last Day of a Condemned Man
- Erskine Nicol – A Nip Against the Cold
- Edward Poynter – Saint George for England (mosaic for Palace of Westminster)
- Thomas Stuart Smith – The Pipe of Freedom
- Thomas Thornycroft – Statue of Richard Grosvenor, Second Marquess of Westminster (marble, Grosvenor Park, Chester, England)
- James Tissot – Young Women Looking at Japanese Articles
- W. L. Wyllie – Dawn after a Storm

== Births ==
- January 15 – Stanisław Wyspiański, Polish playwright, painter and designer (died 1907)
- February 7 – Xavier Martínez, Mexican-born American painter (died 1943)
- February 10 – Royal Cortissoz, American art critic (died 1948)
- March 1 – Pietro Canonica, Italian sculptor (died 1959)
- March 19 – Józef Mehoffer, Polish painter and decorative artist (died 1946)
- April 6
  - Marc-Aurèle de Foy Suzor-Coté, Canadian painter and sculptor (died 1937)
  - Louis Raemaekers, Dutch painter and cartoonist (died 1956)
- April 11 – Maximilian Liebenwein, Austrian painter and illustrator (died 1926)
- June 7 – Lamorna Birch, born Samuel John Birch, English painter (died 1955)
- June 21 – Zaida Ben-Yusuf, born Esther Zeghdda Ben Youseph Nathan, English-born American portrait photographer (died 1933)
- June 27 – Kate Carew, born Mary Williams, American caricaturist (died 1961)
- July 20 – Charles Pillet, French sculptor and engraver (died 1960)
- October 14 – Joseph Duveen, English art dealer (died 1939)
- October 22 – August Gaul, German sculptor (died 1922)
- November 21 – Zaida Ben-Yusuf, English-born American portrait photographer (died 1933)
- December 1 – Eligiusz Niewiadomski, Polish painter, critic and assassin (executed 1923)
- December 18 – Edward Willis Redfield, American impressionist landscape painter (died 1965)
- December 31 – Henri Matisse, French painter (died 1954)
- date unknown – William Lee Hankey, English painter and illustrator (died 1952)

== Deaths ==
- January 8 – Paul Huet, French painter (born 1803)
- June 10 – Frederick Yeates Hurlstone, English painter (born 1800)
- July 4
  - Johann Friedrich Overbeck, German painter (born 1789)
  - Édouard Pingret, French painter and lithographer (born 1785)
- July 10 – Jan Wnęk, Polish carpenter and sculptor (aviation accident) (born 1828)
- August 26 – Baron Leys, Belgian painter (born 1815)
- August 8 – Roger Fenton, English photographer (born 1819)
- October 12 – François-Joseph Navez, Belgian neo-classical painter (born 1787)
- November 22 – William Hamlin, American engraver, first engraver for the state of Rhode Island (born 1772)
- December – Thomas Stuart Smith, Scottish painter (born 1815)
- December 8 – Samuel Jackson, English topographical painter, "father" of the Bristol School of painters (born 1794)
- December 29 – William Essex, English enamel-painter (born 1784)
- date unknown
  - Giuseppe Bisi, Italian painter, mainly of landscapes (born 1787)
  - Louis-Henri Brévière, French wood-engraver (born 1797)
