= The Birthday (painting) =

Painting by William Holman Hunt

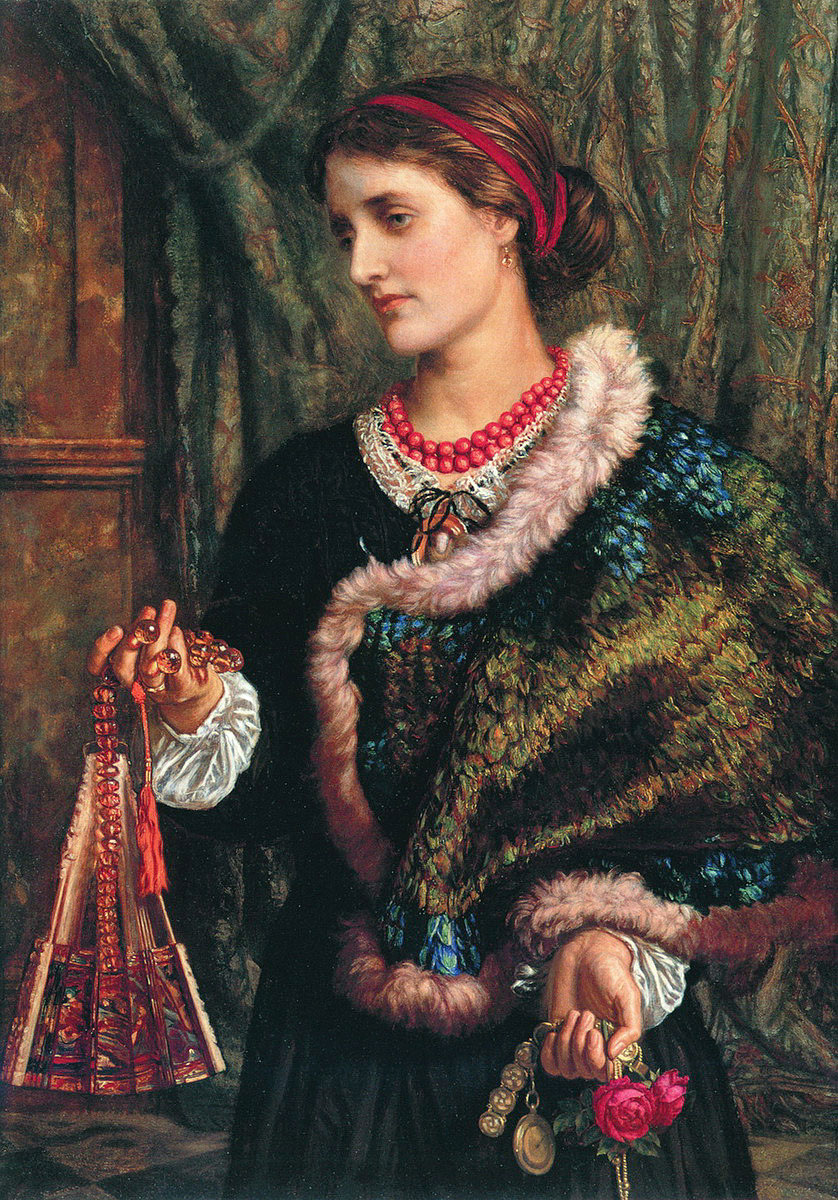
- Artist: William Holman Hunt
- Year: 1868
- Type: Oil on canvas, portrait painting
- Dimensions: 102.9 cm × 72.7 cm (40.5 in × 28.6 in)
- Location: Legion of Honor, San Francisco

The Birthday is an 1868 oil painting by the British artist William Holman Hunt. It is a portrait of the artist's future second wife Edith, who was also the younger sister of his first wife who had died two years earlier. It commemorates Edith's twenty-first birthday.

Holman Hunt was a noted member of the Pre-Raphaelite Brotherhood. The painting was displayed at the Royal Academy Exhibition of 1869 held at Burlington House in London. Today it is part of the collection of the Legion of Honor in San Francisco, which acquired it in 2019.

== Bibliography ==
- Amor, Anne Clark. William Holman Hunt: The True Pre-Raphaelite. Constable, 1989.
- Lochnan, Katharine Aileen (ed.) Holman Hunt and the Pre-Raphaelite Vision. Art Gallery of Toronto, 2008.
- Pointon, Marcia R. Brilliant Effects: A Cultural History of Gem Stones and Jewellery. Paul Mellon Centre for Studies in British Art, 2009.
