= A Venus =

Painting by Albert Joseph Moore

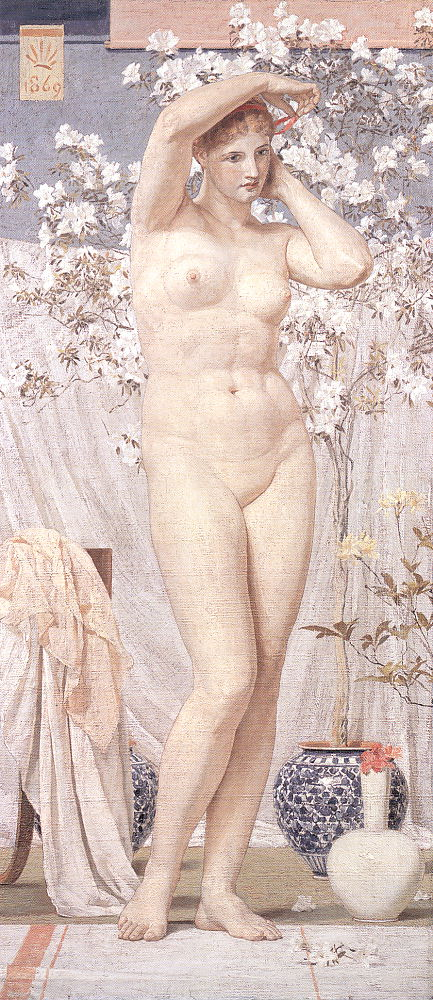
- Artist: Albert Joseph Moore
- Year: 1869
- Type: Oil on canvas, nude art
- Dimensions: 160 cm × 76.2 cm (63 in × 30.0 in)
- Location: York Art Gallery, Yorkshire

A Venus is an 1869 oil painting by the British artist Albert Joseph Moore. A nude, it features a young woman in Ancient Rome. In its lack of any clear narrative it typifies the "art for art's" concept of the Aesthetic Movement of which of which Moore was a prominent member. It was commissioned by the art collectorFrederick Richards Leyland who already owned Frederic Leighton's Venus Disrobing for the Bath.

The painting was displayed at the Royal Academy Exhibition of 1869 held at Burlington House in London. It is now part of the collection of York Art Gallery in the Artist's native city, which acquired it in 1954.

== Bibliography ==
- Lonhart, Nancy Elizabeth. Albert Moore: An Art for Art's Sake Visionary University of California, 1987.
- Smith, Alison. The Victorian Nude: Sexuality, Morality, and Art. Manchester University Press, 1996.
