= Royal Academy Exhibition of 1869 =

1869 art exhibition in London

The Billiard Room by Henry Nelson O'Neil

The Royal Academy Exhibition of 1869 was the hundred and first annual Summer Exhibition of the British Royal Academy of Arts. It took place between at Burlington House in London between 3 May and 31 July 1869 during the Victorian era and was considered a success, attracting more than three hundred thousand visitors.

This was the first year the exhibition was held at Burlington House in Piccadilly, following the move from the academy's former home at the National Gallery if was also celebrated as the centenary of the inaugural Royal Academy Exhibition of 1769. It was opened by Queen Victoria as was traditional. The new rooms designed by architect Sydney Smirke were widely praised.

Amongst the works on display were several from artists associated with the Pre-Raphaelite Brotherhood, including John Everett Millais. His portrait of Nina, the daughter of Frederick Lehmann, attracted wide praise. Francis Grant, who had been elected President of the Royal Academy three years earlier, submitted portraits of High Society figures. Edwin Landseer, a specialist in animal paintings, sent in several works including The Swannery Invaded by Sea Eagles produced towards the end of his career.

The French artist Rosa Bonheur featured two paintings of sheep in Scotland and the Pyrenees respectively while Jean-Baptiste-Camille Corot submitted a landscape. Daniel Maclise displayed King Cophetua and the Beggar Maid, his penultimate work sent in to the academy.

== Gallery ==
Nell Gwynn by William Powell Frith

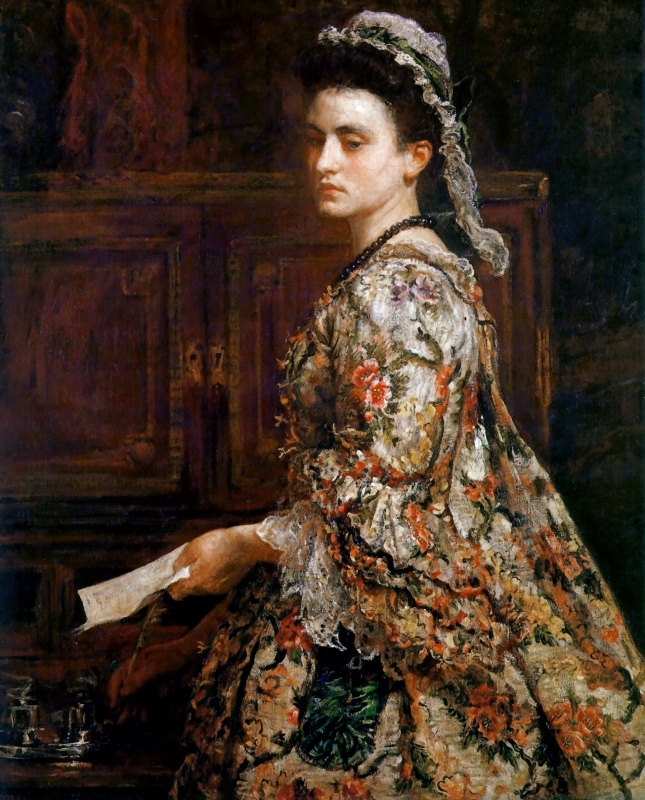
Vanessa by John Everett Millais

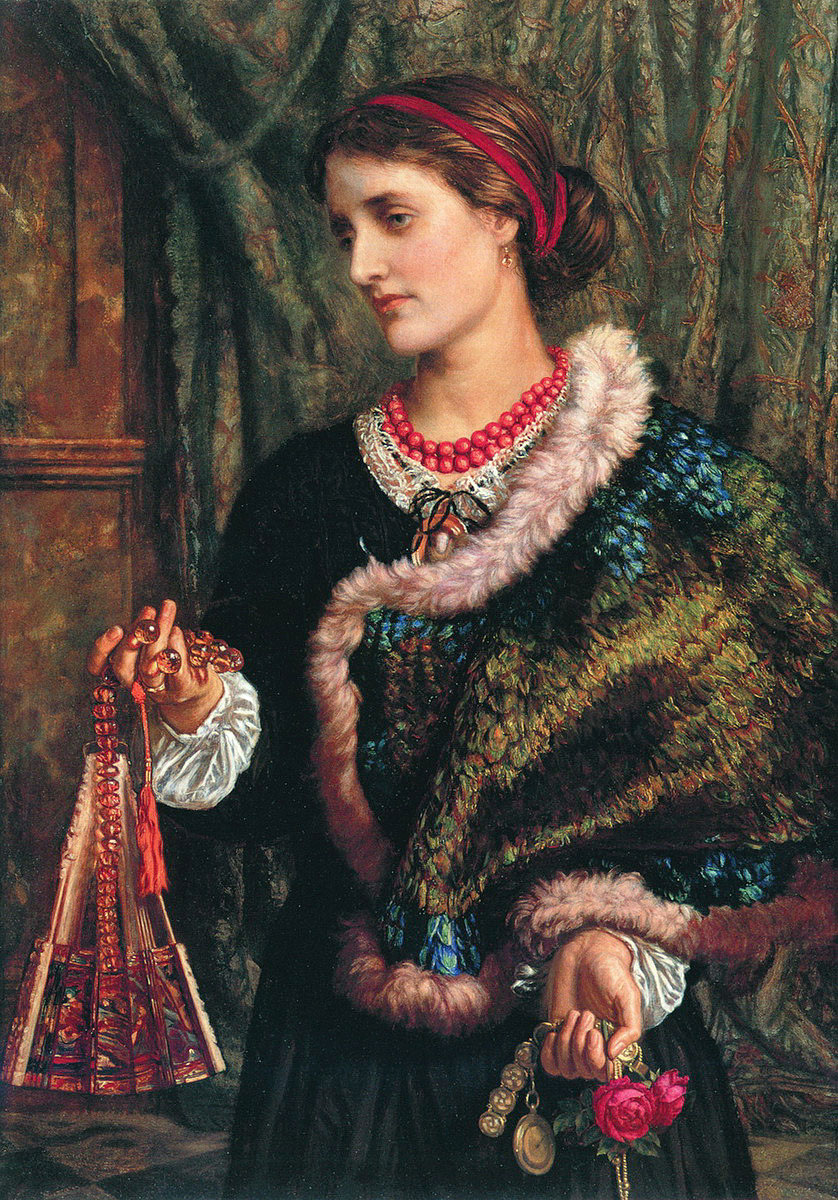
The Birthday by William Holman Hunt

The Swannery Invaded by Sea Eagles by Edwin Landseer

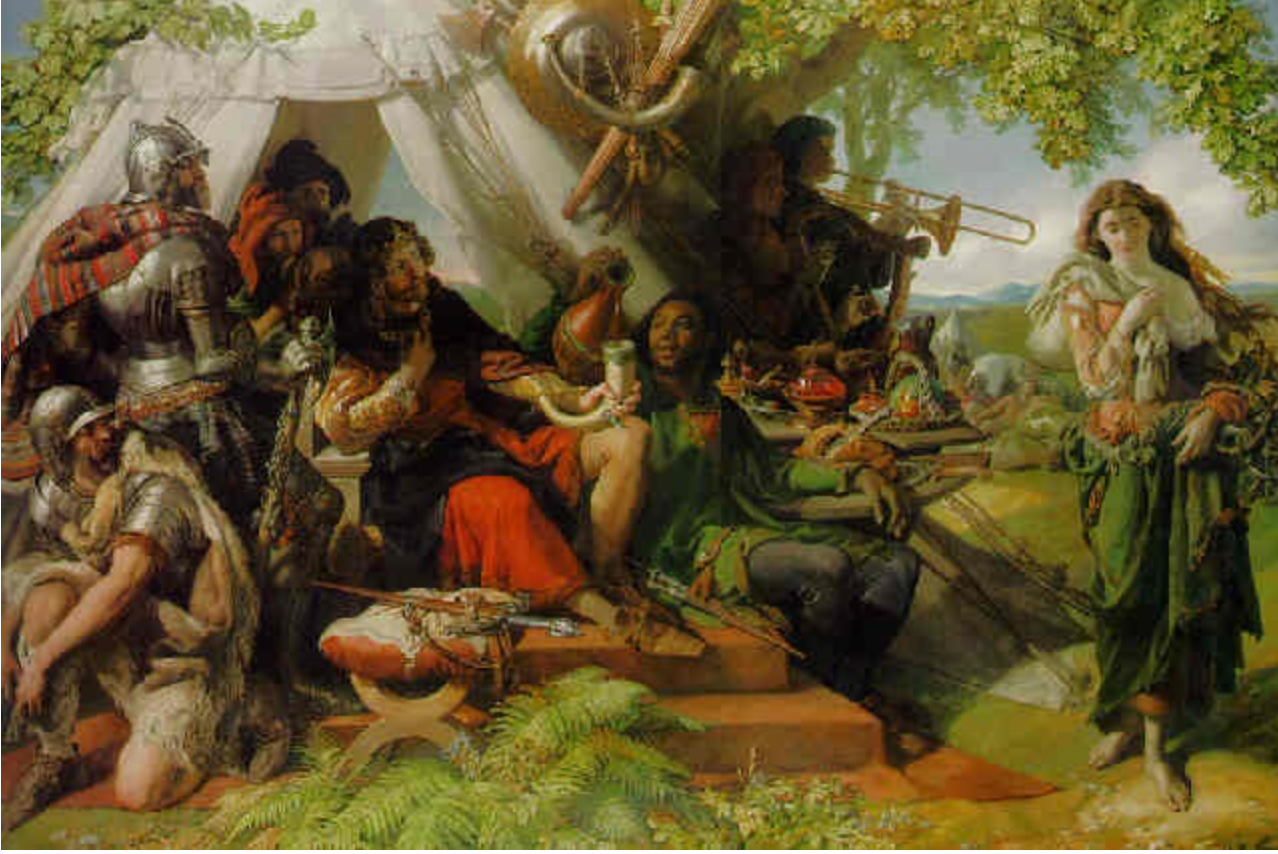
King Cophetua and the Beggar Maid by Daniel Maclise

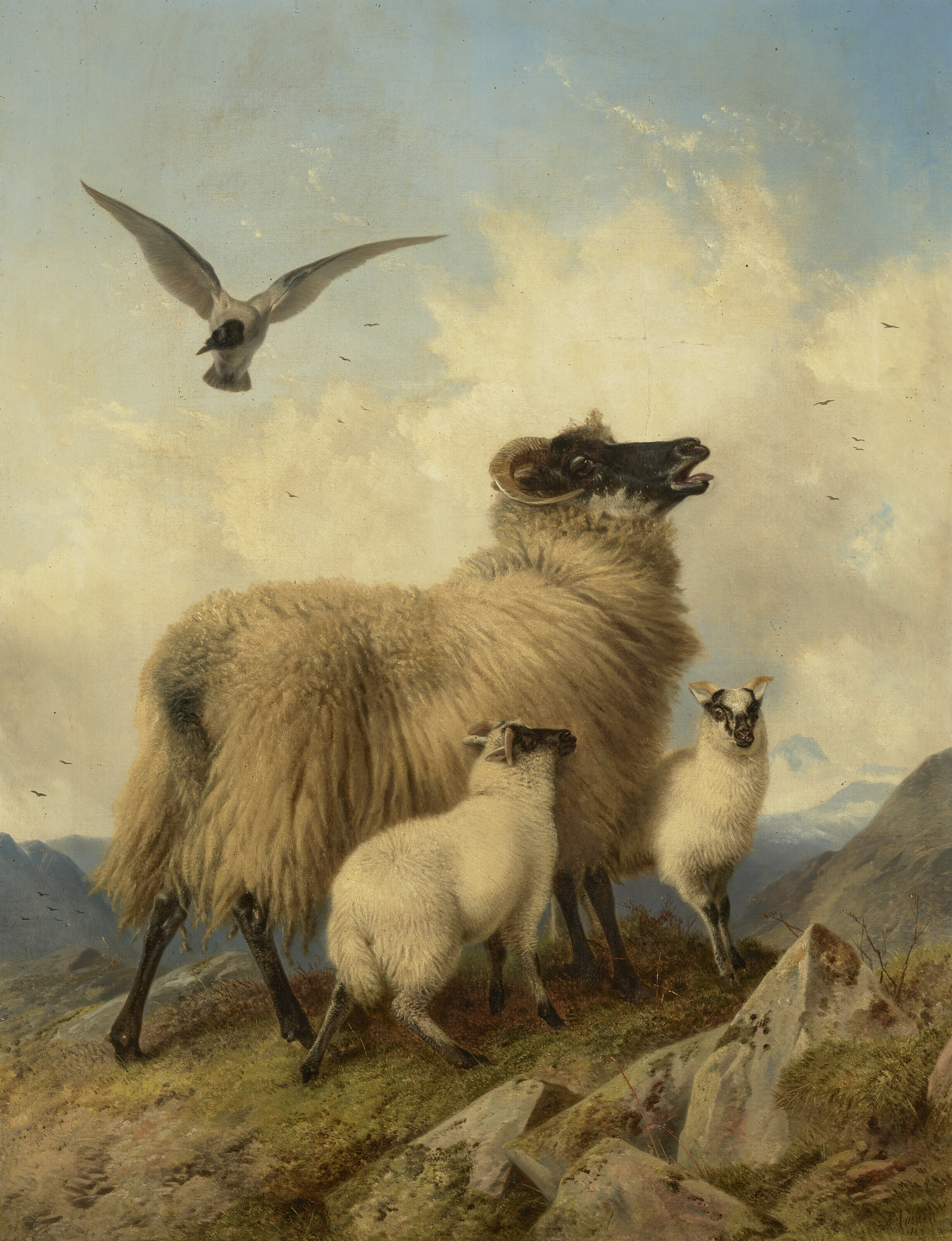
An Unwelcome Visitor by Richard Ansdell

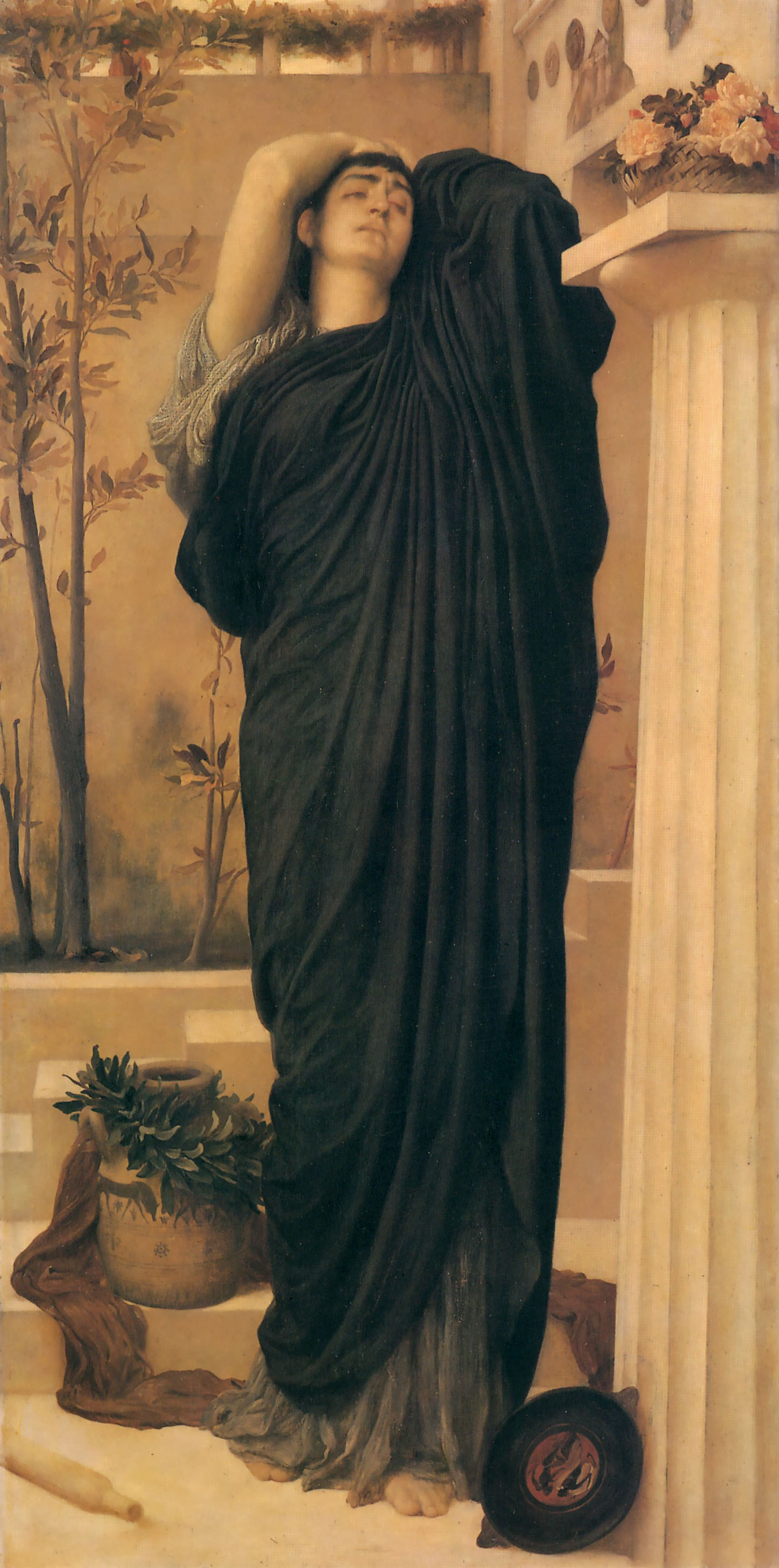
Electra at the Tomb of Agamemnon by Frederic Leighton

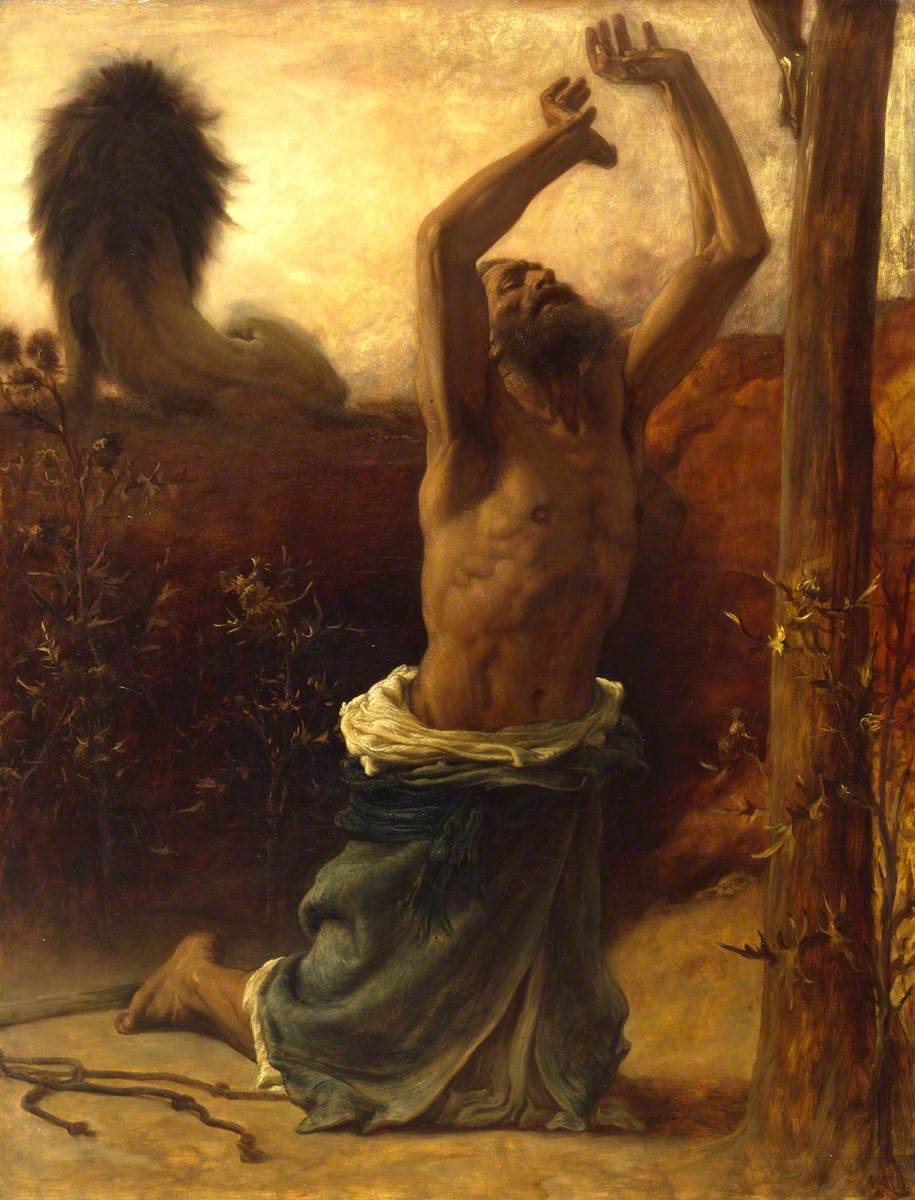
Saint Jerome by Frederic Leighton

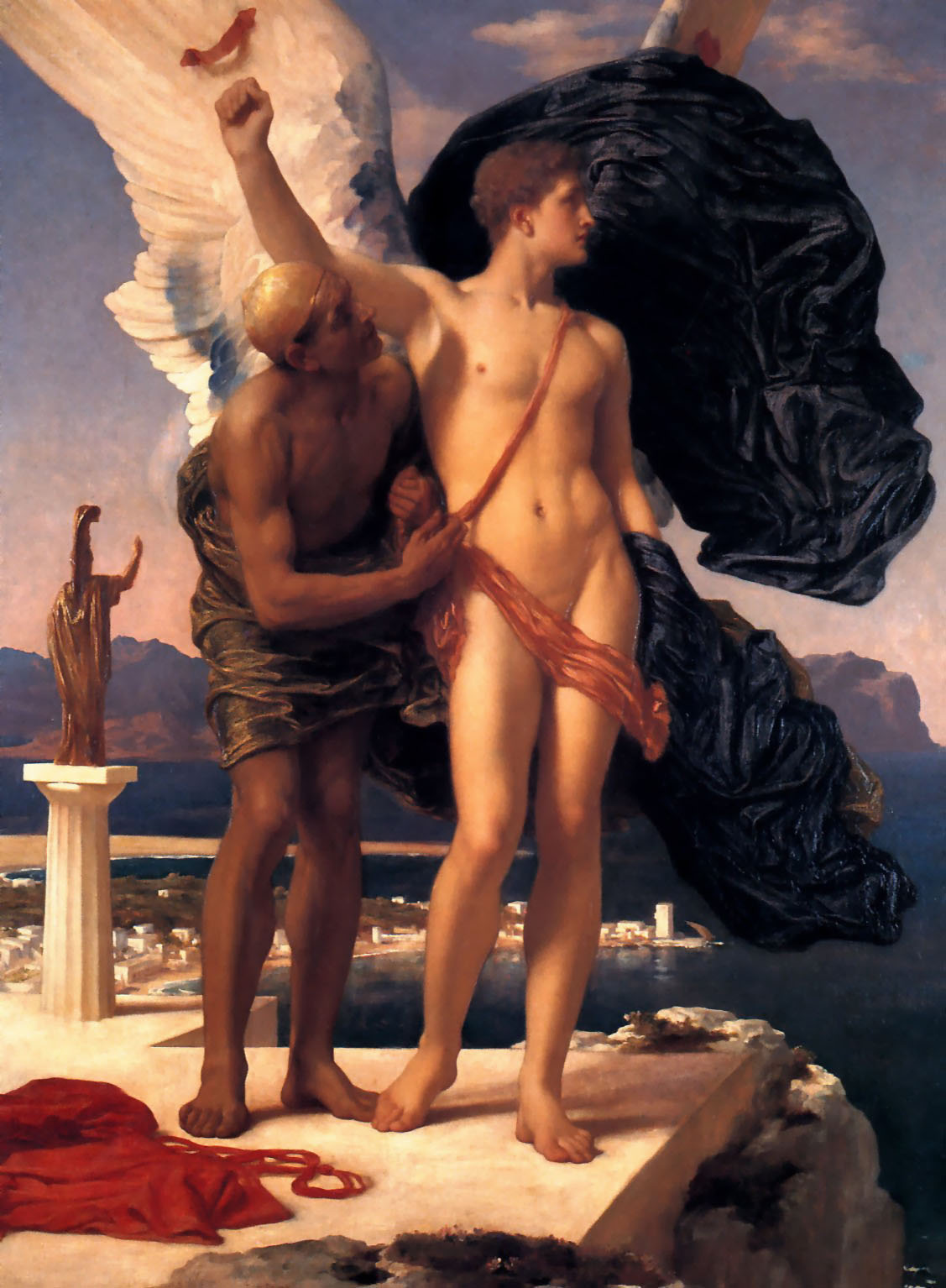
Icarus and Daedalus by Frederic Leighton

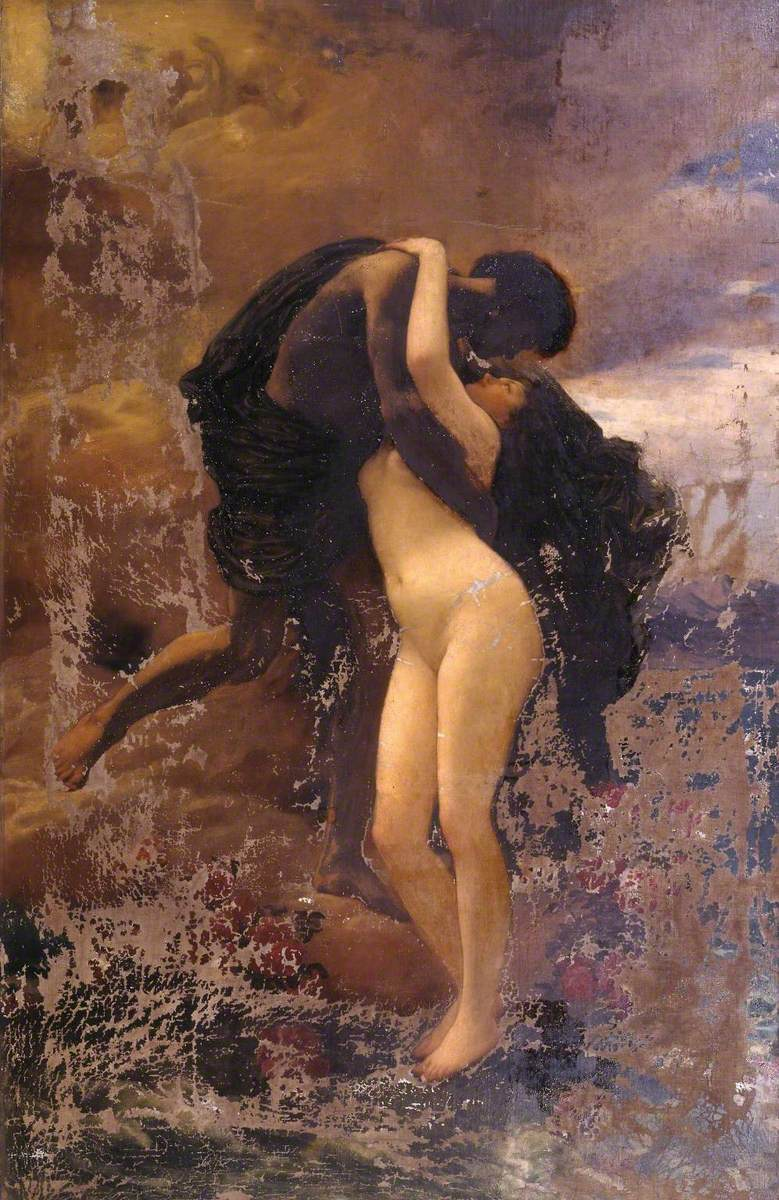
Helios and Rhodes by Frederic Leighton

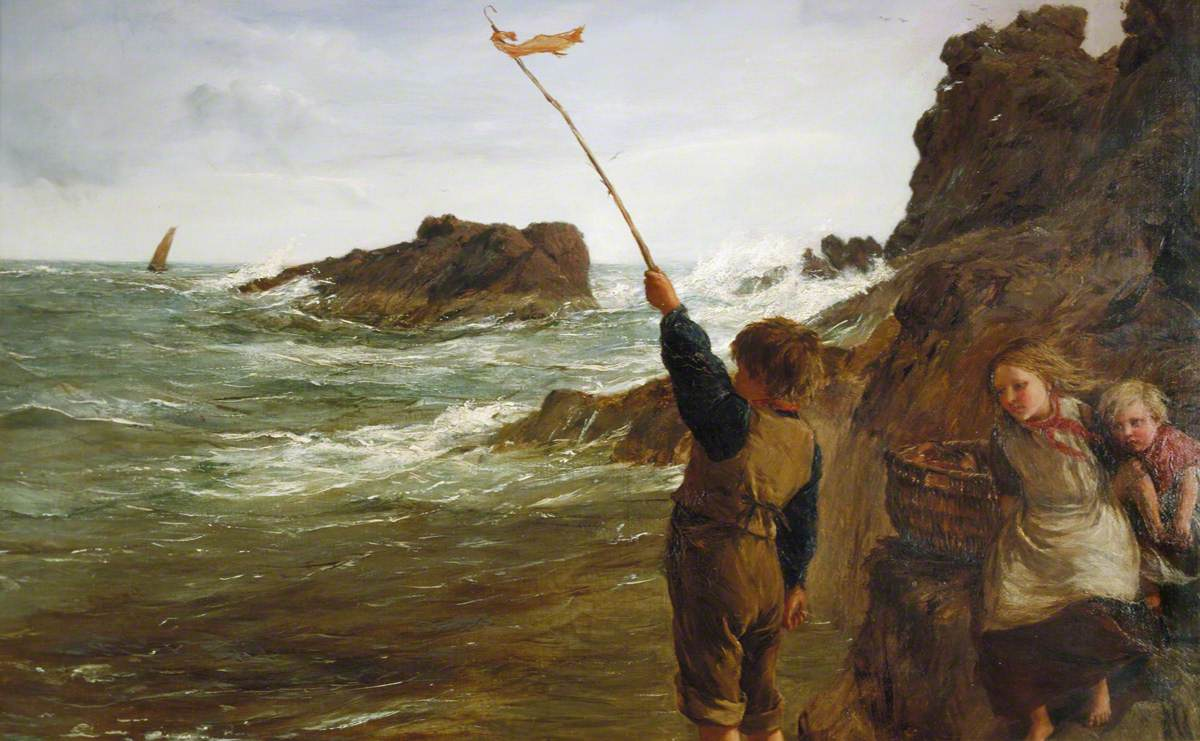
Caught by the Tide by James Clarke Hook

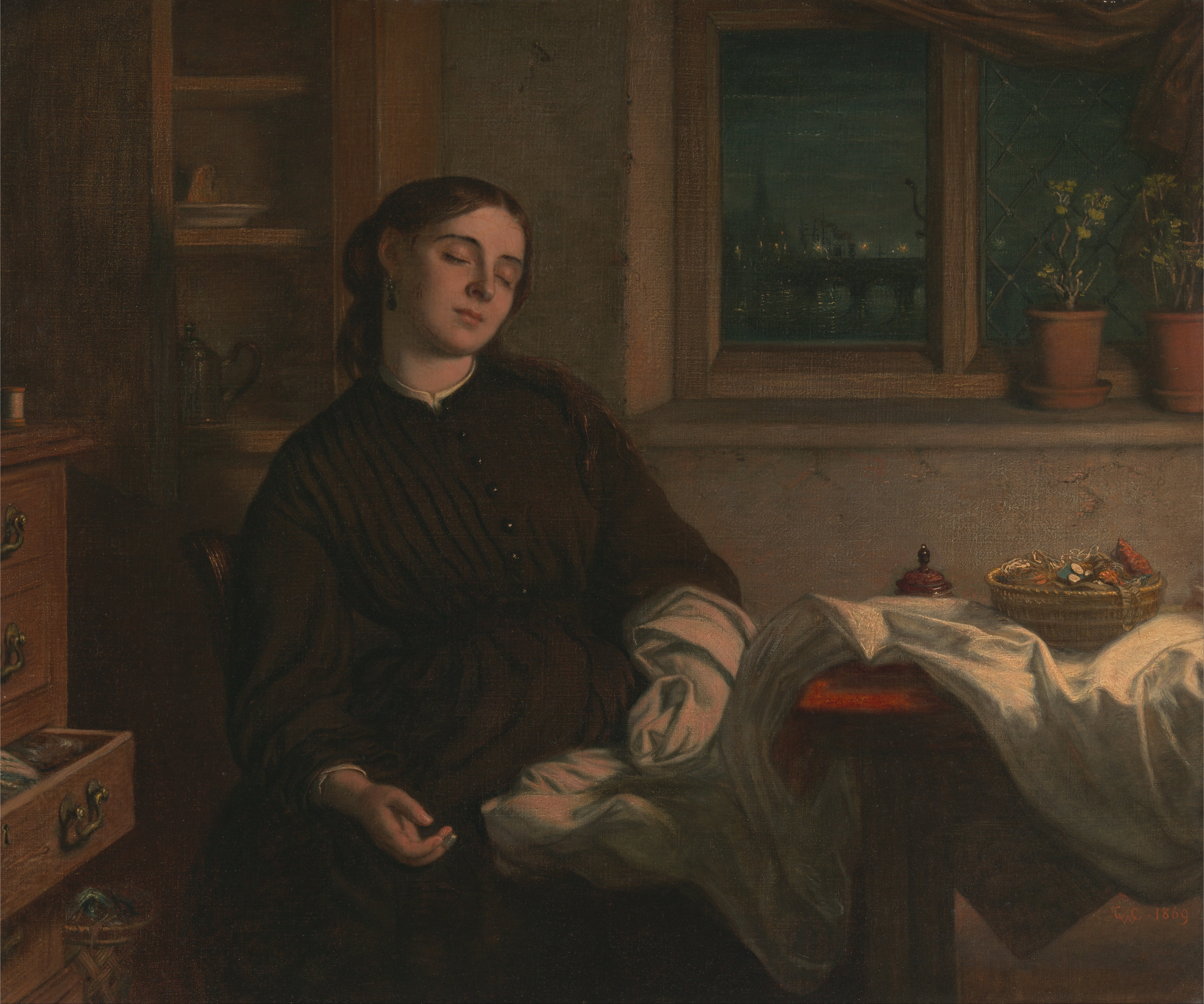
Home Dreams by Charles West Cope

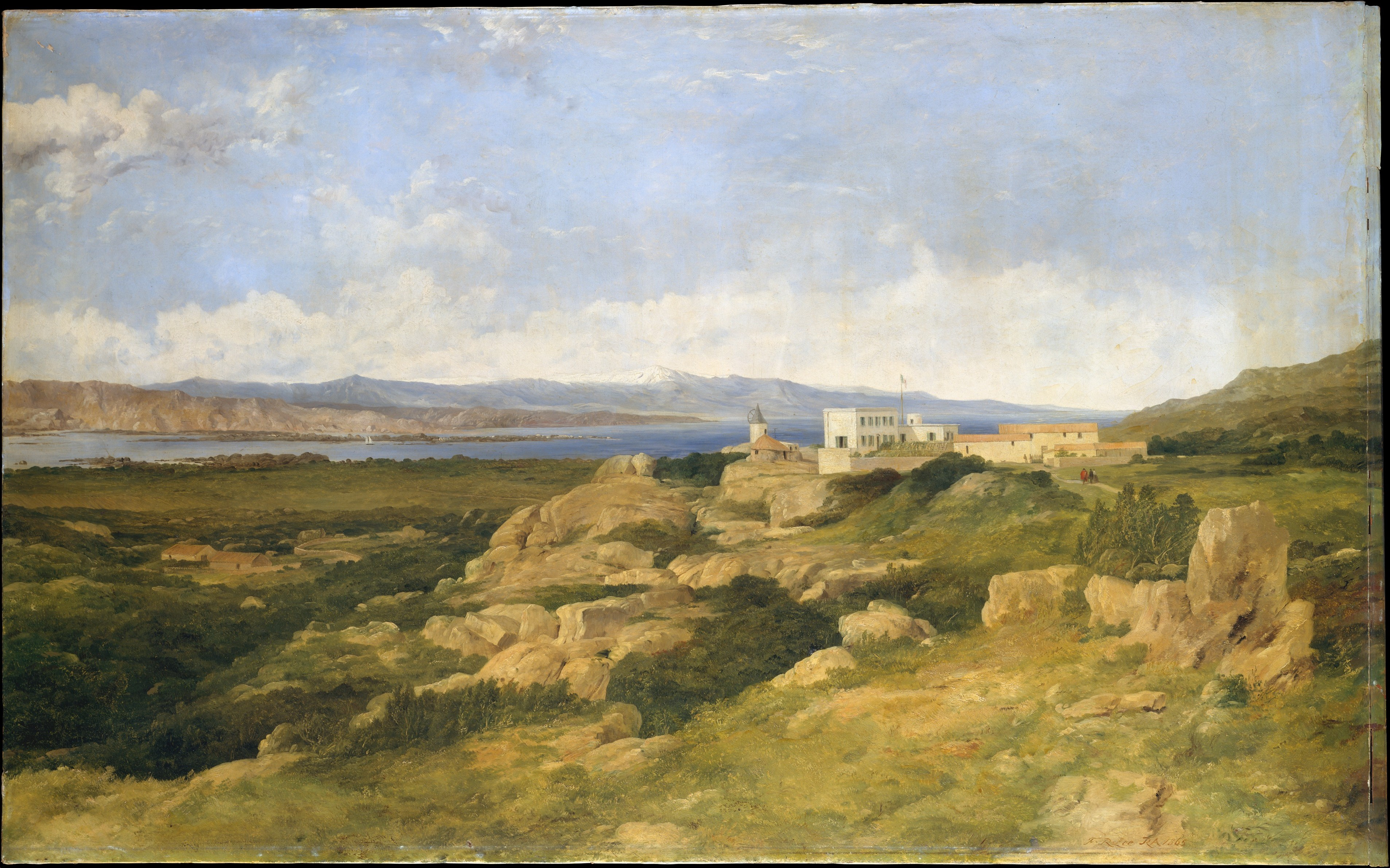
Garibaldi's Residence at Caprera by Frederick Richard Lee

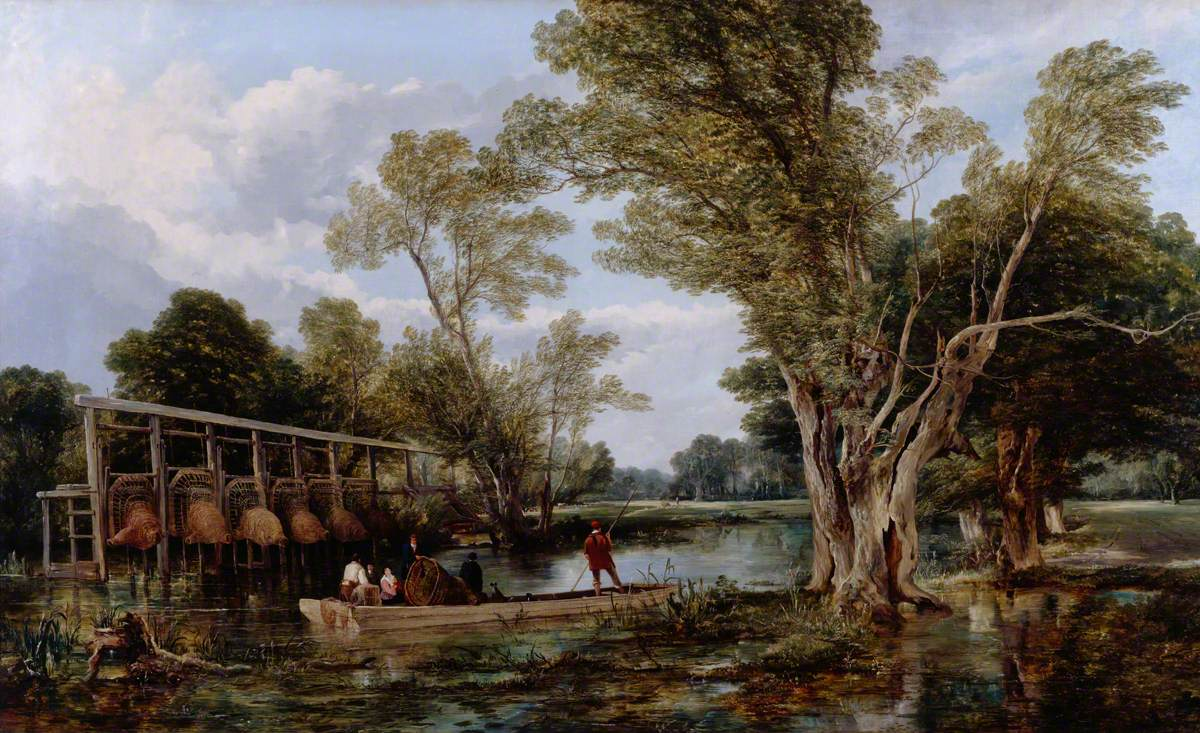
Morning in the Meadows by Frederick Richard Lee

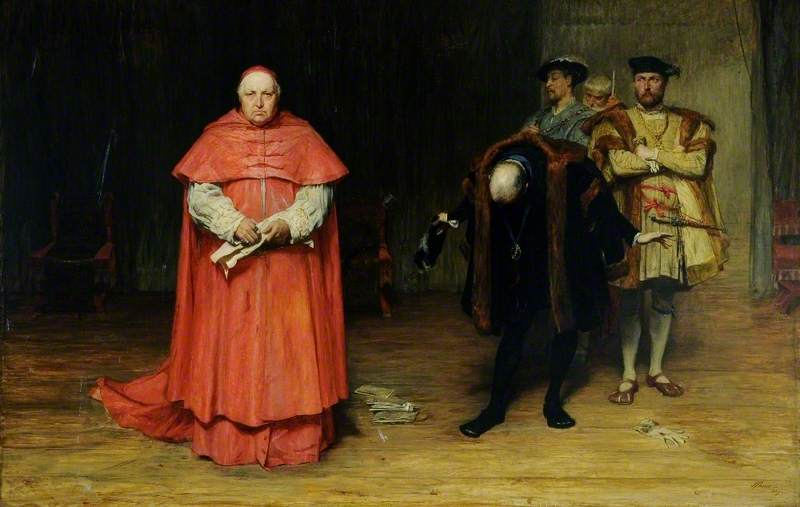
The Disgrace of Cardinal Wolsey by John Pettie

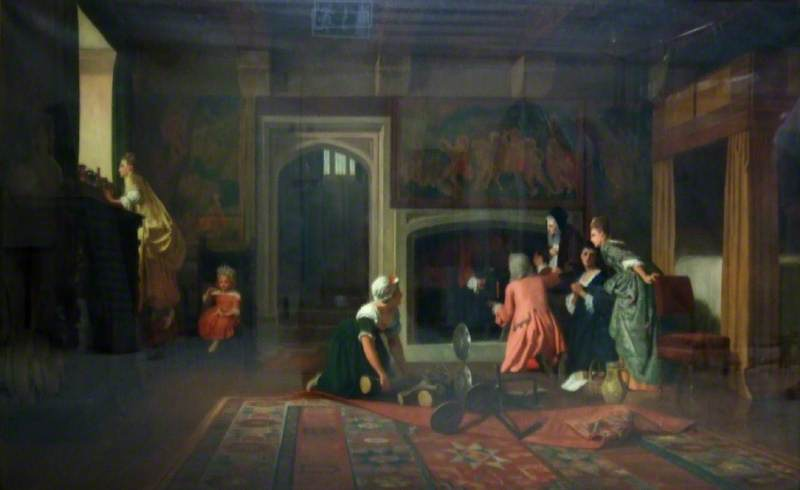
The Fugitive Jacobite by William Frederick Yeames

Luther's First Study of the Bible by Edward Matthew Ward

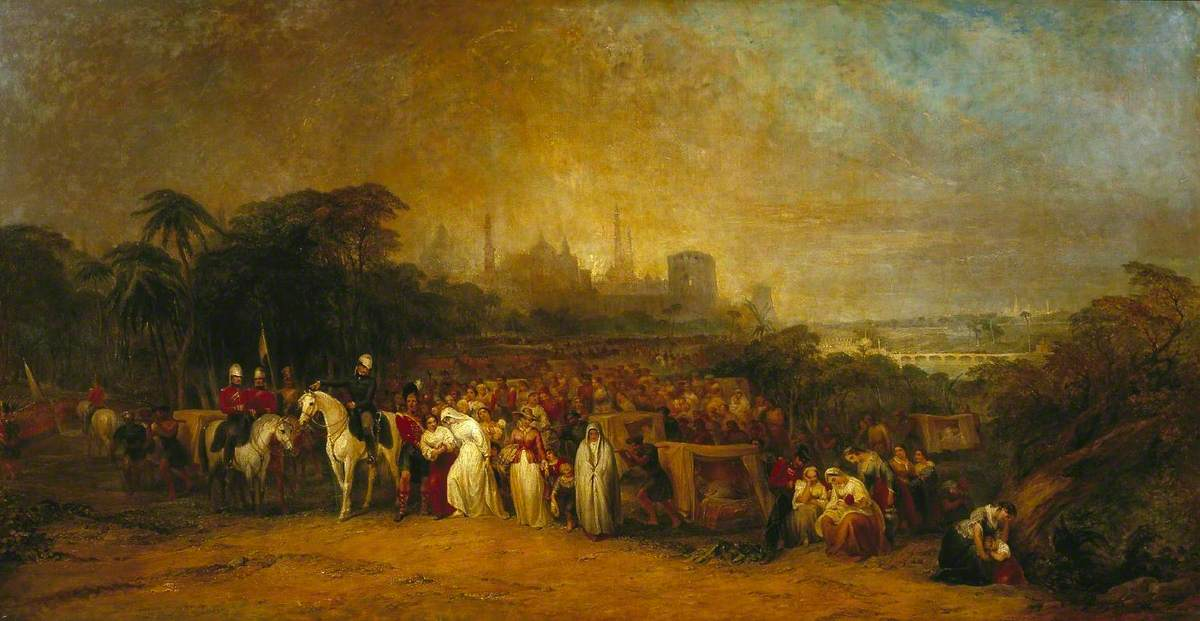
The Sufferers Besieged at Lucknow by George Jones

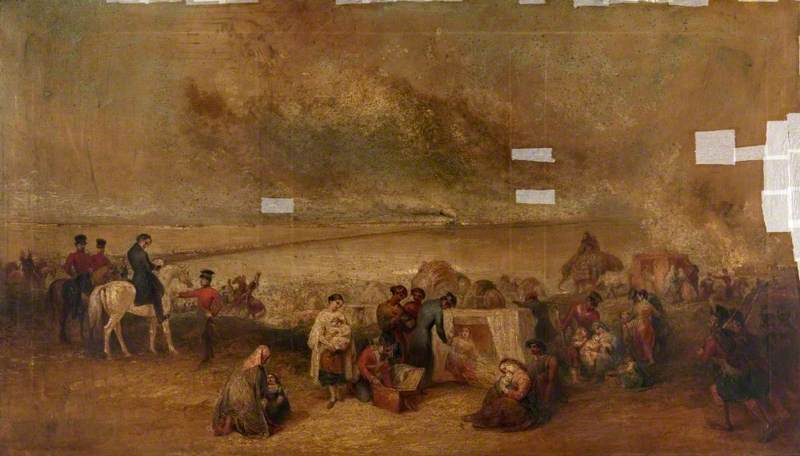
Cawnpore, Passage of the Ganges by George Jones

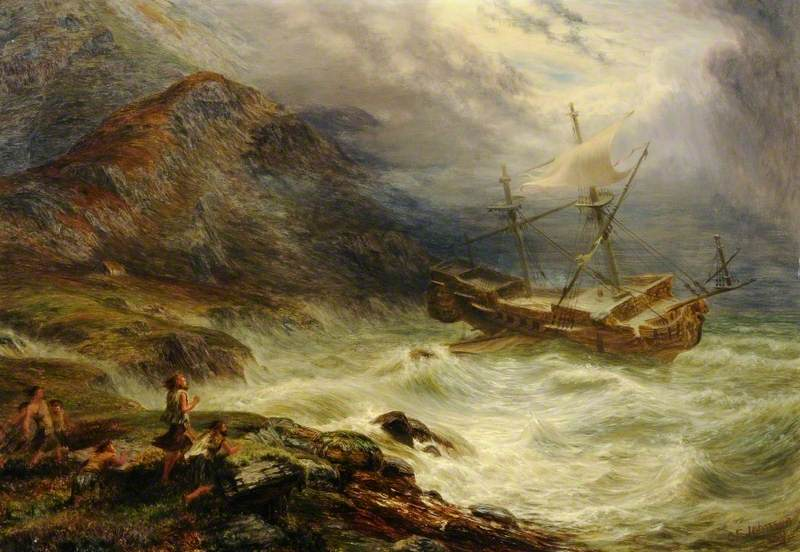
The Last of the Spanish Armada by Charles Edward Johnson

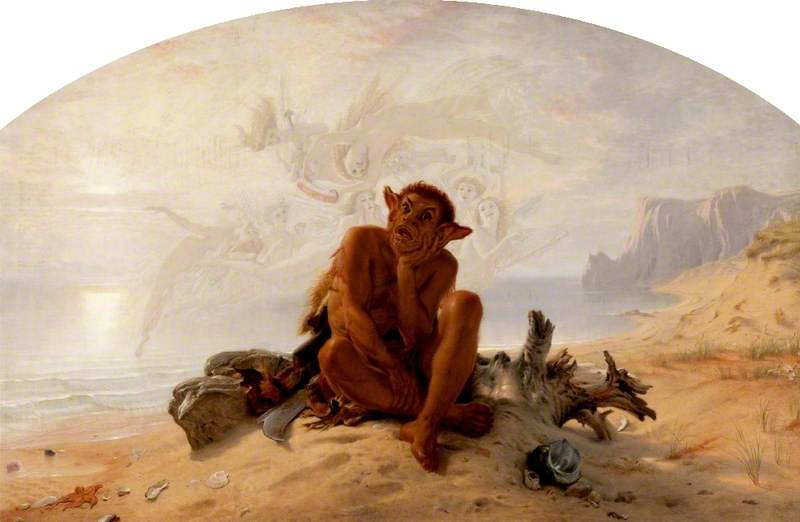
Caliban by Joseph Noel Paton

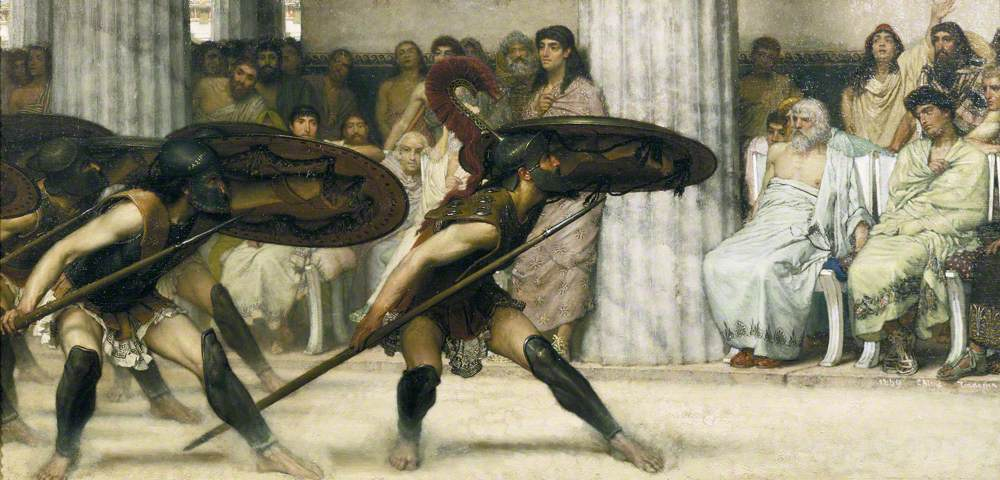
A Pyrrhic Dance by Lawrence Alma-Tadema

Coming Out of the Mist by Richard Ansdell

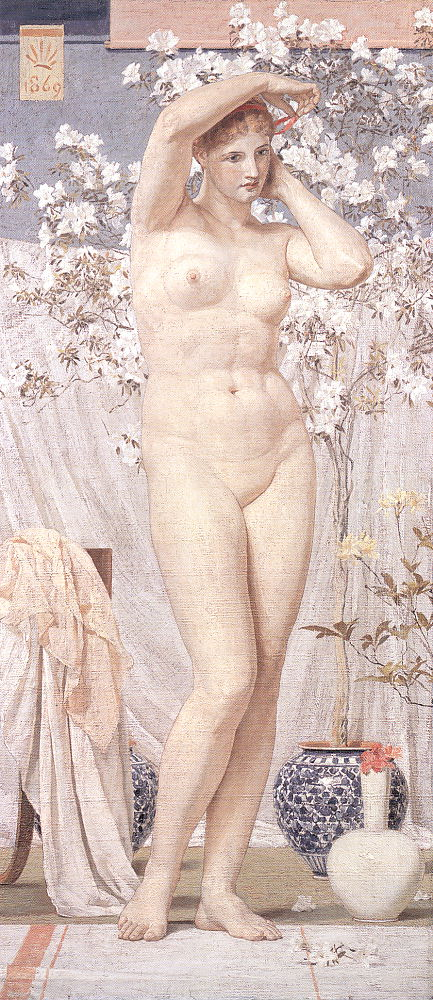
A Venus by Albert Joseph Moore

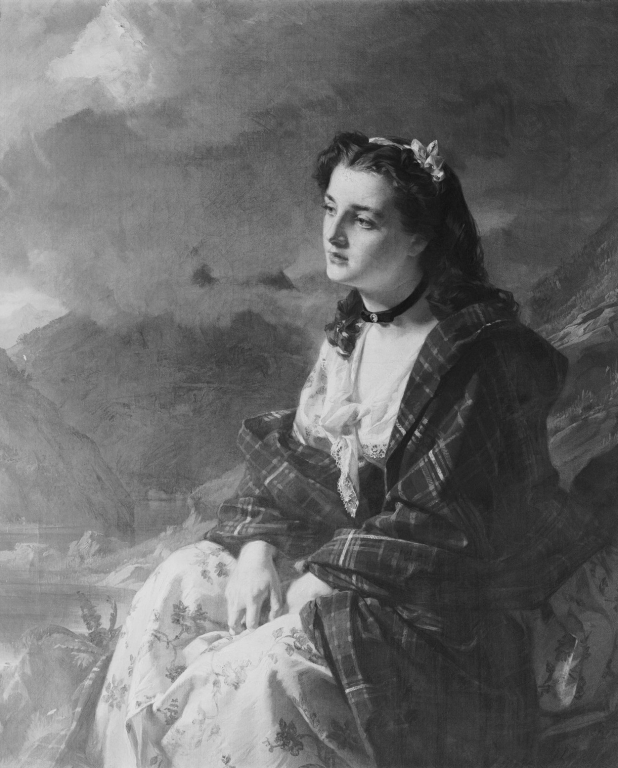
Flora Macdonald by Alexander Johnston

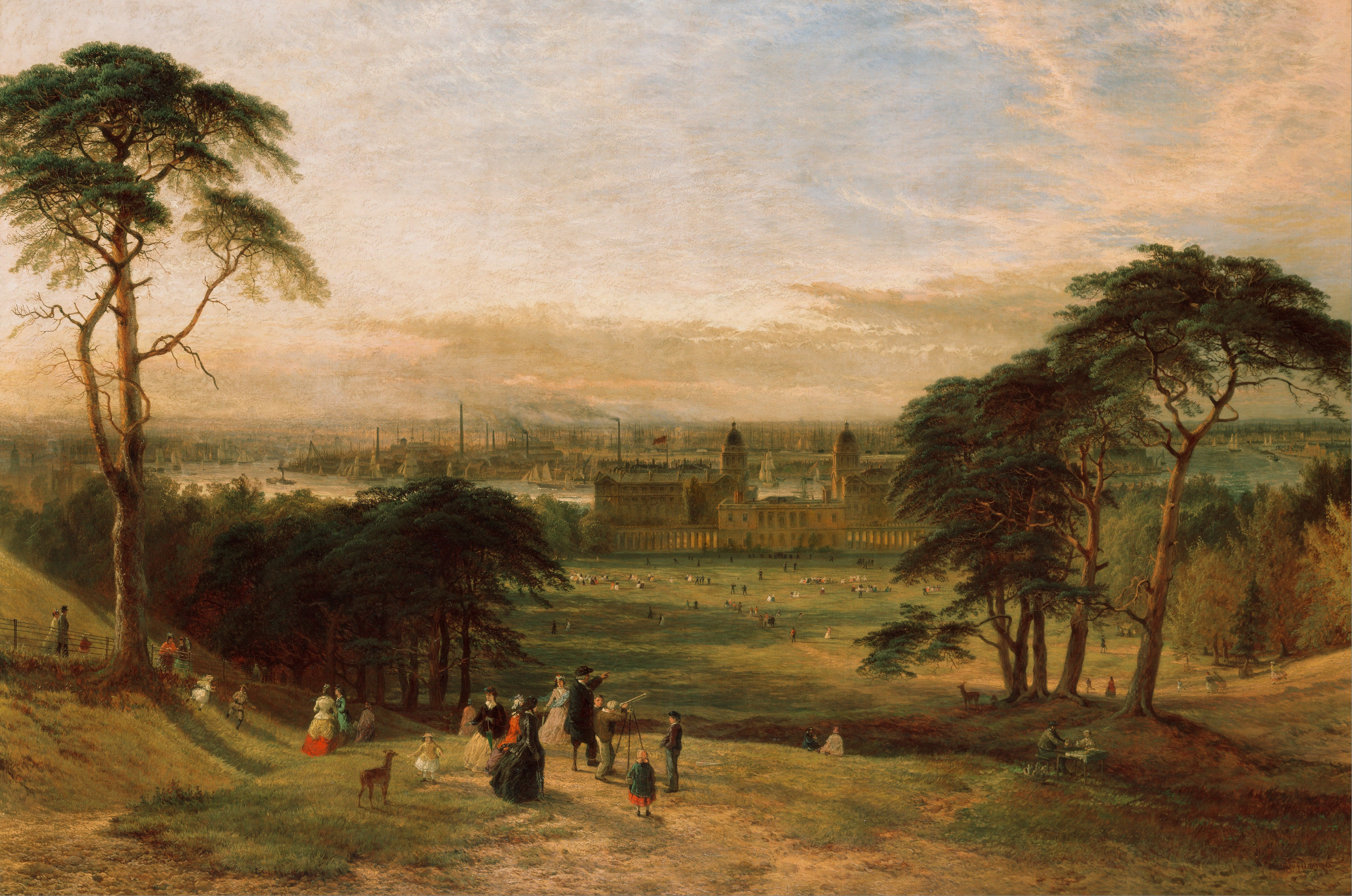
London from Greenwich Hill by Henry Dawson

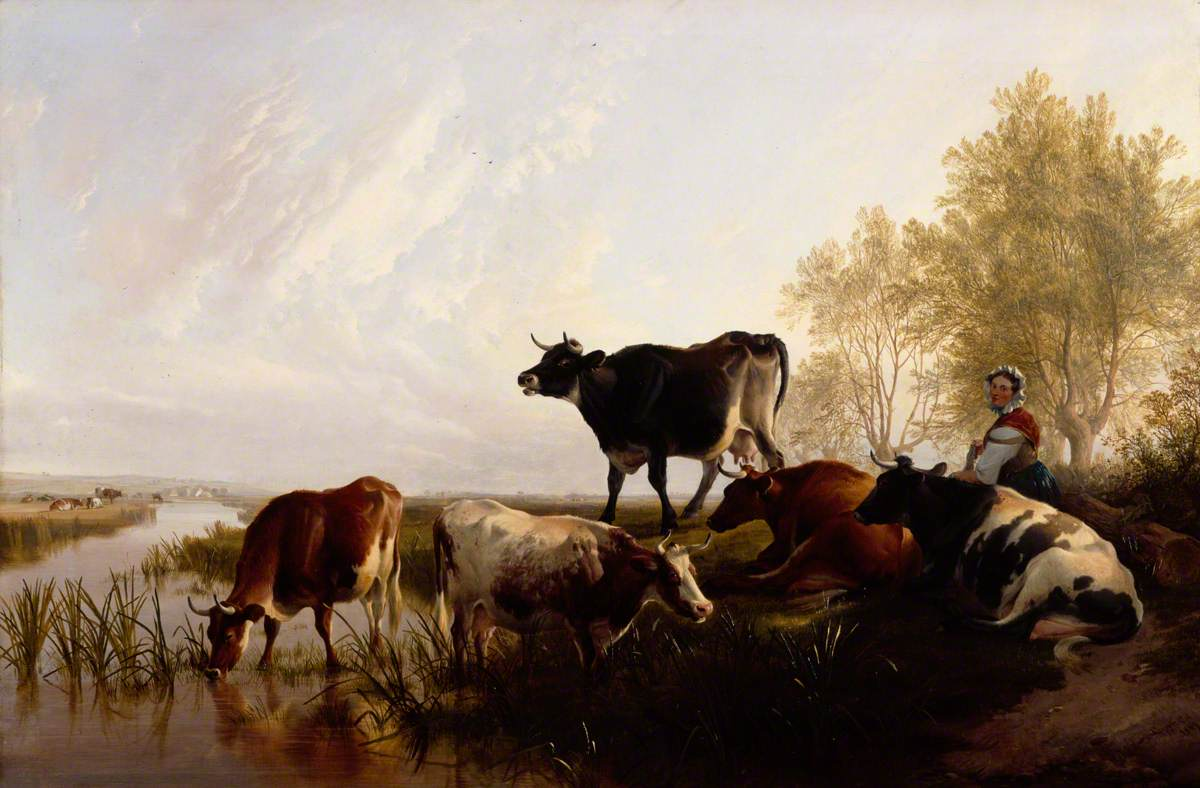
Milking Time in the Meadows by Thomas Sidney Cooper

French Sloop Entering the Harbour of Tréport by Edward William Cooke

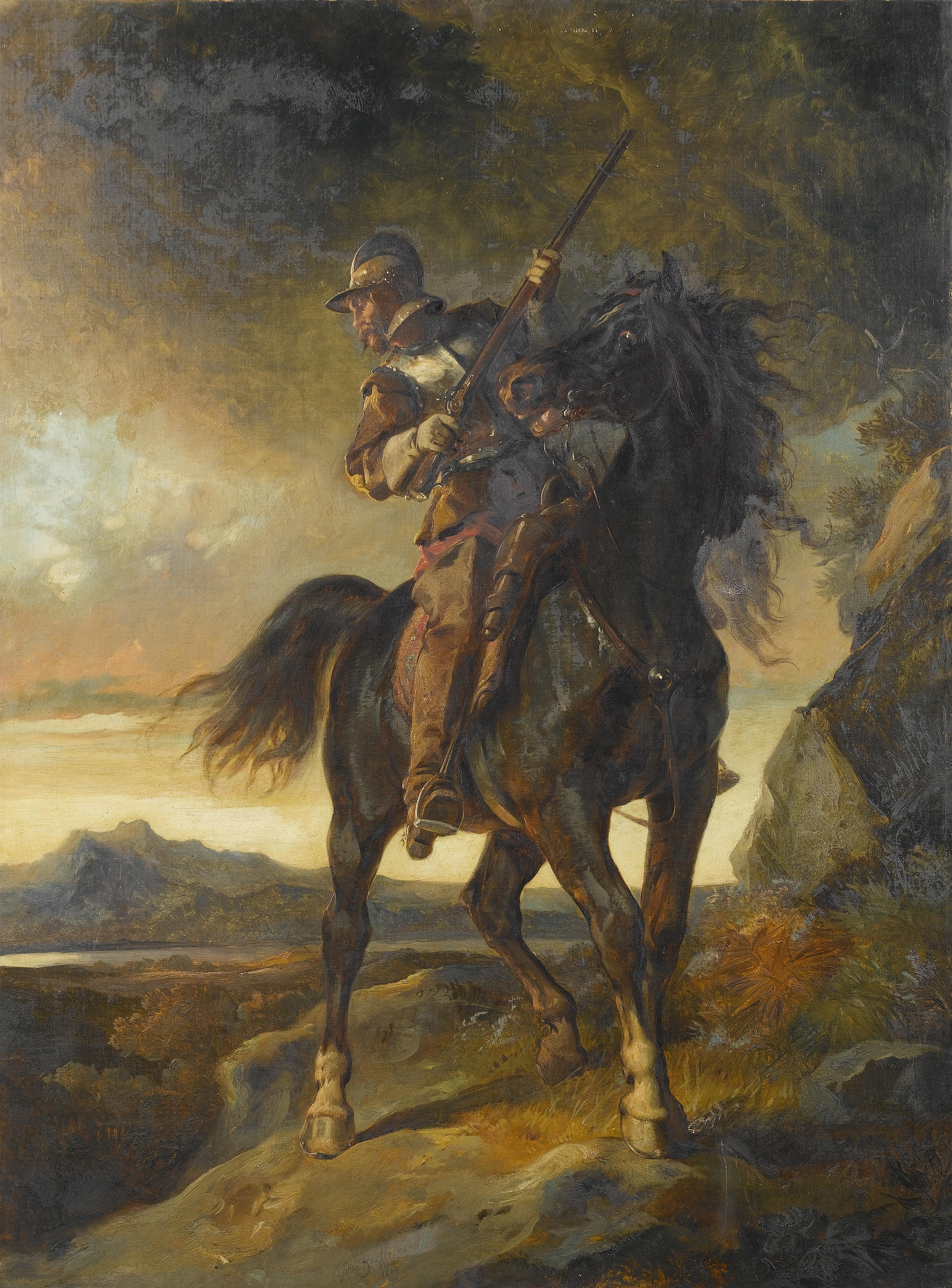
The Moss-Trooper by Thomas Jones Barker

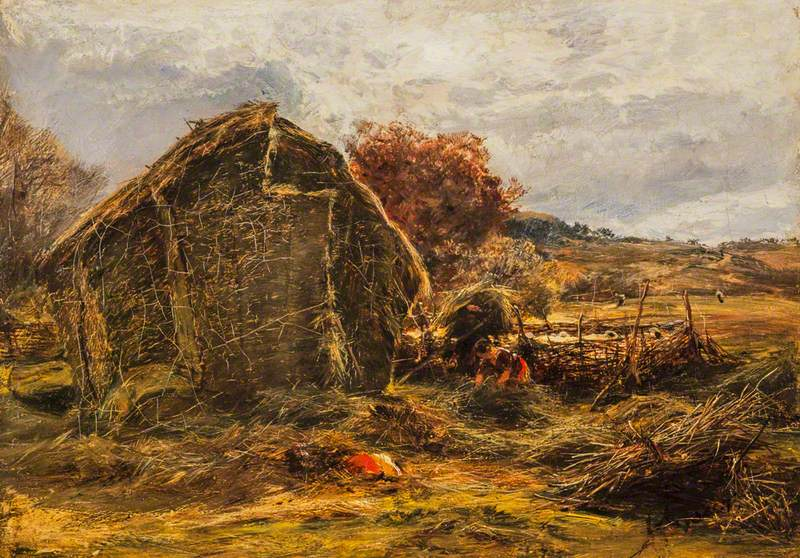
A Sheepfold by Alexander Fraser

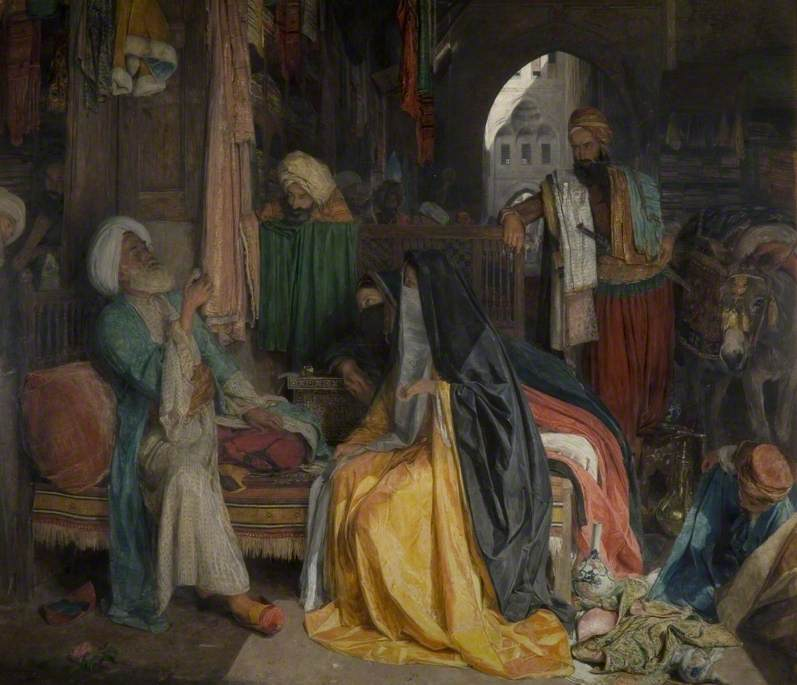
The Doubtful Coin by John Frederick Lewis

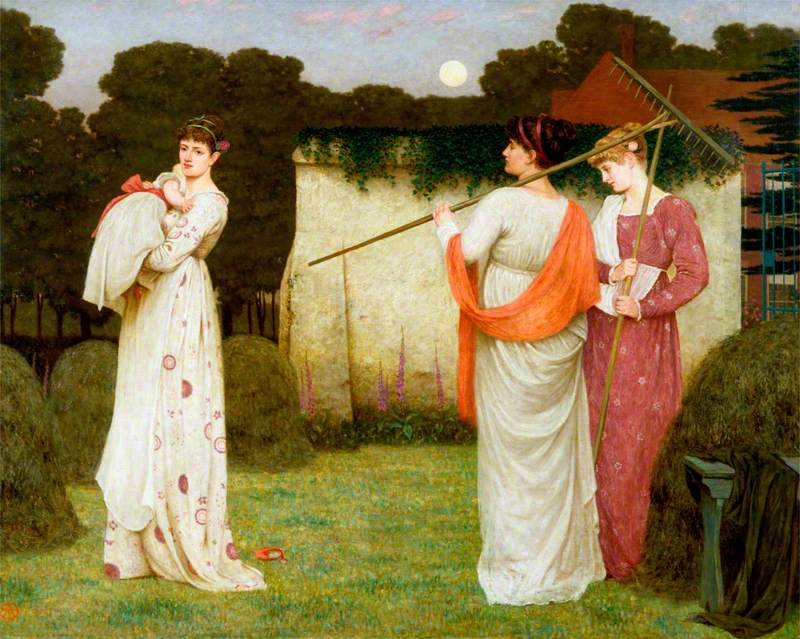
The Hay Field by Thomas Armstrong

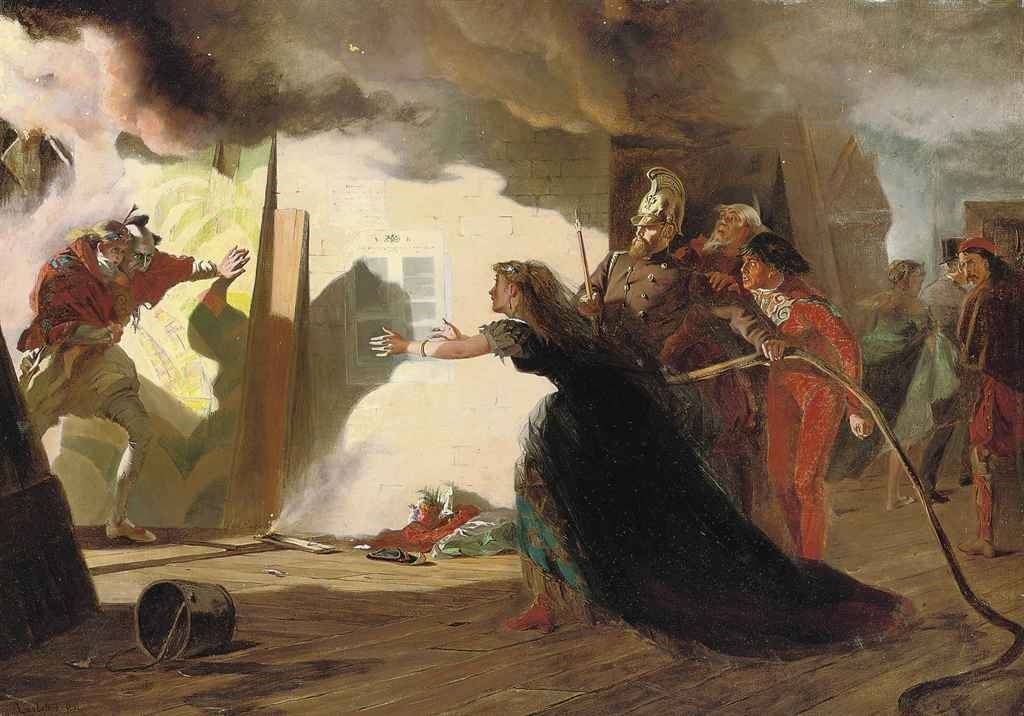
Fire at the Theatre by Laslett John Pott

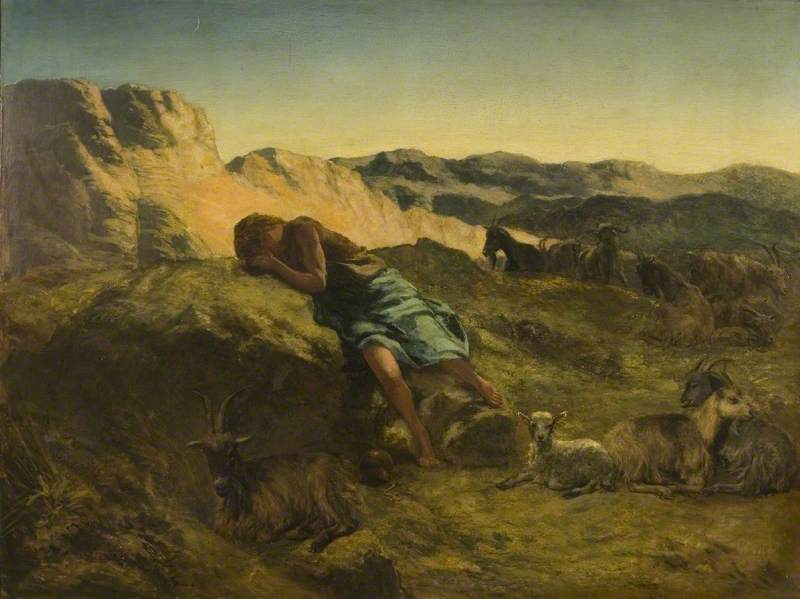
The Prodigal Son by Paul Falconer Poole

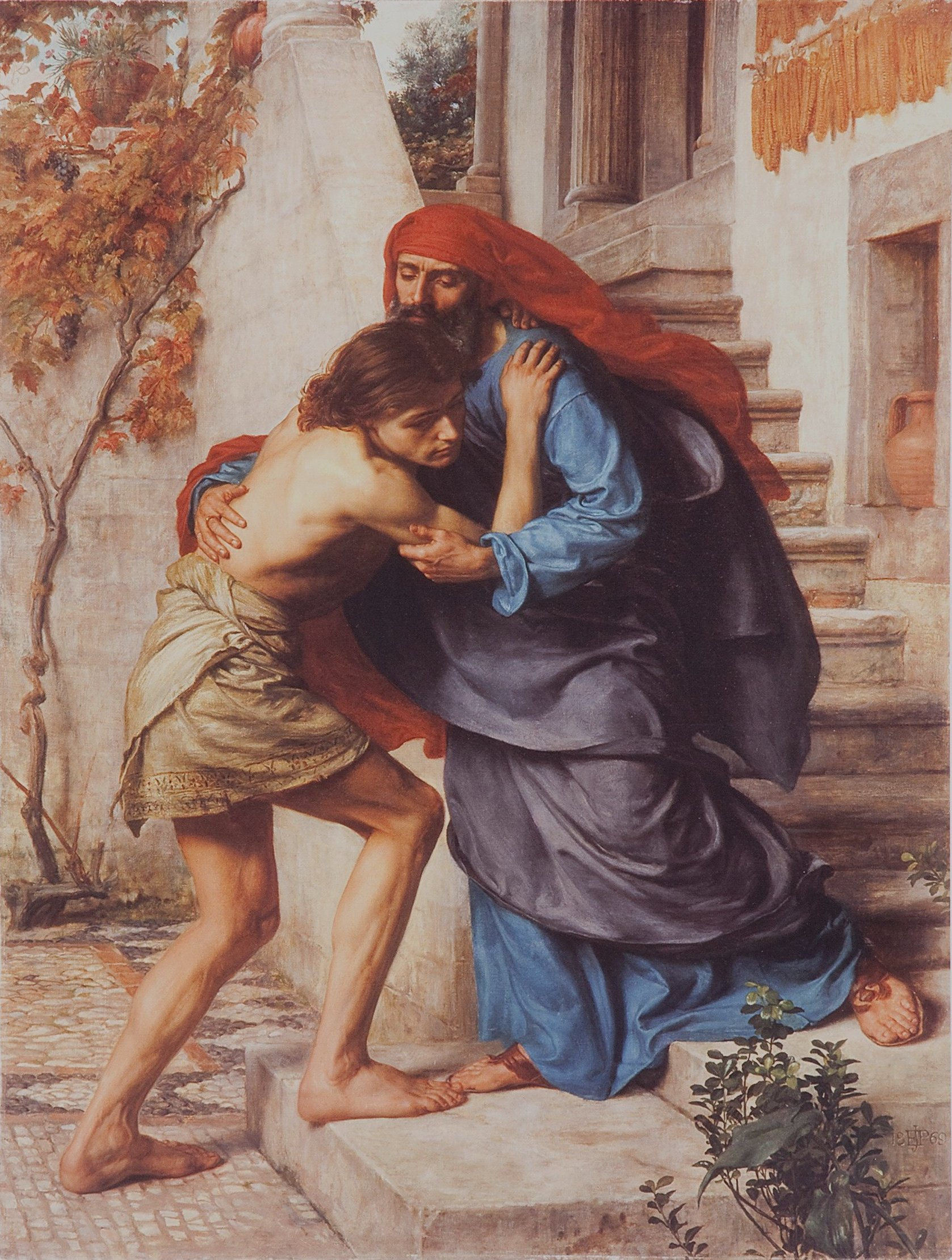
The Prodigal's Return by Edward Poynter

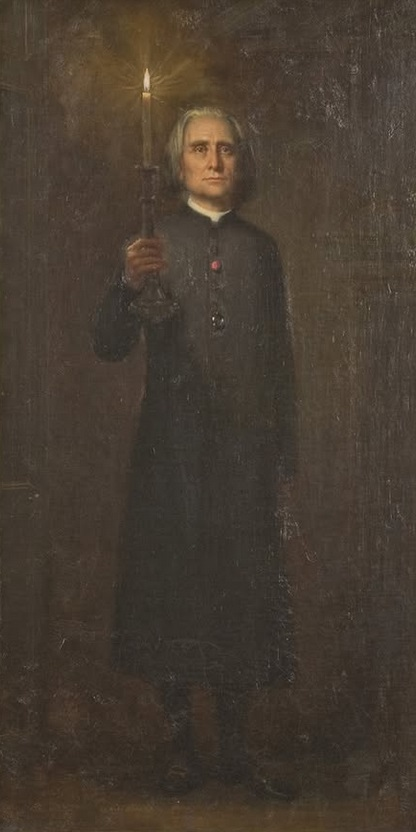
Liszt by George Peter Alexander Healy

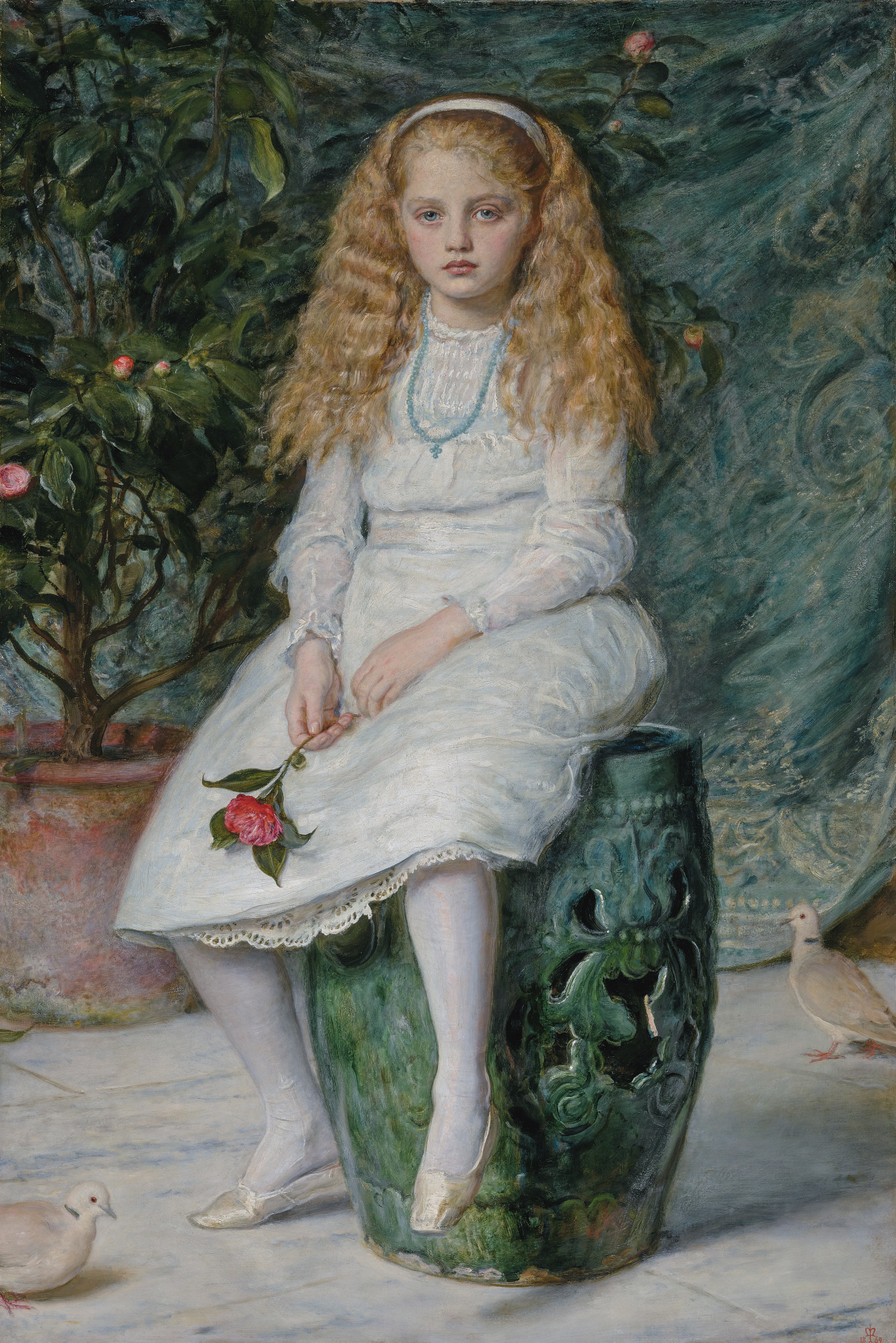
Portrait of Nina Lehmann by John Everett Millais

A Man in Armour by William Powell Frith

Earl of Harrington by Francis Grant

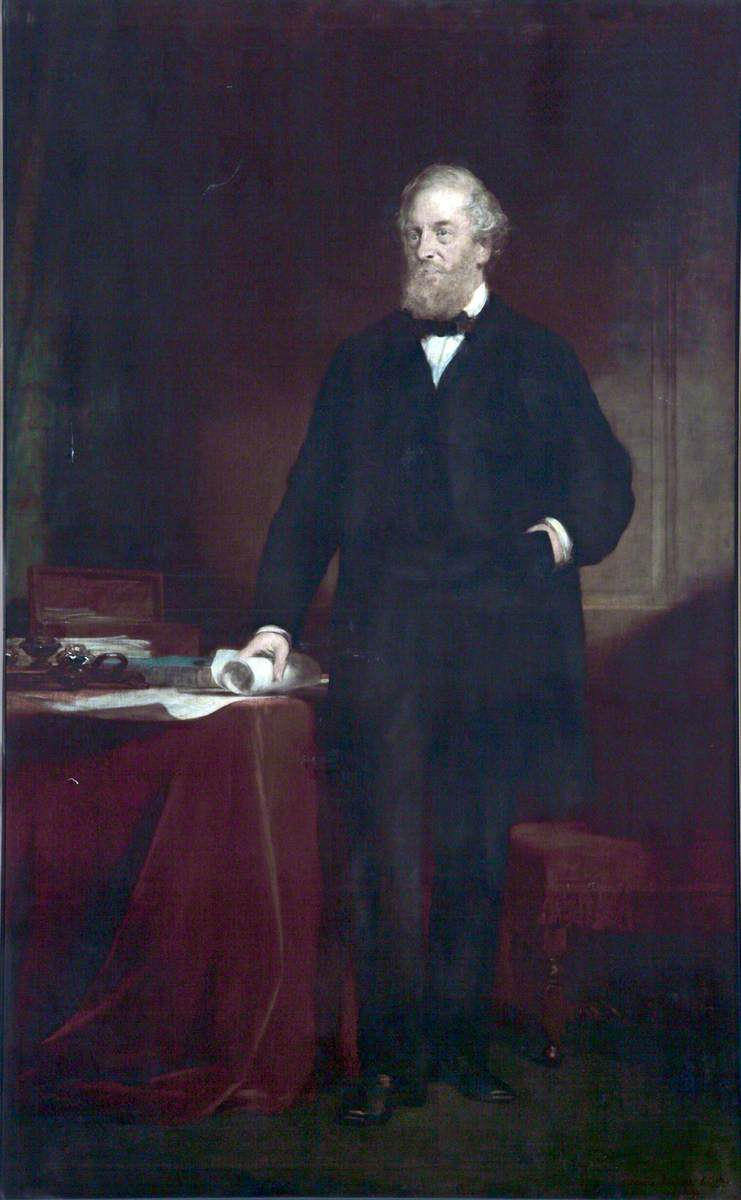
Sir William Jackson by Daniel Macnee

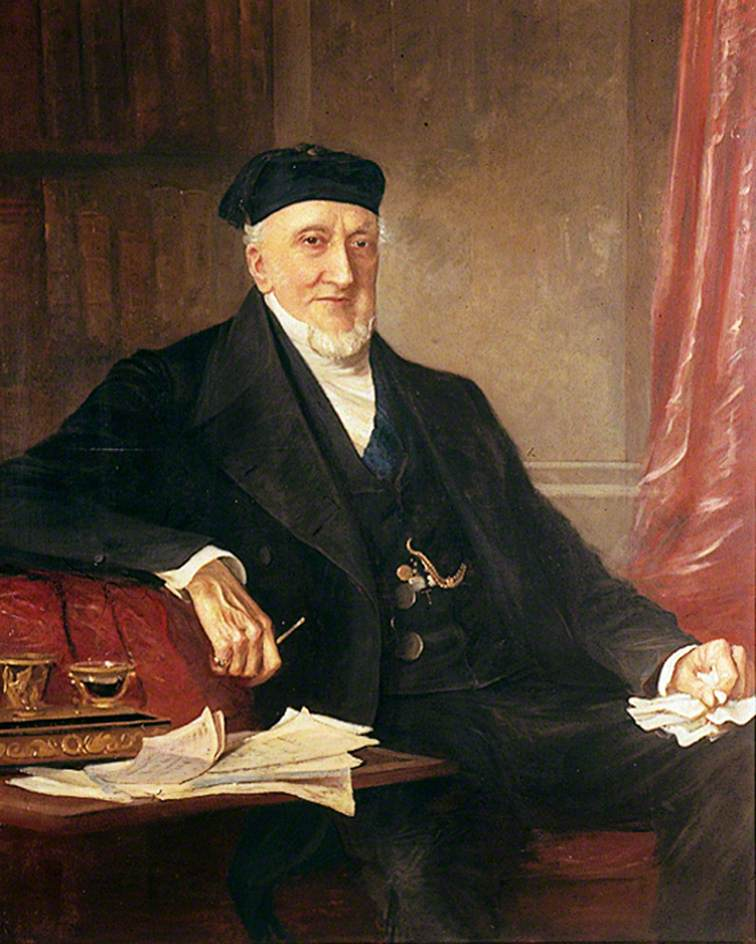
Moses Montefiore by Solomon Hart

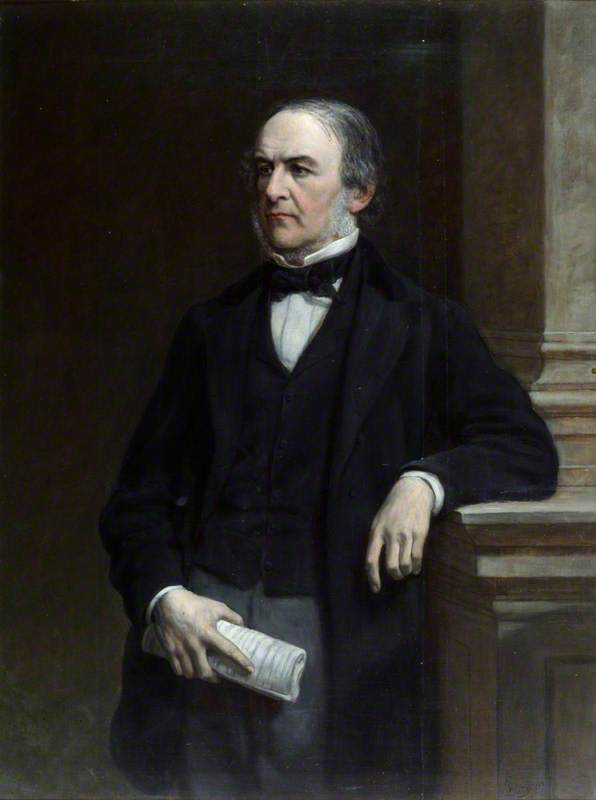
William Gladstone by Charles Lucy

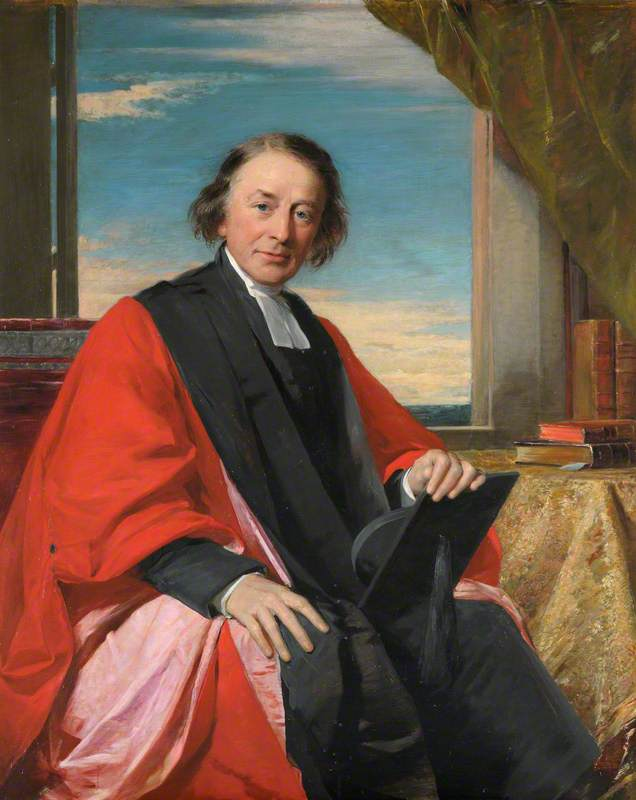
Thomas Worsley by George Richmond

== Bibliography ==
- Bledsoe, Robert Terrell. Dickens, Journalism, Music: 'Household Words' and 'All The Year Round'. A&C Black, 2012.
- Murray, Peter. Daniel Maclise, 1806–1870: Romancing the Past. Crawford Art Gallery, 2009.
- Ormond, Richard. Sir Edwin Landseer. Philadelphia Museum of Art, 1981.
