= Caught by the Tide =

Painting by James Clarke Hook

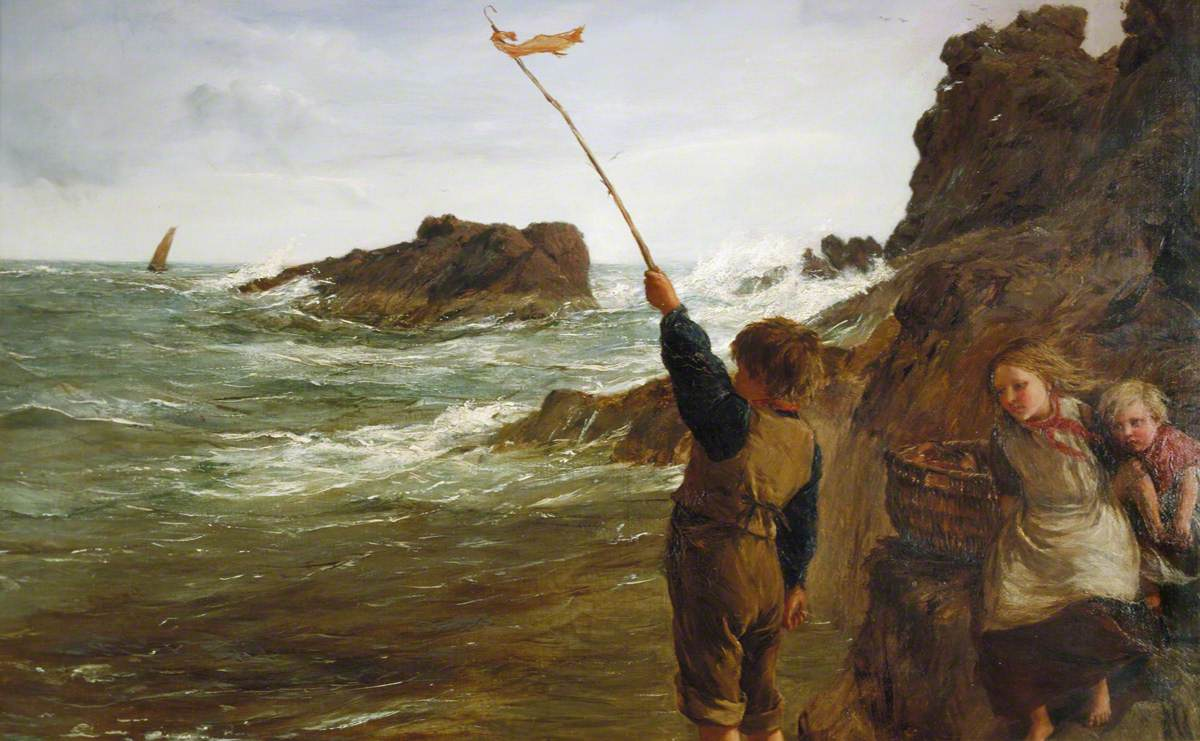
- Artist: James Clarke Hook
- Year: 1869
- Type: Oil on canvas, genre painting
- Dimensions: 68 cm × 108 cm (27 in × 43 in)
- Location: Guildhall Art Gallery, London

Caught by the Tide is an oil painting on canvas by the British artist James Clarke Hook, from 1869.

== History and description ==
It depicts a group of children who have become stranded by the rising tide while collecting crabs and are signalling to a passing ship. As often with Hook's paintings the sea is an active participant in the painting rather than being background, in this case as a threatening menace.

The painting was displayed at the Royal Academy Exhibition of 1869 held at Burlington House in London, one of three he exhibited that year. It was acquired by the art collector Charles Gassiot who in 1902 bequeathed it to the City of London's Guildhall Art Gallery.

== Bibliography ==
- McMaster, Juliet. James Clarke Hook: Painter of the Sea. McGill-Queen's University Press, 2023.
- Payne, Christiana. Where the Sea Meets the Land: Artists on the Coast in Nineteenth-century Britain. Sanson, 2007.
- Roe, Sonia & Hardy, Pat. Oil Paintings in Public Ownership in the City of London. Public Catalogue Foundation, 2009.
