= Venus Disrobing for the Bath =

Painting by Frederic Leighton

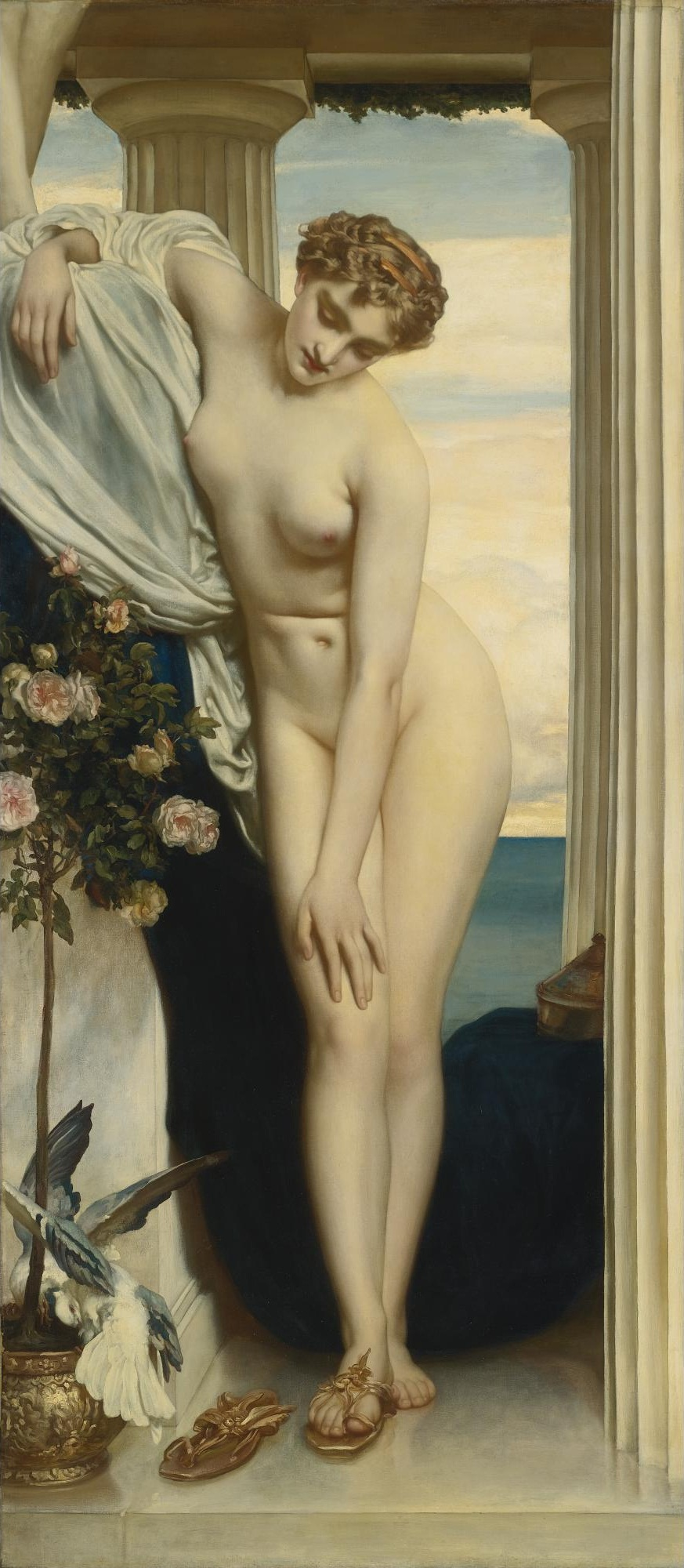
- Artist: Frederic Leighton
- Year: 1867
- Medium: Oil on canvas
- Dimensions: 200 cm × 90 cm (79 in × 35.5 in)

Venus Disrobing for the Bath is an oil painting by Frederic Leighton, first exhibited in 1867.

== History ==
Leighton's five contributions to the Royal Academy of 1867 were marked by an increasing devotion to Greek ideals, and by a refinement of finish. Among the pictures exhibited was Venus Disrobing for the Bath, one of the most debated of all the artist's paintings of the nude.

== Analysis ==
The paleness of the flesh-tint of this Venus aroused a criticism which has often been urged against his pictures that such a hue was not in nature. In imparting an ideal effect to an ideal subject, Leighton always, however, followed his own conviction that art has a law of its own, and a harmony of colour and form, derived and selected no doubt from natural loveliness, but not to be referred too closely to the natural, or to the average, in these things.

The art critic J. B. Atkinson praised the work, declaring that "Mr Leighton, instead of adopting corrupt Roman notions regarding Venus such as Rubens embodied, has wisely reverted to the Greek idea of Aphrodite, a goddess worshipped, and by artists painted, as the perfection of female grace and beauty." According to Edgcumbe Staley:

"Venus Disrobing for the Bath" is one of Leighton's most artistic ideal pictures. It is marked by all his calmness of invention and his beauty of execution. The paleness of the flesh tints is very striking; but then Venus was born from the sea-foam. There are a stillness and a depth in treatment which harmonize serenely with the blaze of a midday sun and call to mind the grand effects of Turner and Claude. The goddess, admirably drawn and modelled, is just disengaging her sandal; her pose is quite after Leonardo da Vinci's manner. The accessories are beautifully rendered—the marble columns, the standard rose-bush in full flower, the pair of white doves, and the deep blue sea and crimson-streaked sky beyond. This picture may be regarded as the union of two ideas—ideal Greek without antique conventions and the energies of modern impulse and passion. This is a presentation of Leighton's sense of eclectic beauty in its greatest perfection.

== See also ==
- Aphrodite Urania
- Venus Anadyomene

== Sources ==
- Ash, Russell (1995). Lord Leighton. London: Pavilion Books Limited. p. 13.
- Gaunt, William (1975). Victorian Olympus. London: Sphere Books Ltd. pp. 78, 79, 175.
- Jones, Stephen, et al. (1996). Frederic Leighton, 1830–1896. Royal Academy of Arts, London: Harry N. Abrams, Inc. pp. 27–28, 39, 109, 119, 145, 170, 214.
- Rhys, Ernest (1900). Frederic Lord Leighton: An Illustrated Record of his Life and Work. London: George Bell & Sons. pp. 24–25, 110, 124, 143.
- Smith, Alison (1996). The Victorian Nude: Sexuality, Morality, and Art. Manchester: Manchester University Press. p. 145–46.
- Staley, Edgcumbe (1906). Lord Leighton of Stretton. London: The Walter Scott Publishing Co., Ltd.; New York: Charles Scribner's Sons. p. 73.
- "A Pastoral by Frederic Lord Leighton". The Victorian Web. 2 December 2004. Accessed 2 July 2022.
