= Morning in the Meadows =

Painting by Frederick Richard Lee

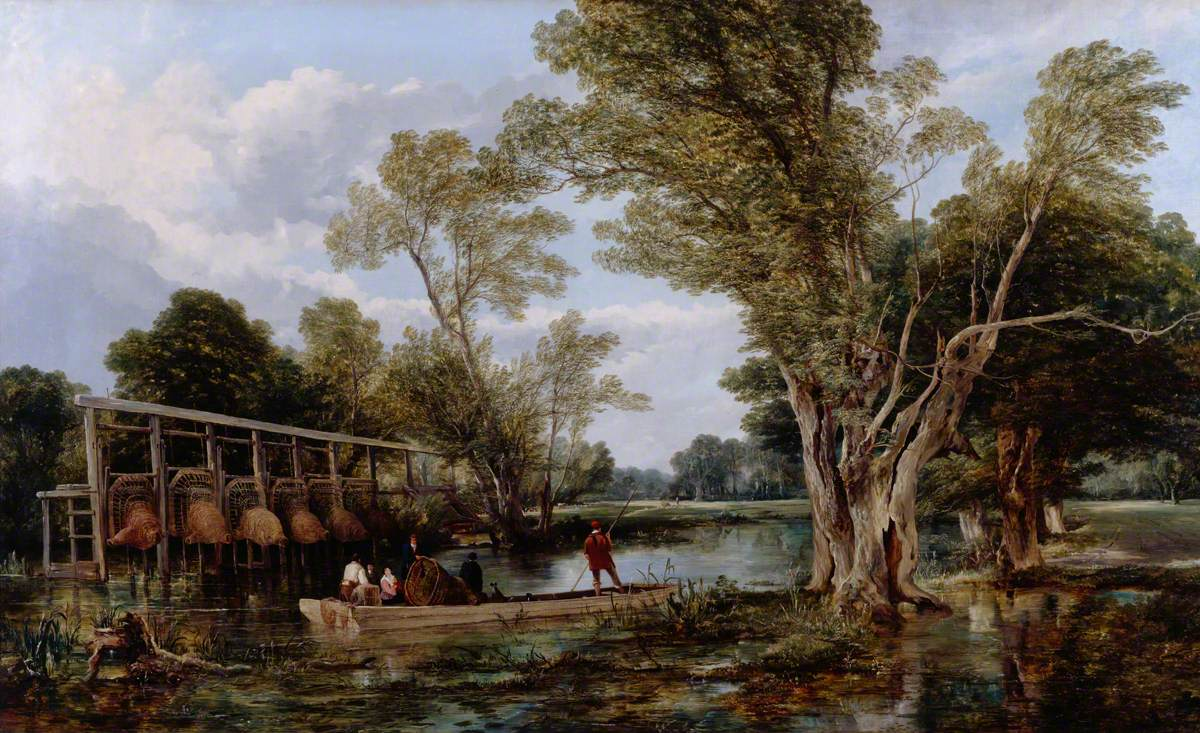
- Artist: Frederick Richard Lee
- Year: 1869
- Type: Oil on canvas, landscape painting
- Dimensions: 112 cm × 183 cm (44 in × 72 in)
- Location: Royal Academy, London

Morning in the Meadows is an 1869 landscape painting by the British artist Frederick Richard Lee. It shows a crossing of the River Thames at Cliveden. It features the ferry used to take livestock and passengers from either bank. Shown prominently as well are the large baskets strung across the river to catch eels. The Devon-born Lee was known for his landscapes of rural England, continuing in the tradition of John Constable.

The painting was displayed at the Royal Academy Exhibition of 1869 held at Burlington House in London. When Lee was elected as a Royal Acamedican in 1838 he was required to submit a diploma work , but for some reason the presentation was delayed. In 1869 he chose this painting to present. It remains in the collection of the Royal Academy of Arts today.

== Bibliography ==
- Hancher, Michael. The Tenniel illustrations to the Alice books. Ohio State University Press, 1985.
- Maas, Jeremy. Victorian Painters . Barrie & Jenkins, 1978.
