= King Cophetua and the Beggar Maid (Maclise) =

Painting by Daniel Maclise

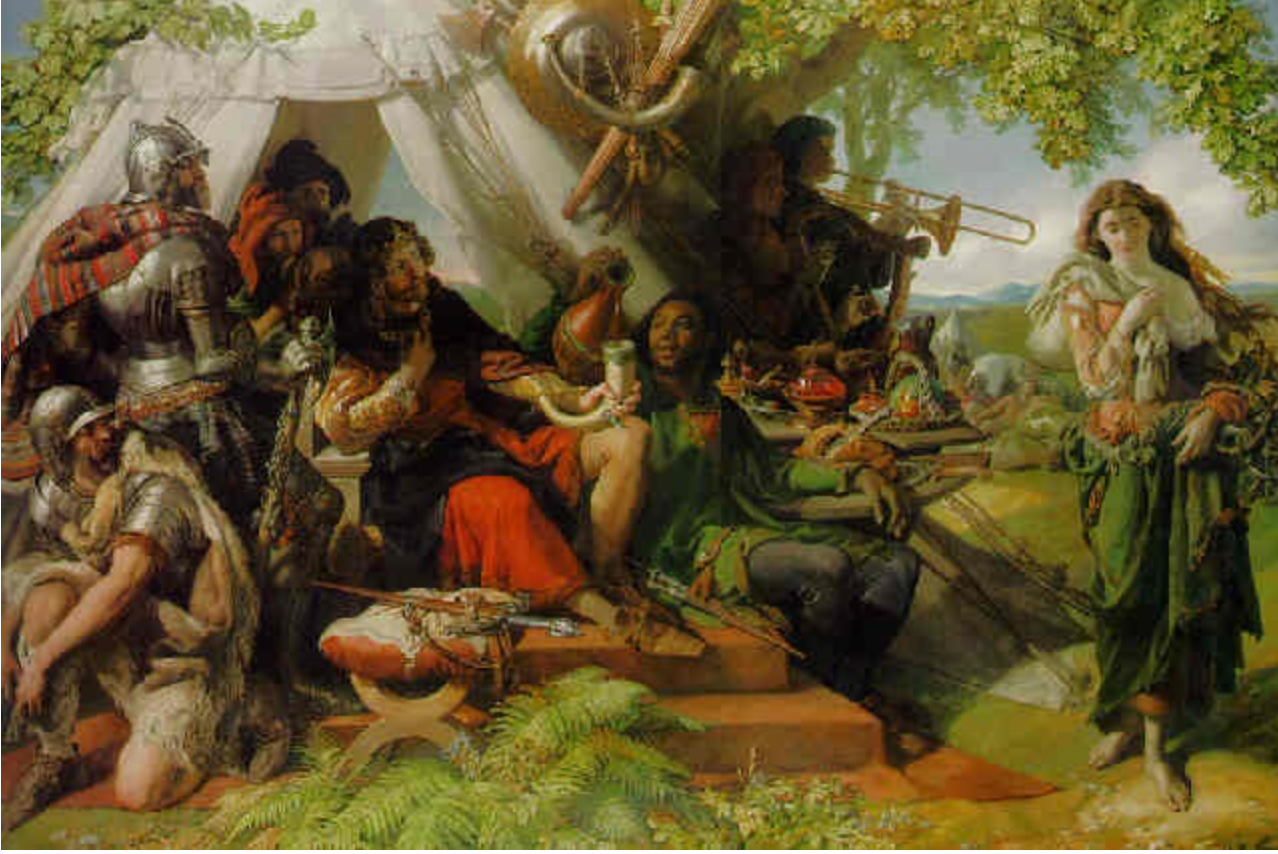
- Artist: Daniel Maclise
- Year: 1869
- Type: Oil on canvas, history painting
- Dimensions: 120 cm × 181.5 cm (47 in × 71.5 in)
- Location: Private collection

King Cophetua and the Beggar Maid is an 1869 history painting by the Irish artist Daniel Maclise. It depicts a scene inspired by folk song The King and the Beggar-maid about the monarch Cophetua and his love for a beautiful beggar girl who he decides to make his queen. The story is referenced in Shakespeare's Romeo and Juliet but Maclise drew heavily on the 1833 poem by Alfred Tennyson.

Maclise was noted for his historical scenes and had been commissioned to produce frescoes for the new Houses of Parliament at Westminster. The painting was displayed at the Royal Academy Exhibition of 1869 held at the Burlington House in London. It was the penultimate exhibited work for Maclise who died the following year. The same subject was painted by Edward Burne-Jones in his 1884 work King Cophetua and the Beggar Maid.

== Bibliography ==
- Murray, Peter. Daniel Maclise, 1806-1870: Romancing the Past. University of Michigan, 2008.
- Weston, Nancy. Daniel Maclise: Irish Artist in Victorian London. Four Courts Press, 2001.
