= The Elder Sister =

1869 painting by William Adolphe Bouguereau

- La soeur aînée (French)
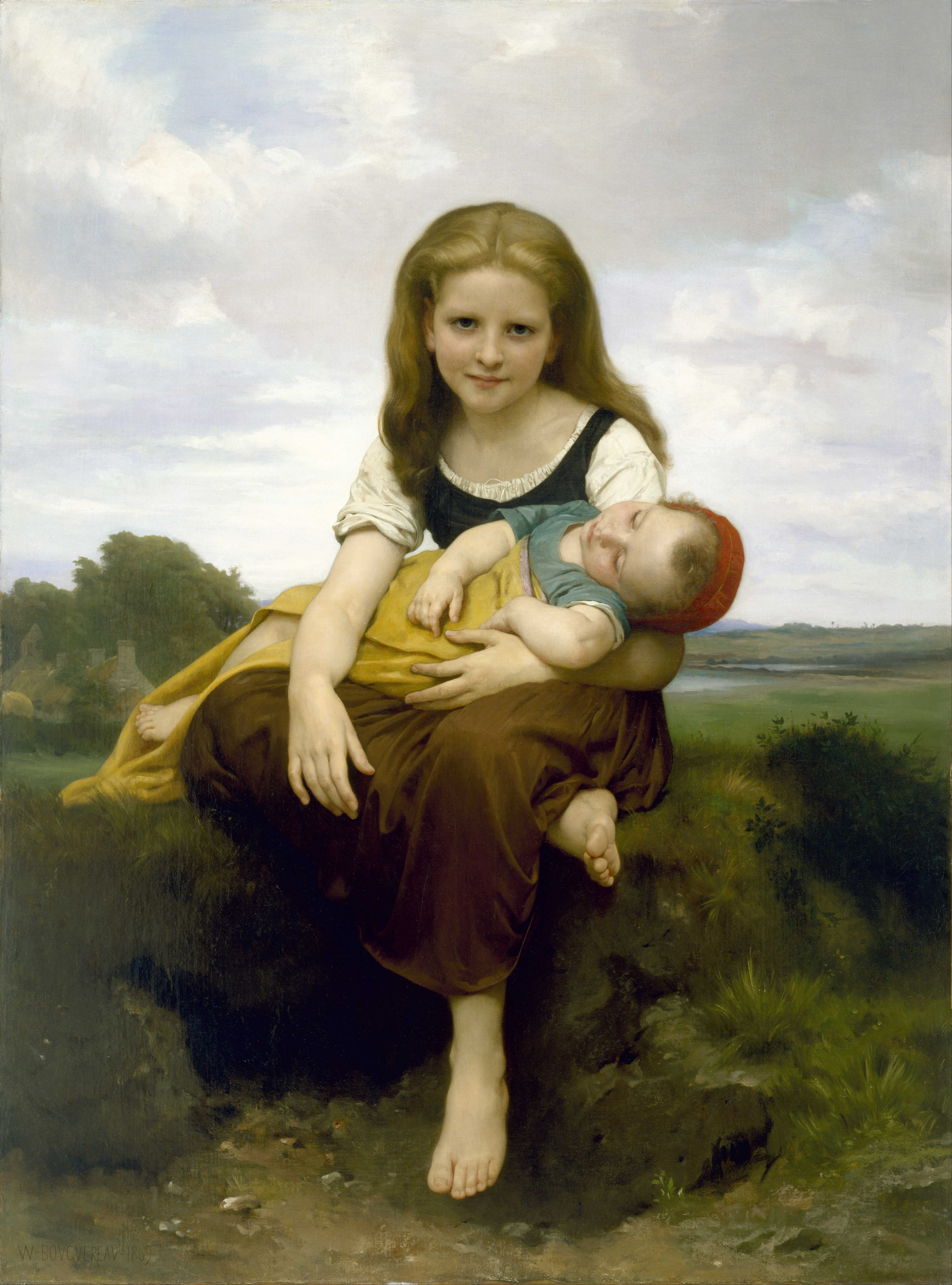
- The Elder Sister (1869)
- Artist: William-Adolphe Bouguereau
- Year: 1869
- Medium: Oil on canvas
- Movement: Academic art
- Dimensions: 130.2 cm × 97.2 cm (51.3 in × 38.3 in)
- Location: Museum of Fine Arts, Houston

The Elder Sister (French: La soeur aînée) is an oil-on-canvas painting created in 1869 by the French academic artist William-Adolphe Bouguereau. It was acquired in 1992 by the Museum of Fine Arts, Houston, as a gift. According to the museum website, the painting was the gift of an anonymous lady in memory of her father. Since then, The Elder Sister has been a part of the permanent collection of the museum and is placed in its "Arts of Europe" section. It has become one of the most notable highlights among the museum's collection of paintings.

The painting shows a girl ("the elder sister") sitting on a rock and holding a sleeping baby on her lap. A quiet rural landscape serves as the background. For this scene, Bouguereau's daughter, Henriette, and son, Paul, served as models. Bouguereau used great care and attention in drawing the children's features and the positioning of their bodies, giving them an idyllic look. The girl's eyes look directly at the viewer and both children are shown with immaculate clothing.

The dimensions of the painting are 51¼ × 38¼ in (130.2 × 97.2 cm) and the frame is 67½ × 55 × 5½ in (171.5 × 139.7 × 14 cm).

Another painting by Bouguereau also is entitled The Elder Sister (completed in 1864). It currently belongs to the permanent collection of the Brooklyn Museum.
