= The Calm Sea =

Painting by Gustave Courbet

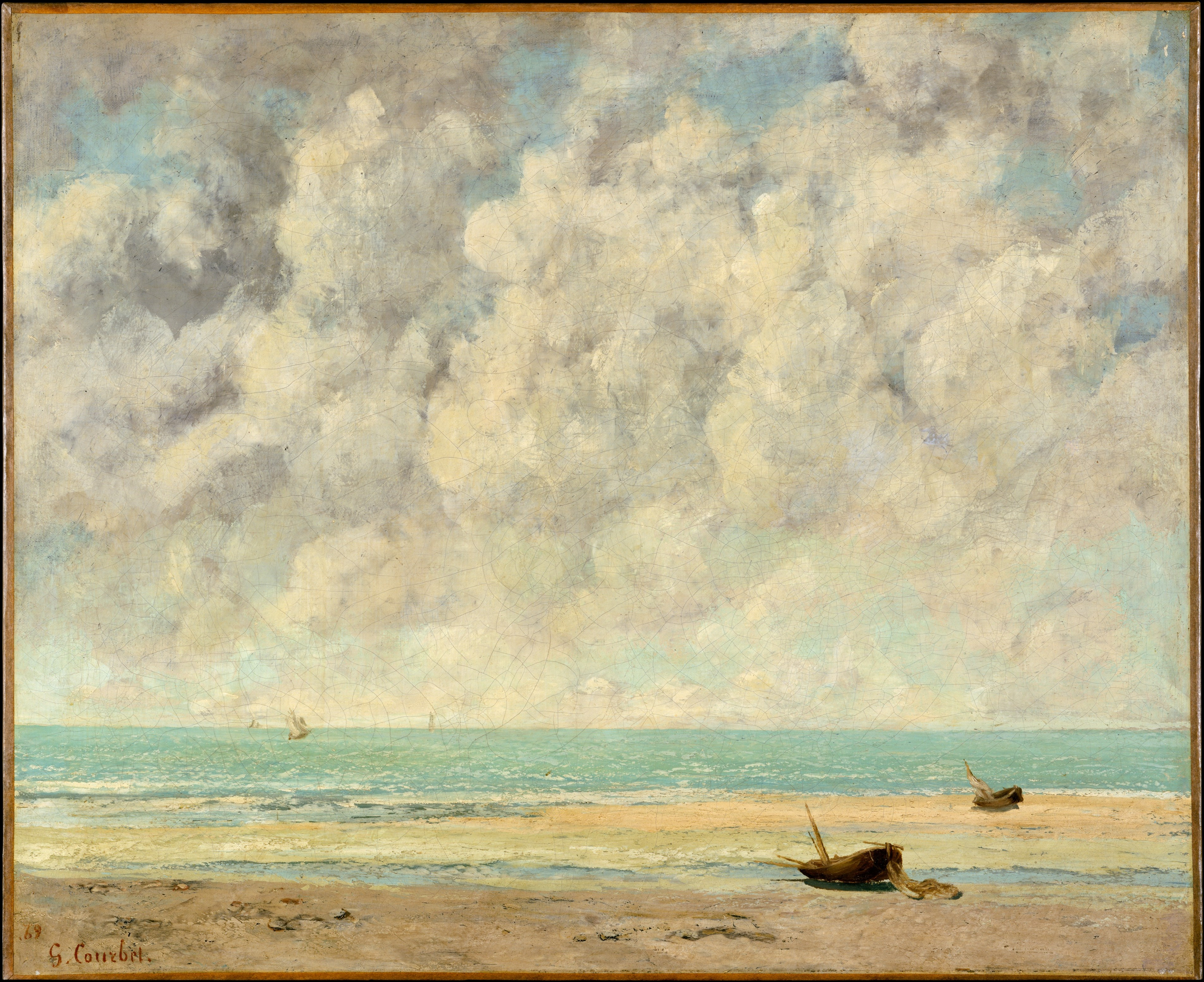
- Artist: Gustave Courbet
- Year: 1869
- Medium: Oil on canvas
- Dimensions: 59.7 cm × 73 cm (23.5 in × 29 in)
- Location: Metropolitan Museum of Art; New York

The Calm Sea is an 1869 painting by Gustave Courbet. Done in oil on canvas, the seascape depicts a beach on the Normandy coast stretched out before the English Channel. The painting is in the collection of the Metropolitan Museum of Art, in New York.
