= Frederick Richard Lee =

English artist (1798-1879)

Frederick Richard Lee RA
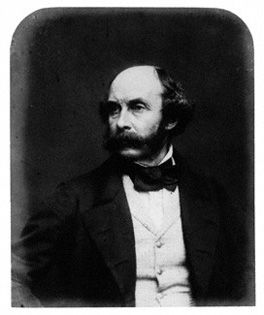
- late 1850s portrait
- Born: 10 June 1798; Barnstaple
- Died: 5 June 1879 (aged 80); South Africa
- Known for: painter

Frederick Richard Lee RA (10 June 1798 in Barnstaple, Devon – 5 June 1879 in Vleesch Bank, South Africa) was an English artist.

== Life ==
Shattered Oak in Bedfordshire By F.R.Lee (1851)

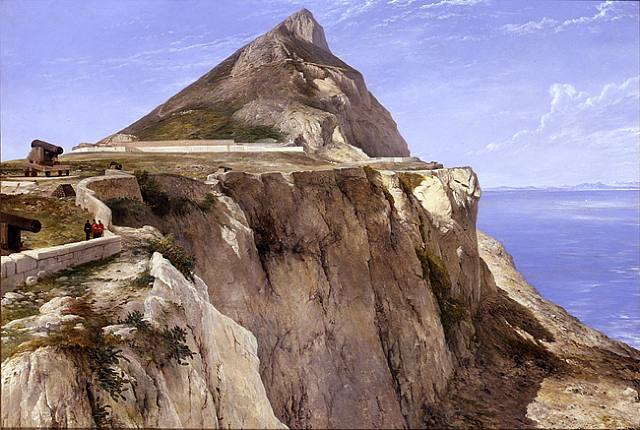
1862 painting of the Rock of Gibraltar with Windmill Hill Barracks in view

Lee was the son of Thomas Lee of Barnstaple in north Devon and brother of Thomas Lee (Jnr), an architect.

Frederick enrolled as a student at the Royal Academy on 16 January 1818, aged nineteen. Although no dated paintings are recorded from this time, by the time of his election as an Associate of the Royal Academy (A.R.A.) on 3 November 1834, at least six dated paintings existed. One of F.R. Lee's paintings from this time is Bringing in the Stag, an oil, measuring 38 cm x 51 cm (1830) at the Tate Gallery in London).

Lee was elected to full membership of the Royal Academy on 10 February 1838. A further seven paintings have been documented as painted by Lee before this date, again as oils, mainly on canvas. The Tate Gallery has an example from this period of his career in Sea Coast Sunrise, which is also painted in oil and is 85 cm x 109 cm (1834). He is known to have produced a further forty dated paintings over the next thirty years. In addition to the dated paintings, fifty undated paintings exist, including Lake in a Park.

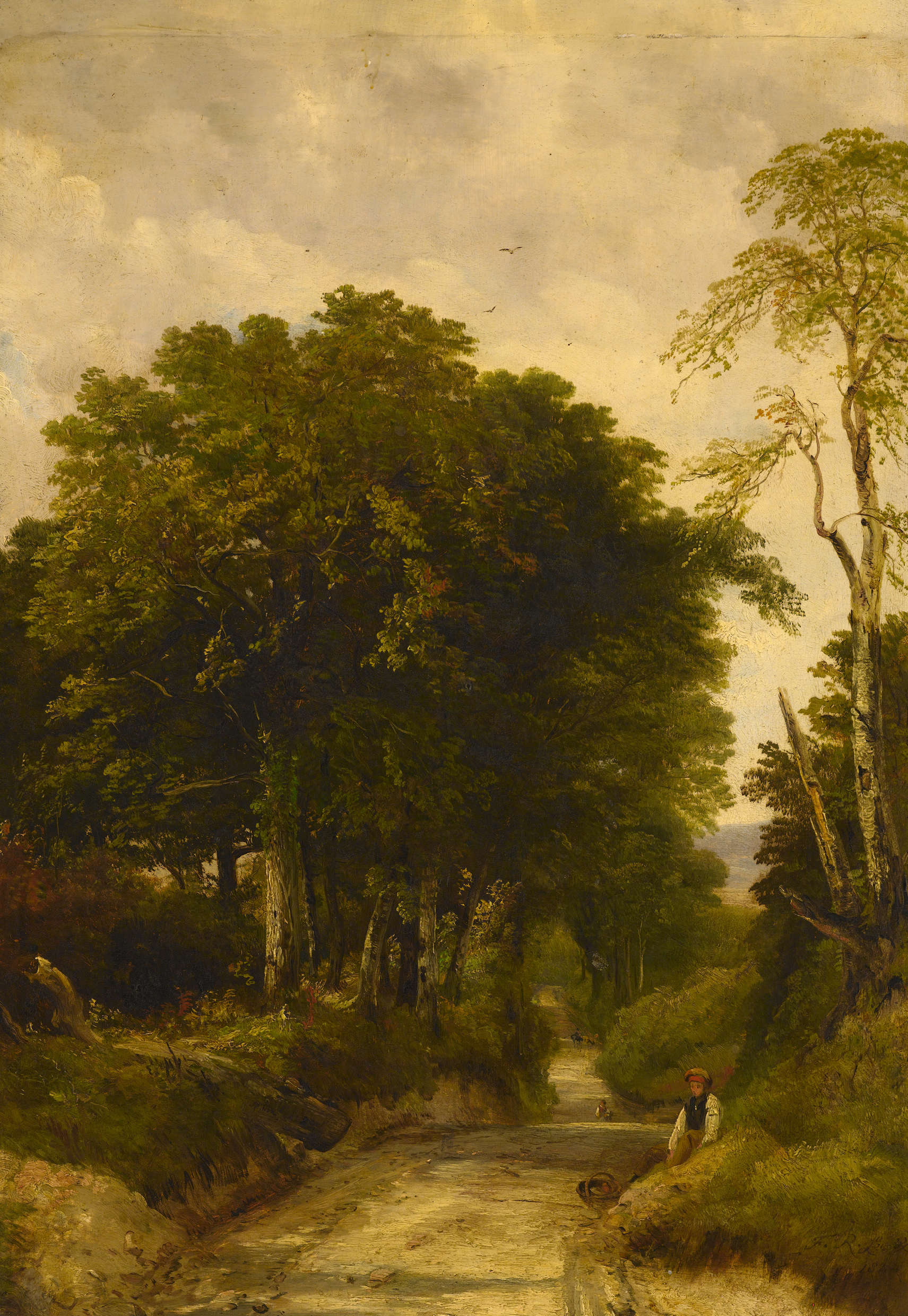
A Devon Lane by Frederick Richard Lee (1844)

Lee had a house at Pilton, near Barnstaple, but being from early life devoted to the sea, he lived a great deal on board his yacht, in which he visited the coasts of France, Spain, and Italy. He exhibited for the last time in 1870, and became an honorary retired academician in the following year. Lee died at Vleesch Bank, Herman station, in the division of Malmsay, South Africa, where some of his family were living, on 5 June 1879.

== Career ==
Lee was a prolific artist, based on the number of oil paintings he is known to have produced, both on canvas and on board. His subject matter choices clearly shared influences with John Constable and other contemporaries. Some of his more notable paintings were done in collaboration with Thomas Sidney Cooper (between 1848 and 1856) and Sir Edwin Landseer, Lee painting the landscape and Cooper and Landseer adding the animals. Landscapes and pastoral scenes form the majority of his painting interest, with some exceptions, for example, Cover Side, The Campfire and Gypsy Tent.

Scottish scenes figured prominently as subjects for Lee, but he also traveled extensively elsewhere in Britain and the continent: Gillingham Mill, Dorset; North Duffield Bridge, Derbyshire; Swiss Bridge, Lynedoch; Fulford Park, Exeter; Ben More looking up Glen Dochart; Shattered Oak in Bedfordshire; Sleaford, Lincolnshire; Rock of Gibraltar; and Pont du Gard, are all examples of this. Lee also spent considerable time at Penshurst, Kent where a number of his paintings originate. His wife Harriet Eves Lee was buried in the churchyard there (at plot 147) after her death in 1850.

Lee's life has been documented elsewhere, and the popularity of his painting remains his lasting legacy. Many of his works have brought substantial prices when sold in recent times. He had a long career with over 90 identified paintings to his credit. However, some recent information has come to light detailing more than 300 of his paintings, suggesting many still reside in private hands or in the unpublished care of museums/National Trust properties. The Constable influence remained throughout his career and he was apparently not tempted to follow the Turner impressionist style, but remained true to his original interests despite the Industrial Revolution taking place around him.

Lee's paintings were much in demand during his lifetime, and he was certainly not a poor, struggling artist — he appears to have been fairly well-off at the end of his career. Perhaps another aspect to his painting style and prolific output could have been financial. He knew his market, and painted subjects in the style he knew would be popular.

In the last 15 years of his life, Lee divided his time between Broadgate House, his yacht, and South Africa, where he owned several farms. Lee retired on 1 December 1871 and died and was buried near Wellington in South Africa on 5 June 1879. Only three photographic portraits of Frederick Richard Lee have survived, and they can be found in the National Portrait Gallery (London).

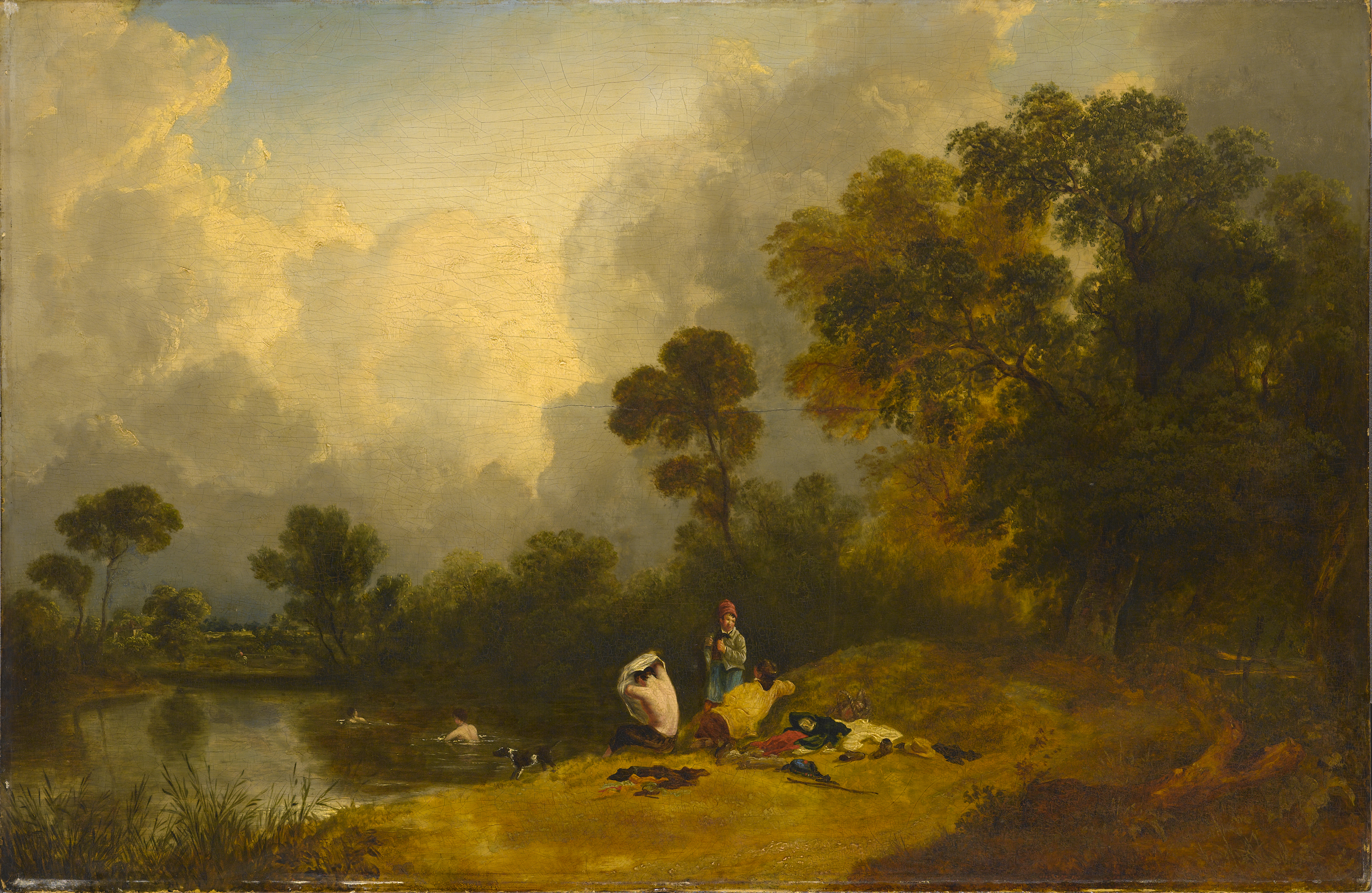
Boys Bathing in a River By Frederick Richard Lee RA (1823-1870)

== Paintings in public collections ==
Paintings by Lee in public collections are (in chronological order):

Displayed at	Name	Size	Date
Tate Gallery	Cover Side	48 cm x 40 cm	1839
Penrhyn Castle	The River Ogwen at Cochwillan Mill		1849
Tate Gallery	Evening in the Meadows	93 cm x 122 cm	1854
Tate Gallery	A River Scene	127 cm x 183 cm	1855
Norwich Castle	Mill on Ogwen River	25 cm x 35 cm	1857
de Young Museum, San Francisco	The Overhanging Trees	84.5 cm x 109.9 cm	1865
Met Museum	Garibaldi's Residence in Caprera	87 cm x 138.1 cm	1865
Museum of Barnstaple and North Devon	The River Taw, and the North Devon Railway		1868
Royal Academy	Morning in the Meadows	112 cm x183cm	1869
Royal Albert Memorial Museum & Art Gallery	Boys Bathing in a River		about 1823-1870

Lee has at least fifty paintings in public collections in the UK.

== Gallery ==
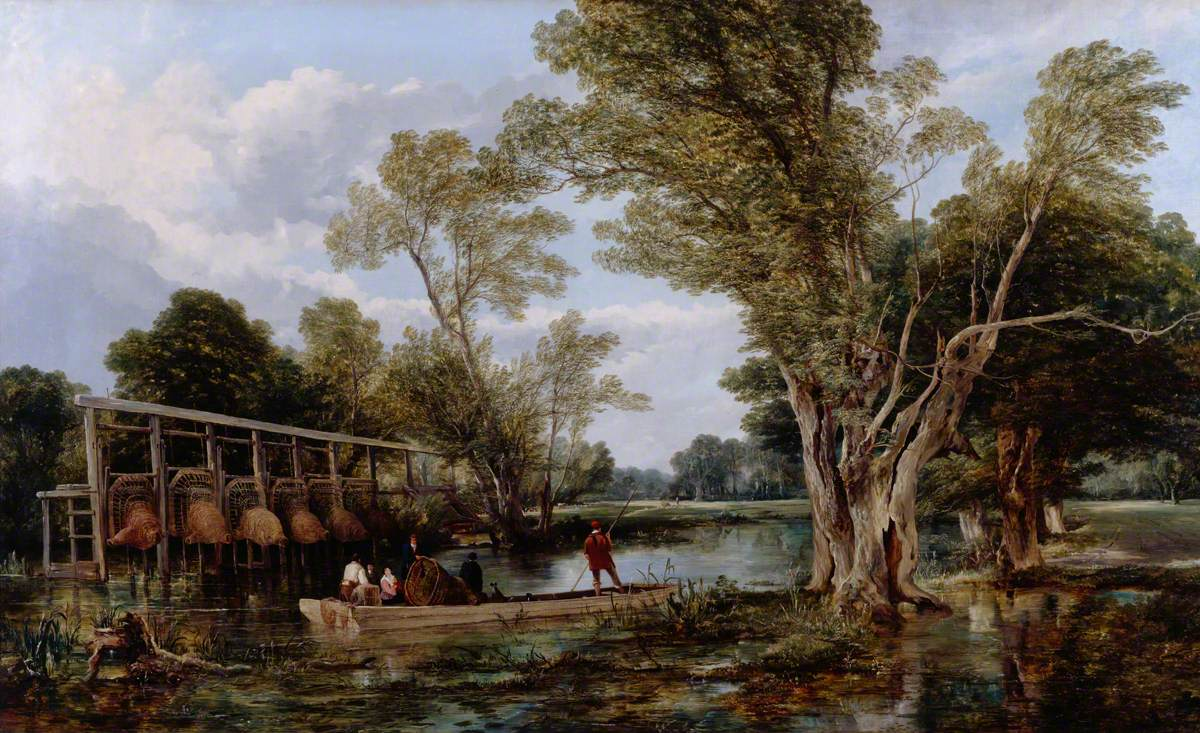
Morning in the Meadows, 1869

== Notes ==
Attribution

This article incorporates text from a publication now in the public domain: Cust, Lionel Henry (1892). "Lee, Frederick Richard". In Lee, Sidney (ed.). Dictionary of National Biography. Vol. 32. London: Smith, Elder & Co.
