= Stirling Smith Art Gallery and Museum =

Coordinates: 56°7′9″N 3°56′42″W

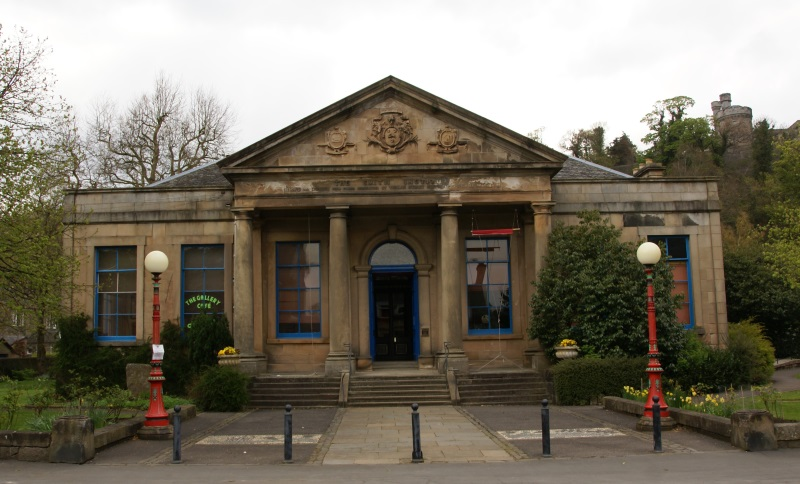

- Location within Stirling
- Former name: Smith Institute
- Established: 1874
- Location: Stirling, Scotland
- Type: Art and local history museum
- Website: www.smithmuseum.scot

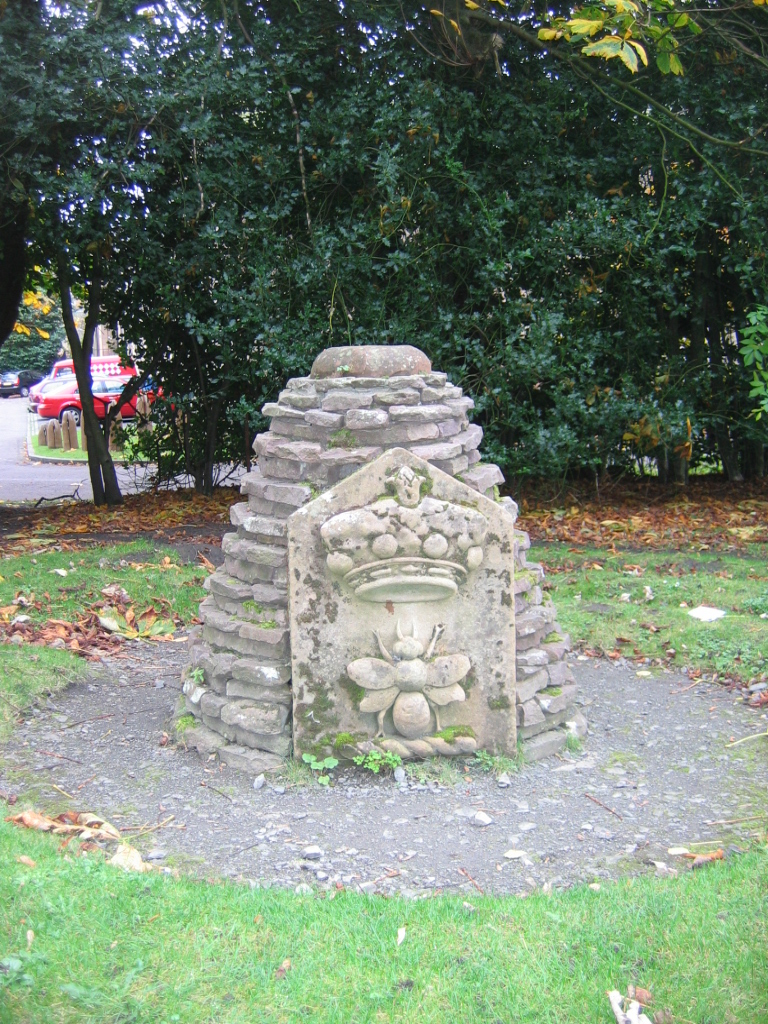
Cairn located within the Garden at The Smith Museum and Art Gallery.

Stirling Smith Art Gallery and Museum, formerly the Smith Institute, is an art and local history museum in Stirling, Scotland. The museum was founded in 1874 at the bequest of artist Thomas Stuart Smith.

== History ==
=== Founding ===
Thomas Stuart Smith's uncle, Alexander Smith, supplied funding so that Smith could travel and paint in Italy starting in 1840. By the end of that decade, Smith's work was accepted by both the Salon des Beaux Arts in Paris and the Royal Academy in London. In 1849, Alexander Smith died and eventually Smith's new inheritance enabled him to create an art collection at a studio in Fitzroy Square that included his own work. Smith decided to create an institute in Stirling to house his new collection. He drew up plans for a library, museum, and reading room. He signed the trust into existence in November 1869 along with trustees James Barty, the Provost of Stirling, and A. W. Cox, a fellow artist. Smith was prevented however from seeing his plans fulfilled as he died the next month in Avignon.

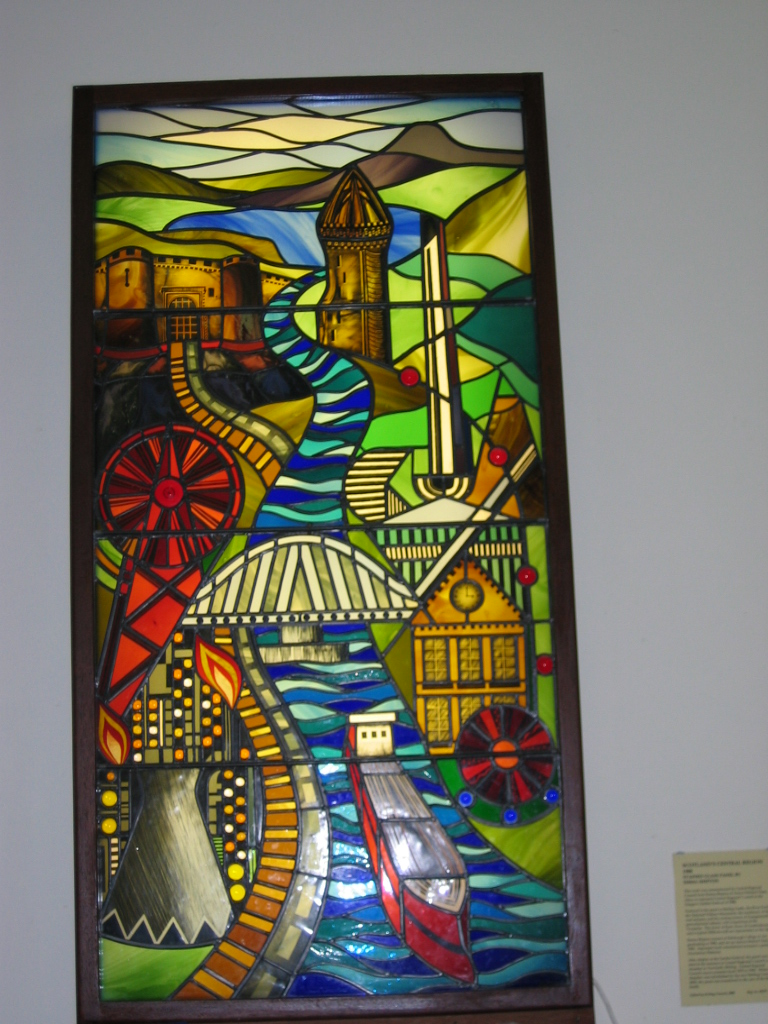
Stained Glass Window in Stirling Art Gallery

When the Smith site was selected, it was not in an advantageous part of the burgh. 1,400 people signed a petition pointing this out. The building was the second to be built on the north side of the Dumbarton Road, in the King's Park, which was under development as an up-market residential area. The King's Park was cut off from the old town by the medieval wall. It remained unconnected until a new vehicular road was driven through at the Corn Exchange when a Carnegie Library was built in 1904. There was no direct road to the Smith. The pathway from the High School of Stirling (now the Stirling Highland Hotel) was created as a main access route to the Smith only after the Institute was opened to the public. The issue of breaching the medieval wall was one which was traditionally opposed by the people of Stirling. The autocratic way in which the site was selected and the extinction of the hope for a museum facility in the old town was deeply resented.

The Smith Institute first opened to the public on 11 August 1874. It was an occasion for great celebration in Stirling: the shops in the town closed at noon to allow people to attend the opening. At the opening ceremony, Provost Christie refuted criticism of the location by pointing out that a "five or ten minutes walk would bring any one to the Institute from the most distant part of the Burgh" and that the site was chosen on environmental grounds, "free from the noise and bustle and free from the dirt, dust and smoke, so that the students of art, science and literature could pursue their studies there unmolested and free from annoyance."

=== Early years ===
The first Smith curator was Alexander Croall (1804–1885), a native of Angus who acquired a national reputation as a natural historian and who was also the first curator of Derby City Museum before his appointment to Stirling. As a young man, Croall had trained himself in botany through his frequent field trips. In 1855, Sir William Hooker commissioned Croall to prepare a herbarium of the plants of Braemar for Queen Victoria. Croall is remembered for his standard four volume work British Sea Weeds: Nature Printed published in 1860 and illustrated by W. G. Johnston. Such was his passion for sea weed that he had the nickname ‘Roosty Tangle.’

Working with Stirling High School art master Leonard Baker, Croall mounted an exhibition of contemporary art in 1878. Out of this grew the Stirling Fine Art Association. Croall also established the Stirling Field Club whose members helped build up the collections of the Smith Institute. In the early years, the Field Club met in the Smith and the successes of the museum are recorded in the printed transactions of the society 1878-1938.

When Croall died, the Trustees appointed his son-in-law James Sword, who had been working in the County Council Office, as curator. During Sword's curatorship (1885–1921), the specialist history and antiquities collections were built up through small but significant purchases and donations. Sword was a keen natural historian and sportsman with skills in taxidermy. Sword created the large collection of stuffed birds and animals and put together the collection of communion tokens. He also did much to improve the grounds, making pavements, concrete kerbings, and bases for the iron railings.

=== Stirling Fine Art Association exhibitions ===
A regular feature of the Smith's programme between 1881 and 1938 was the three yearly Stirling Fine Art Association Exhibitions. There were eighteen of these exhibitions in all, usually running from January to March. Many of the best known names in the Scottish art world exhibited at the Smith, including Cadell, McTaggart, Bessie MacNicol, Robert Gemmell Hutchison and Anne Redpath. The local artistic community included William Kennedy, Joseph Denovan Adam, Nellie Harvey, D. Y. Cameron, Henry and Isobel Morley, and stained glass designer Isobel Goudie. In 1910, Stirling architects Crawford and Fraser exhibited their drawings for Henry Morley's new house "The Gables." Other architectural plans and cartoons for stained glass windows were exhibited from time to time.

The triennial exhibitions were accompanied by a lecture and concert programme. The speakers and musicians were accommodated on a platform at the back of the large gallery. It was at these concerts that the work of the young Muir Mathieson was premiered. Many of the concerts in the 1930s were organised by Adam R. Lennox, musical director of the Stirling Operatic Society and organist of Chalmers' Church.

The Constitution of the Stirling Fine Art Association allowed the purchase of works of art to be added to the Smith collections from any surplus funds after all expenses incurred by the exhibition had been defrayed. This rarely occurred.

=== World Wars ===
The work of the museum was halted in 1914 with the outbreak of World War I and the requisitioning of the building for military purposes. From 1914-1921 and 1939-1948, the Smith ceased to operate as a museum and was instead used for the billeting of troops and other military purposes. The Smith building experienced significant damage during these periods. The damage list of 1919 included damaged front steps, broken and bent railings; choked valley gutters leading to dampness, water ingress and damage to the collections stacked high in the side rooms; broken windows, plaster, flooring, lamps, ventilation grating; eleven sheets of roof glass broken; flooring stained with oil and urine; doors and door furniture removed; damage to the boiler. The public were banned from coming near the building.

Paintings had to be crammed into the museum spaces to leave the two large galleries free for troop accommodation. There were no washing facilities, even for the eating utensils of the troops. Food was served through hatches burst in the west wall from a field kitchen erected in the grounds. The wrought iron railings were removed from the front of the building to aid the war effort in the 1940s.

The Smith's third curator, Joseph McNaughton served from 1921 to the derequisitioning of the Smith in 1947. With the aid of his nephew Duncan, he managed to publish a catalogue of the collections in 1934.

==== Artillery ====
Gallery Three in particular was used during both wars to billet troops especially when they were training on the King's Park. It must have been the practice to clean weapons and ammunition while there as live rounds of Lee–Enfield and 707 bullets had been found over the years. When Gallery 3 was about to be reconditioned, the central heating duct in the middle of the room had to be carefully searched to remove any remaining ammunition. The workmen reported having found some more ammunition as a result of this search and subsequent works.

=== 1959-1990 ===
During the years of the Great Depression, the money left by Smith failed to return much in interest. The building began to develop problems, made worse by the Second World War. By the 1960s, the underfunding and lack of development was serious.

In 1970, the Trustees, on the advice of the Keeper of the National Museum of Antiquities, signed over the original Stirling Heads to the Department of Ancient Monuments (now Historic Scotland). It was feared that these important early portraits were in danger because of the condition of the Smith and that they should be returned to their original home, Stirling Castle. The National Museum trustees have not elected to return the three Stirling heads in their collection to Stirling Castle. Additional proposals sought from other experts recommended the dispersal of the art collection, and the use of the history collections for exhibitions in various historic buildings in the upper town.

At one point, the building was in such poor condition that the only viable option seemed to be demolition. In 1973, the Friends of the Smith, a body of concerned citizens, was formed to save the building and its collections. Working in partnership with the local authority, they effected a rescue package.

Elsewhere in Scotland, museums and galleries were the responsibility of the district councils. In Stirling, the situation with the Smith was so serious that the regional council was persuaded to enter into the partnership, providing half of the public funding package. The Joint Committee of Stirling District Council and Central Regional Council was the Smith's governing body from 1975 until the disappearance of the regional council in 1996. During those years, it was the sole regional council in Scotland to invest money in a local museum and gallery.

A major programme of refurbishment was undertaken in the mid-1980s and the collections were moved out to various stores during the contract period. Some of the cost-cutting measures undertaken by the original builders came to light. In 1984, during renovation of Gallery 2, it was discovered that the Victorian builders had built a wall only two bricks wide but forty feet high. The main roof beams were able to support the roof and had in fact been holding the wall in place for 110 years. The entire wall had to be demolished and a new wall six bricks wide with a five-foot foundation rebuilt in its place.

=== 1996-2005 ===
From 1996 to 1999, John Scott was Chair of the Friends. During this time, the Smith won one of the first Woodmansterne Awards for the conservation of the Hugh Howard portrait of composer Arcangelo Corelli (1653–1713). Scott was also involved as part of the team constructing the William Wallace exhibition of 1997, the Victorian Stirling exhibition in 1998, and the Stirling Story exhibition in 2000.

Margaret Gray's time as Chairperson was distinguished with the production and delivery of Ailie's Garden, the biodiversity and play area at the rear of the Smith in 2002. A membership drive, assisted with the first colour-printed Friends leaflet, took the membership to over 900, a significant achievement for a small museum. Moira Lawson, who became Chair in 2004, was heavily involved in the fundraising and project management for Ailie's Garden and the fundraising for the purchase of the Wallace painting.

=== 2006 onwards ===
John J. Coutts was Poet in Residence from 2015 to 2021.

== The Smith Building ==
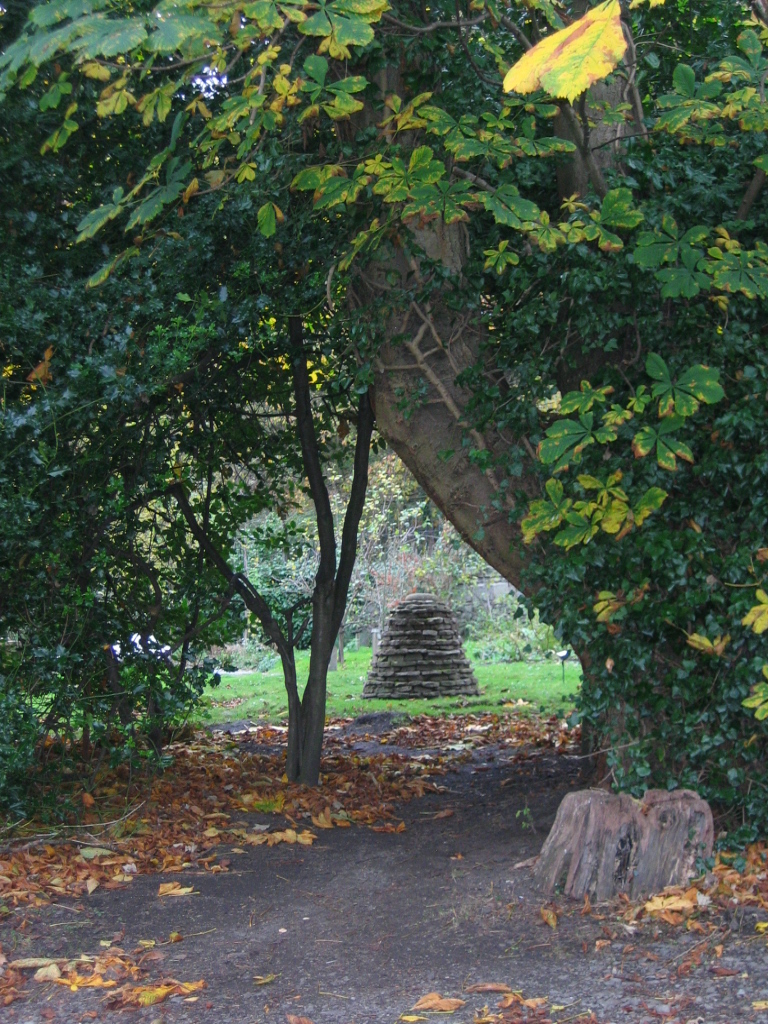
Another view of the Cairn Garden, Stirling Art Gallery

Smith had intended to supervise the construction of the museum building personally. Many corners were cut in the construction, and it is evident from the idiosyncratic structure of the roof that the architect, John Lessels (1808–1883) of Edinburgh, had little direct input.

Most of the building material came from the Raploch Quarry on the northern side of the Castle escarpment, now the site of the Fire Station. Additional sandstone came from a quarry at Dunmore.

The frontage to Dumbarton Road has a tetra style (four pillared) Doric portico. The tympanum carries two relief carvings of the Stirling seal, the wolf on the left side and the Castle on the right. In the centre is a coat of arms purporting to be that of Thomas Stuart Smith, but the heraldic arrangement is unknown and has never been entered at the Court of the Lord Lyon. The inscription on the entablature below reads: "The Smith Institute, erected and endowed with funds bequeathed by Thomas Stuart Smith of Glassingall Perthshire." There are six steps to the front door. The wrought metal handrail by Phil Johnston of Ratho Byres Forge was added in 2000. At either side of the steps are two plinths for sculpture and there is an empty sculpture niche on the right side of the building.

The frontage to Victoria Road and the Back Walk is 218 feet (66 m) in length and is broken by two gables having three-light Venetian windows which are surmounted by pediments. The pediments are inscribed with bronze lettering: "Erected 1873. Trustees George Christie, Provost of Stirling, J. W. Barty Dunblane, A. W. Cox Nottingham and John Lessels Edinburgh Architect."

The west side of the building has a blank wall with no windows-this being the architectural interpretation of the Trust Deed of having "space on either side for contingent additions." The back or north wall has three access doors added in 1985-7 during the refurbishment of the building.

The Smith had residential accommodation for the curator and this was occupied by a succession of staff until 1959. When the building was requisitioned by the army in 1914, the curator and his family remained in residence. A separate entrance to the curator's house was created by the army through enlarging a window. This is now the staff entrance and the former domestic premises are now offices.

There were five public areas to the Smith in 1874. On the left of the entrance was the Reading Room and Library. This was a substantial room measuring 50 by 28 feet (8.5 m), with an elaborate plasterwork scheme on the ceiling. The ceiling had three sections, each with 15 panels containing casts of the Stirling Heads, alternated with casts of the Arms of Stirling, the monogram of Thomas Stuart Smith and the date of the building. The woodwork was stained to look like oak whilst the groundwork of each panel was in turquoise blue, the whole being enclosed in bands of soft red. The Library walls were in "drab Etruscan" to harmonise with the ceiling. When the Library moved to the new Carnegie building at the Corn Exchange in 1904, this became the natural history room. The plaster ceiling (by John Craigie of Stirling who had the contract for all the Smith plasterwork) was lost in the dry rot outbreak and removed in 1974. This room, renamed the Ballengeich Room or Gallery 1 was the first area of the Smith to be refurbished (1977). The room is at present used for temporary exhibitions and the Smith Café.

To the right of the entrance was the Small Museum, used for displaying the collection of original Stirling Heads and other Scottish antiquities. It was later used for ethnographical displays and in 1984 was fitted out as the Lecture Room. It is used extensively by community groups. The large stained glass window from Springbank House was resited here in 2000, together with other stained glass panels and the original plasters by Albert Hemstock Hodge (1876–1918) for the Stirling Burns Monument.

The centre gallery, Gallery 2, was conceived as the watercolour gallery and was top lit. It is now used for temporary exhibitions. The large gallery, Gallery 3, was the gallery for the oil paintings of the foundation collection and remained so until 1970. It was also top lit. At present, it houses the Stirling Story exhibition. In 1874, both of these galleries were painted dark maroon with the coves in green.

The final area was the General Museum. On the east side of the building with its face to Stirling, it was lit by eight large windows and housed the museum collection. After the difficulties with the building encountered in the 1970s, this area became the storage area and is no longer accessible to the public.

When the Smith first opened to the public, almost equal amounts space were devoted to the gallery and museum. There was no provision for workshop or storage space and the anticipated expansion on the 2-acre (8,100 m^{2}) site did not happen. The pressing need for storage and workshop space has resulted in the loss of a third of the public area for that purpose and most of the fine art collection is at present confined to storage. The pressure for temporary exhibition space keeps Galleries 1 and 2 filled with constantly changing exhibitions, mainly by contemporary artists. The occupation of the Gallery 3, the largest exhibition space, with museum display is a temporary measure until new storage can be found and the splendour of this huge picture gallery restored to its original purpose.

The work of building the Smith was undertaken mainly by local contractors with a couple of exceptions. Sinclair of Edinburgh had the contract for the mason work and the decoration was undertaken by Bonnar and Carfrae, also of Edinburgh and one of the foremost in their field. John A. T. Bonnar, worked on the Smith contract and lived in Stirling. A box painted with an intricate decorative scheme that belonged to him, but was possibly executed by his older relative William Bonnar RSA (1800–1853), was presented to the Smith by his descendant, film-maker David Bonnar Thomson.
