= Thomas Stuart Smith =

Scottish painter and philanthropist (1815–1869)

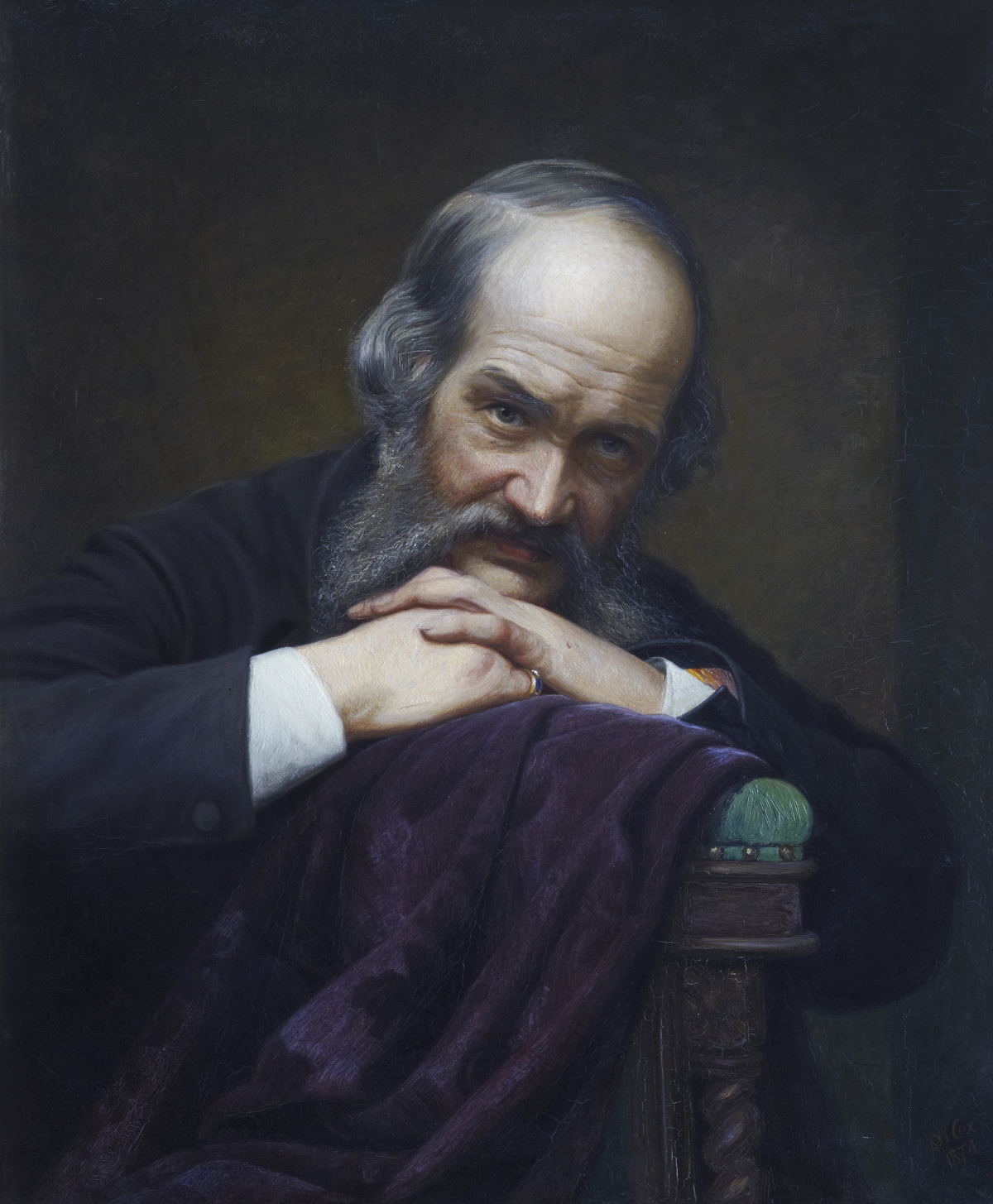
- 1874 portrait by Alfred Wilson Cox
- Born: 1815; Scotland
- Died: 1869 (aged 53–54); Avignon
- Known for: philanthropy

Thomas Stuart Smith (1815–1869) was a Scottish painter and philanthropist known for creating what is now called the Stirling Smith Museum and Art Gallery, located in Stirling, Scotland.

== Life ==
Thomas Stuart Smith was born in 1815 as the secret illegitimate nephew of Alexander Smith, who had the estate at Glassingall, Dunblane, Scotland. Alexander's brother, the father, sent Thomas to a school in France whilst he conducted his business in Canada and the East Indies. In 1831 no fees were paid and Thomas thought his father must have died. He returned to England, when he and his uncle learned of each other for the first time. They did not meet, but Alexander advanced sums to him from time to time.

Smith started working as a tutor. He later became interested in painting from an Italian master painter whom he met whilst serving as a traveling tutor to a British family. His uncle Alexander supplied funding so that he could travel and paint in Italy starting in 1840.

By the end of that decade, Smith was having his work accepted by both the Salon des Beaux Arts in Paris and the Royal Academy in London. His first painting at the Royal Academy was bought by Professor Owen, an acquaintance of Edwin Landseer, who was said to have admired it repeatedly.

== Inheritance ==
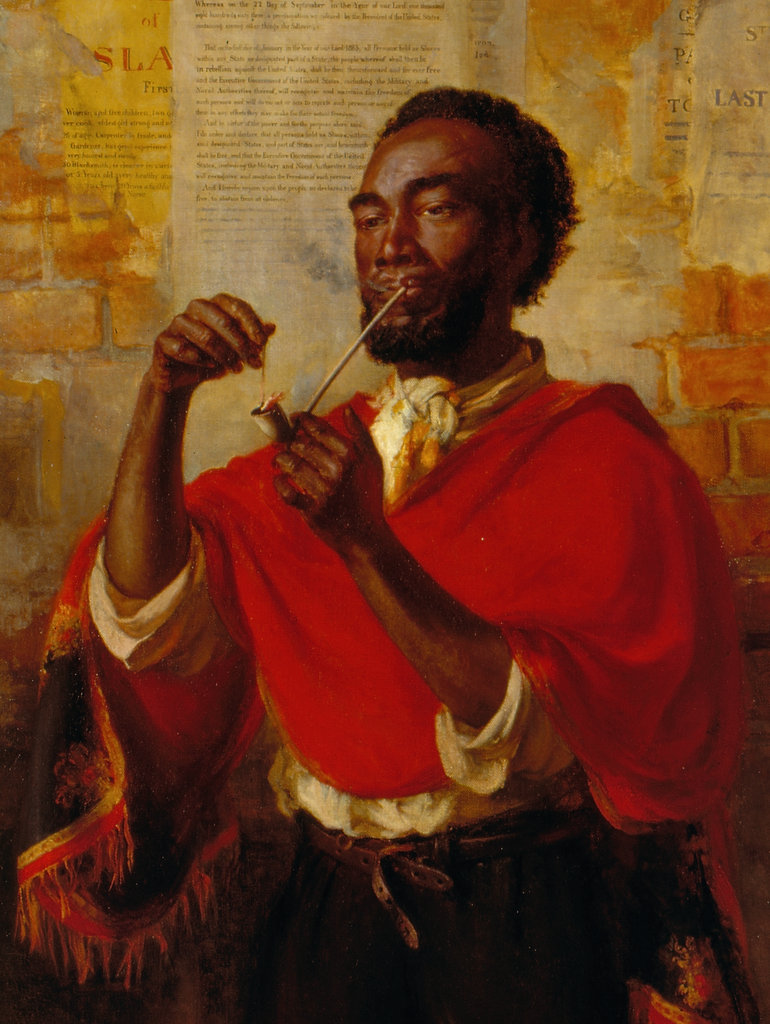
The Pipe of Freedom, 1869, Stirling Smith Art Gallery and Museum

In 1849 Alexander Smith died intestate. Thomas took possession of the family's estate in 1857 after vying at great expense with eighteen other aspirants. During the eight years that he had waited in hope of his inheritance, he taught art at the Nottingham School of Design. James Orrock, the collector and watercolourist, was one of his pupils; he commented on how Smith could paint anything. Smith was known to the Barbizon School of realistic painting, including the animal painters Constant Troyon and John Phillip RA.

Having gained the estate, he kept it just six years. He sold it and used the funds to move to London. His legal costs had been high. His new fortune enabled him to create an art collection at a studio in Fitzroy Square that included his own work. He decided to create an Institute in Stirling to house his new collection. He drew up plans for a library, museum, and a reading room and he offered £5,000 to the council if they could donate a site within two years. He signed the trust into existence in November 1869 with himself, James Barty, the Provost of Stirling and A.W.Cox, a fellow artist, as trustees. He did not see his plans fulfilled as he died the next month in Avignon.

== Legacy ==
Smith is known primarily for founding the Smith Institute, which is now called the Stirling Smith Museum and Art Gallery. Smith also has hundreds of paintings in public ownership.

Two of Smith's works that are still thought to be important are portraits he painted of black men. Unlike other depictions at the time, in which black people were included as servants, Smith's portraits Fellah of Kinneh and The Pipe of Freedom show his subjects as independent and free; they were painted to celebrate the abolition of slavery in America in 1865 following the American Civil War. He also did a smaller painting called The Cuban Cigarette, which has a similar presence. The Pipe of Freedom shows a man lighting a pipe; behind him a slave sale notice has been partially covered by an abolition notice.
