= The Pipe of Freedom =

1869 Painting by Thomas Stuart Smith

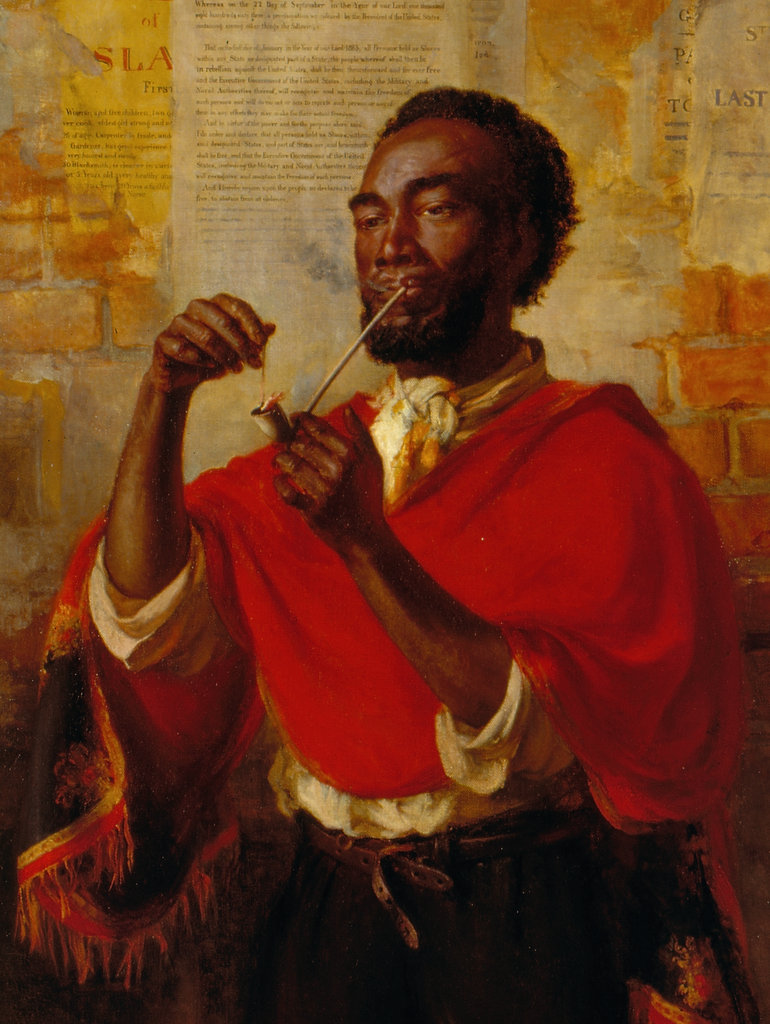
Thomas Stuart Smith, The Pipe of Freedom, 1869, Stirling Smith Art Gallery and Museum

The Pipe of Freedom is an 1869 oil painting by Thomas Stuart Smith, depicting a black man lighting a pipe. The Royal Academy of Arts declined to include it in their 1869 exhibition, but Smith exhibited it with other rejected works nearby. Smith died on 31 December 1869, and bequeathed the painting to the Stirling Smith Art Gallery and Museum, the art gallery that he had founded in Stirling.

The painting measures 106.8 cm × 78.7 cm (42.0 in × 31.0 in). It is a three-quarter length portrait of a black man lighting a pipe of tobacco. He is standing bareheaded, wearing dark trousers with a leather belt, a white shirt with a white cloth tied around this neck, and a red cloak with black and gold details draped over his shoulders. He is standing in front of a brick wall, to which are pasted the remains of several posters, including a yellow poster referring to a slave auction, over which is pasted a copy of the Emancipation Proclamation – "all persons held as slaves within any State ... shall be then, thenceforward and forever free", which came into effect in areas occupied by the Union from January 1, 1863, and was implemented across the southern states of the US in December 1865, after the Union defeated the Confederacy in the American Civil War. The man is evidently enjoying his newly granted freedom. The subject was unusual at the time, when it would be usual to depict black people in subservient roles, for example as servants.

It was one of two portraits of black men that Smith submitted for exhibition at the Royal Academy in 1869. The other, Fellah of Kinneh, was exhibited unobtrusively, but The Pipe of Freedom was rejected (on political grounds, Smith claimed). He exhibited it, along with works by other artists that had also been rejected, at an unofficial "Select Supplementary Exhibition" that Smith helped to organise nearby (similar to the Parisian Salon des Refusés).

Smith had founded the Stirling Smith Art Gallery and Museum, and donated the painting to the gallery on his death in 1869.
