= Thomas Bonnar =

Scottish interior designer and architect

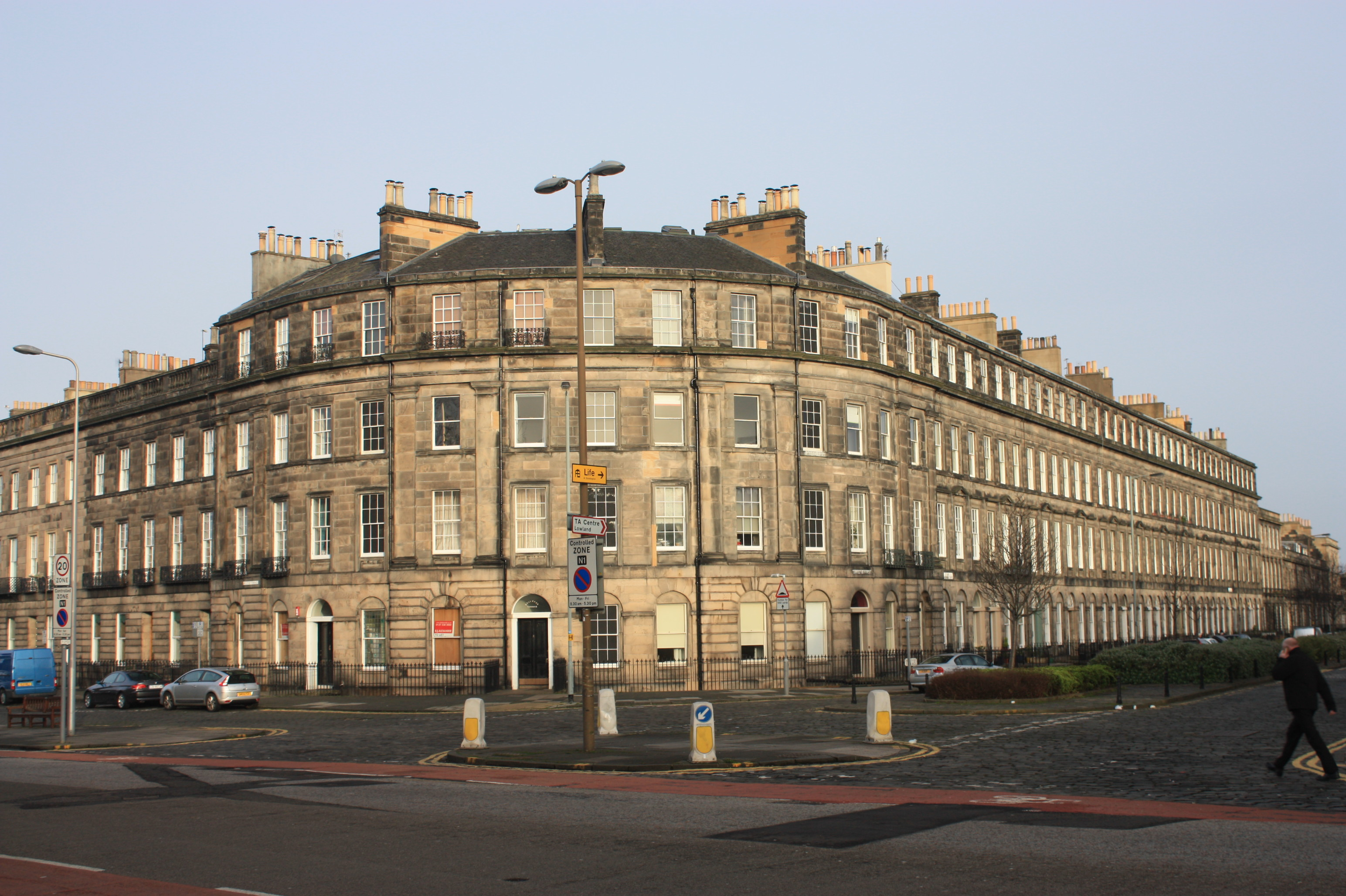
East Claremont Street by Thomas Bonnar

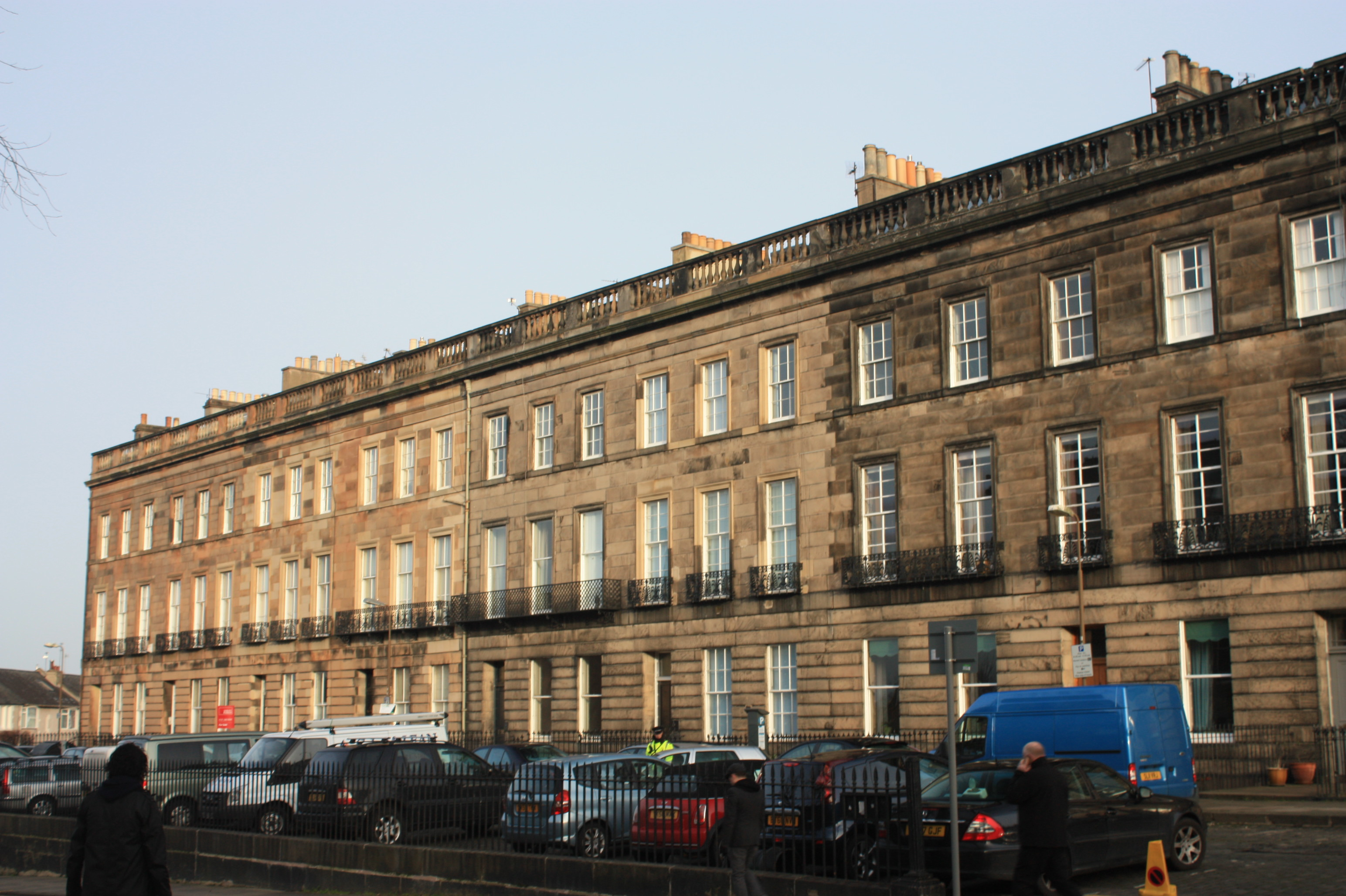
Bellevue Terrace designed by Thomas Bonnar

Thomas Bonnar (d. 1847) was a Scottish interior designer and architect of note, working in the Edinburgh area. He is particularly remembered for his outstanding ceilings.

Thomas was the father of the artist William Bonnar (1800–1853) and the engraver Thomas Bonnar (1810–1873), who collaborated with each other on several works.

The group are also known by the family company name of Bonnar & Co.

== Life ==
Bonnar was born in Edinburgh around 1770, the son of John Bonnar who had created the ceilings in Penicuik House. His family lived in a new house at 6 South St David Street during his teenage years.

He was appointed as a burgess of the city in 1795 and a "sworn measurer" in 1807 and Superintendent of Works for the city in 1809, operating from the Magdalene Chapel in the Cowgate. From 1810 he acted as architect and surveyor to George Heriot’s School. He lost all public posts in January 1819 due to a bungled execution on 30 December (part of his wide scope of duties) which ended in a public riot.

A house at 7 Ann Street is known as "Thomas Bonnar’s House" but there is no record of his living there, but he is responsible for its fine interior decoration. "Thomas Bonar", Superintendent of Works is listed as living at Greenside on Leith Walk in the early 19th century.

He did many fine and many unique interiors, including St Bernard’s Well at Stockbridge.

George Heriot's School replaced him with Alexander Black in 1833.

He retired in 1832 and died in 1847.

== Family ==
His daughter Elizabeth married George Meikle Kemp.

== Works ==
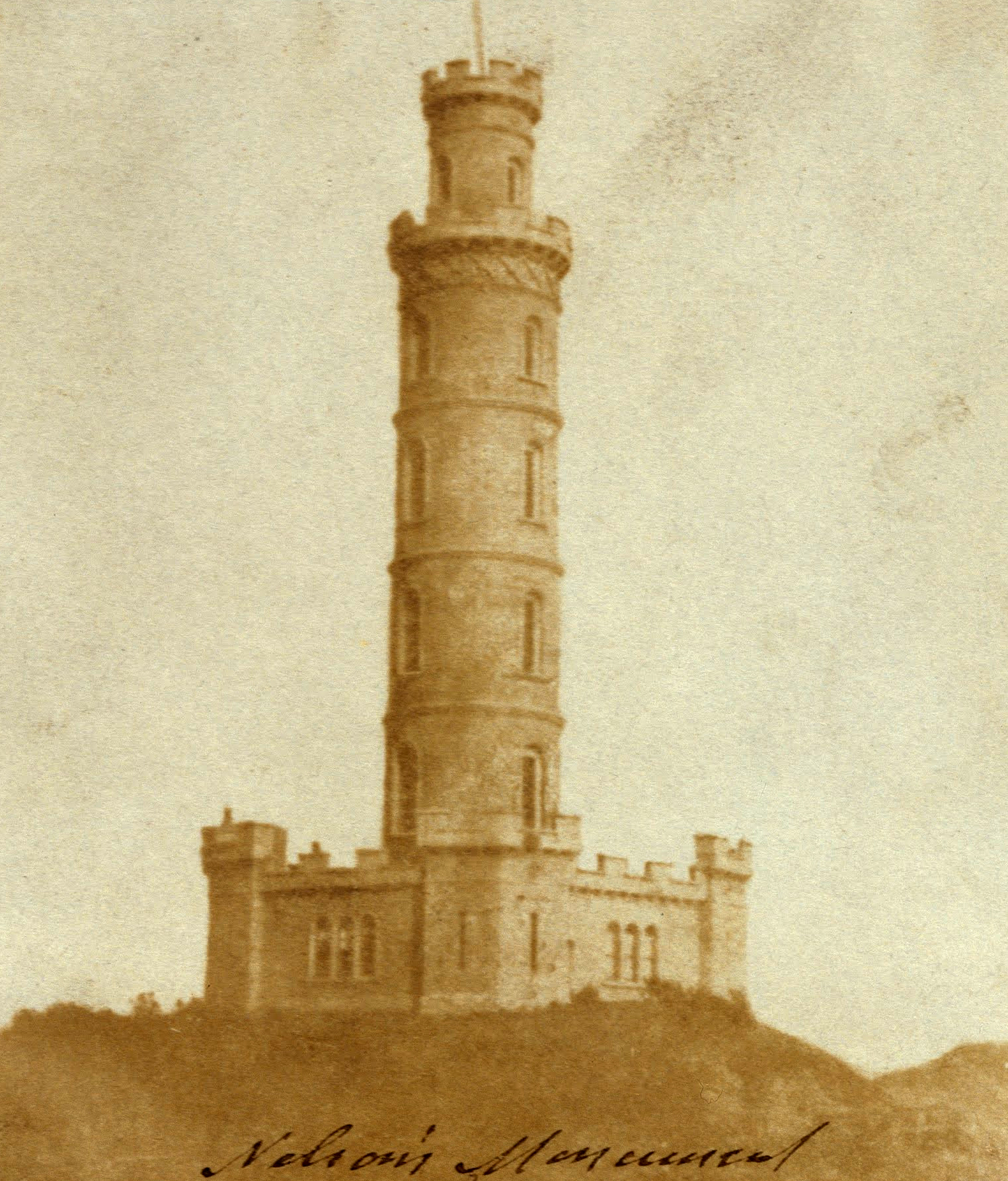
1843 photo of Nelson Monument by Robert Adamson

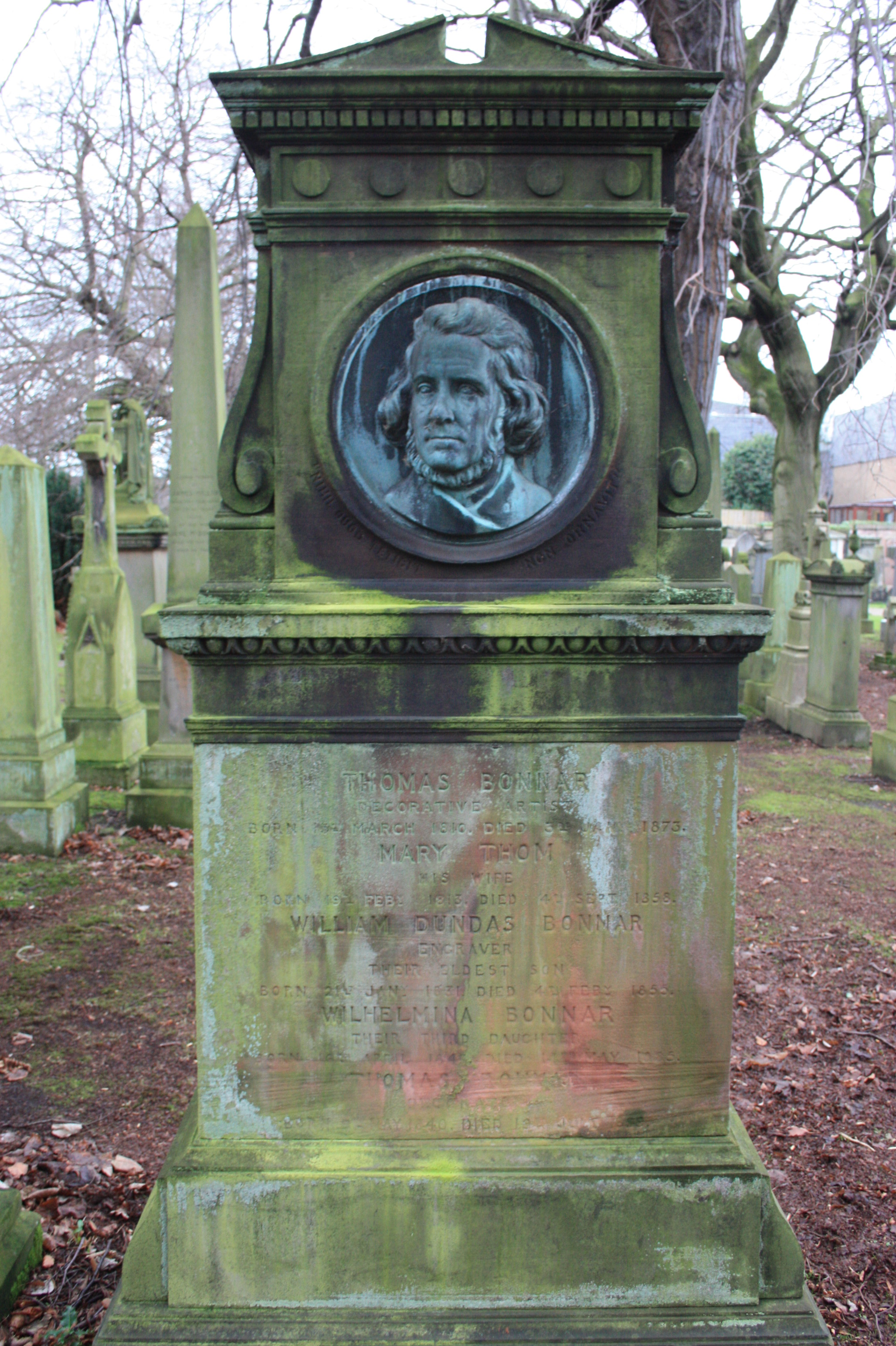
The grave of Thomas Bonnar (1810-1873) Dean Cemetery

- Completion of Robert Burn's Nelson’s Monument on Calton Hill (1814-1816)
- Original layout of New Calton Burial Ground (1816–1817), completed by Thomas Brown)
- Completion of Drummond Place (1816–1817)
- 1 to 13 Hermitage Place, Leith (1817–1825)
- Gardener’s House, Queen Street Gardens (1819) demolished
- Bellevue Crescent (1819–1832) southern half only – northern half unbuilt until 1880s.
- 4-15 Gloucester Place (1822–1824)
- 42-54 London Street (1823)
- 1-85 East Claremont Street (1824)
- Atholl Crescent, Atholl Place and the north side of Torphichen Street (1824–1826)
- Bellevue Terrace (1825) building works overseen by Alexander Black, northern section never built
- Barony Street (1829–1847) building works continued from 1847 by Alexander Black.

== Thomas Bonnar (the younger) ==
Thomas Bonnar the younger was born in Edinburgh on 4 April 1810. He followed in his father’s footsteps as an interior designer and artist but did not venture into architecture.

He died on 2 February 1873 and is buried with his wife Mary Thom (1813–1858) in a crowded section of Dean Cemetery east of the new Dean Gallery entrance and north-east of the distinctive pyramid therein with a strange back-to-back monument with his son Thomas (1838–1896), designed by David Watson Stevenson. His sons, engraver William Dundas Bonnar (1831–1855) and Thomas Bonnar (d. 1899) are buried with them.

His interiors include:

- Drawing-room, Newbattle Abbey
- Drawing-room, Mortonhall House
- Office interior for Thomas Nelson in Paternoster Row, London
- Ceilings for Thomas Nelson in his Edinburgh home, St. Leonard’s

Thomas in turn also had a son named Thomas (1838–1896), who was operational largely in the 1890s and decorated some ceilings at Falkland Palace and Liberton House and Riddles Court on the Lawnmarket.
