= John J. Coutts =

Scottish poet

John J. Coutts (born 1934) is a Scottish poet, preacher, and broadcaster. He served as the Poet in Residence at Stirling Smith Art Gallery and Museum from 2015 to 2021.

== Early life and education ==
Coutts was born in 1934 in Clydebank, Scotland. He earned a first-class degree in English language and literature from Lincoln College, Oxford.

== Career ==
Coutts pursued his career in Nigeria and England.

Coutts has translated sections of The Complete Works of Alexander Pushkin in English (Milner and Co, 1999), including the epic poem Poltava and various lyrical pieces. In 2010, The Handsel Press published his poetry collection titled Lines of a Lifetime.

His theatrical works include Shakespeare in Stirling, a play that imagines William Shakespeare visiting Scotland. The play was part of the Royal Shakespeare Company's Open Stage project and was performed by the Riverside Drama Club. Coutts also created A Box of Surprises, a solo performance piece that combines poetry and storytelling. He also writes scripts and performance poetry for young audiences.

From 1953 to 1954, Coutts studied Russian and played rugby at the Joint Services School for Linguists. In the 1980s, he briefly held the position of Keston's representative in Moscow.

Coutts has contributed to BBC Radio Scotland's Thought for the Day program. In 2015, he published his autobiography, Was That Me? Memories of a Long Spent Youth.

In September 2015, Coutts was appointed Poet in Residence at The Smith Art Gallery and Museum by its then-director, Elspeth King. He organized the monthly Poetry Roundabout at the museum, an open event where participants can present their own poetry or share their favorite poems, until 2021.

In 2017, together with David Smith, Coutts compiled a book of poetry themed around the museum's cat, Oswald. Titled Oswald's Invitation: Oswald the Cat’s Book of Poems for Fun and Finding Out, the book was distributed to every school within the Stirling Council area.

Coutts is a lifelong member of the Salvation Army.

== Awards and recognition ==
- 2017: National Drama Award

== Bibliography ==
- Coutts, John J. (1965). Our Faith and theirs. Salvation Army. ISBN 0854120971.
- Coutts, John J. (1968). Prophets & Kings of Israel. Prentice Hall Press. ISBN 0582608155.
- Coutts, John J.; Thompson, P. E. S. (1973). How the Christian Faith began. Longman. ISBN 0582608856.
- Coutts, John J. (1977). The Salvationists. Mowbray. ISBN 0264660714.
- Coutts, John J. (1980). This we believe. Challenge Books. ISBN 0854122826.
- Coutts, John J. (1989). Jewish Lives. Living the faith. Oliver and Boyd. ISBN 0050043196.
- Coutts, John J. (1990). Sikh Lives. Living the faith. Oliver and Boyd. ISBN 0050045121.
- Coutts, John J. (1995). Celebrate Sikh Festivals. Heinemann/Raintree. ISBN 0431069638.
- Coutts, John J. (2007). Saints Alive! A Brief History of the Christian Church. Salvation Army. ISBN 0854127658.
- Coutts, John J. (2015). Was That Me? Memories of a Long Spent Youth. Haddington: The Handsel Press. ISBN 1871828880.
- Coutts, John J. (2020). Rap Around the Gospel. RG Publishing.
