= Thomas Brown (architect) =

Scottish architect

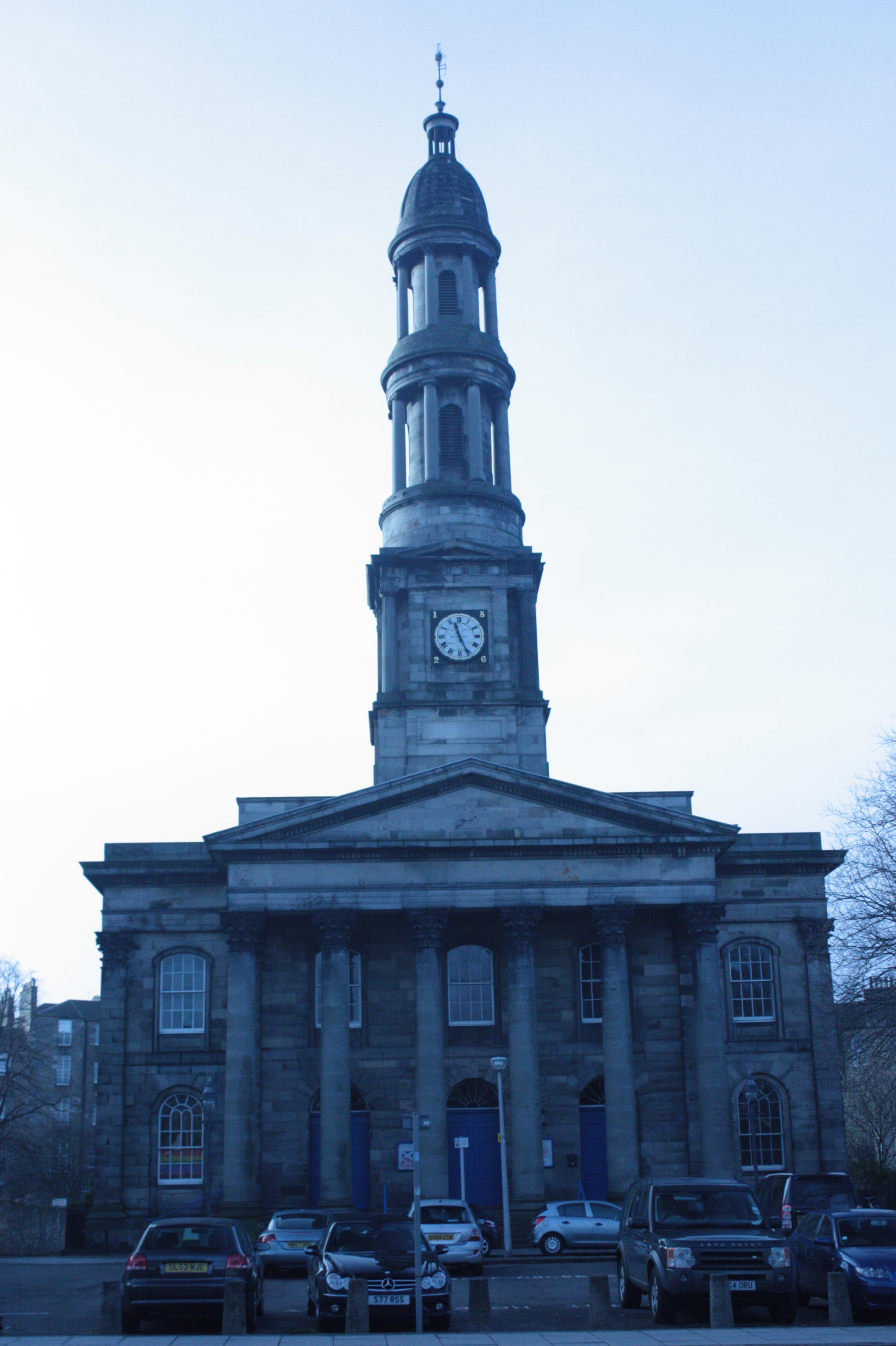
St Mary's Bellevue, Edinburgh by Thomas Brown

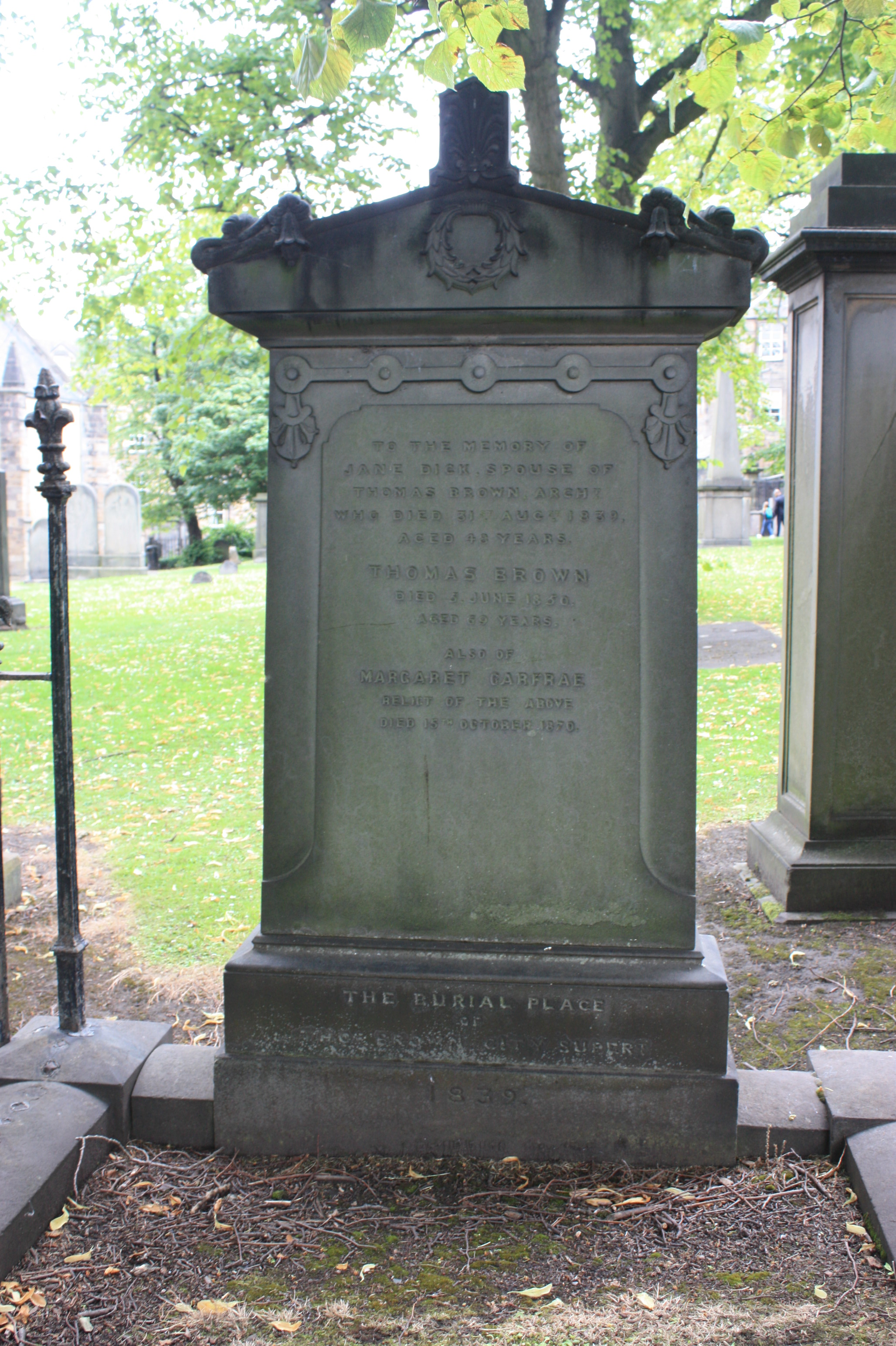
The grave of the architect Thomas Brown, Greyfriars Kirkyard, Edinburgh

Thomas Brown (1781 – 5 June 1850) was a Scottish architect in the early 19th century based in Edinburgh. He is best known for St. Mary's Church, Bellevue, Edinburgh, usually known as Bellevue Church.

== Life ==
Born in England, by 1809 Brown was an established surveyor and draughtsman. In 1817 he married Jane Dick Brown (d. 31 August 1839).

In February 1819 he received the prestigious appointment of Superintendent of the City Works in Edinburgh. This was during the city's major expansion to the north to create its New Town, and placed Brown on the then large salary of £250 per annum. In this role he replaced Thomas Bonnar who had been dismissed in early January 1819. Brown was largely responsible for the northern streets of the "Second New Town".

During his time as Superintendent he employed David Cousin as his assistant and Cousin replaced him upon his retirement. This role was run from the City Chambers.

In the 1830s his address was listed as 6 Argyle Square (demolished in the 1860s to create Chambers Street),

He retired in 1847 on a pension of £150 per annum.

He died at 54 George Square, aged 69, and is buried in Greyfriars Churchyard. The grave lies on the north–south path leading from the south-west corner of the church to the Covenanters Prison.

== Family ==
He was married twice, firstly to Jane Dick (1790-1839), then following her death to, Margaret Carfrae (d.1870). Both wives are buried with him.

== Trained by Brown ==
- John Cunningham

== Works ==
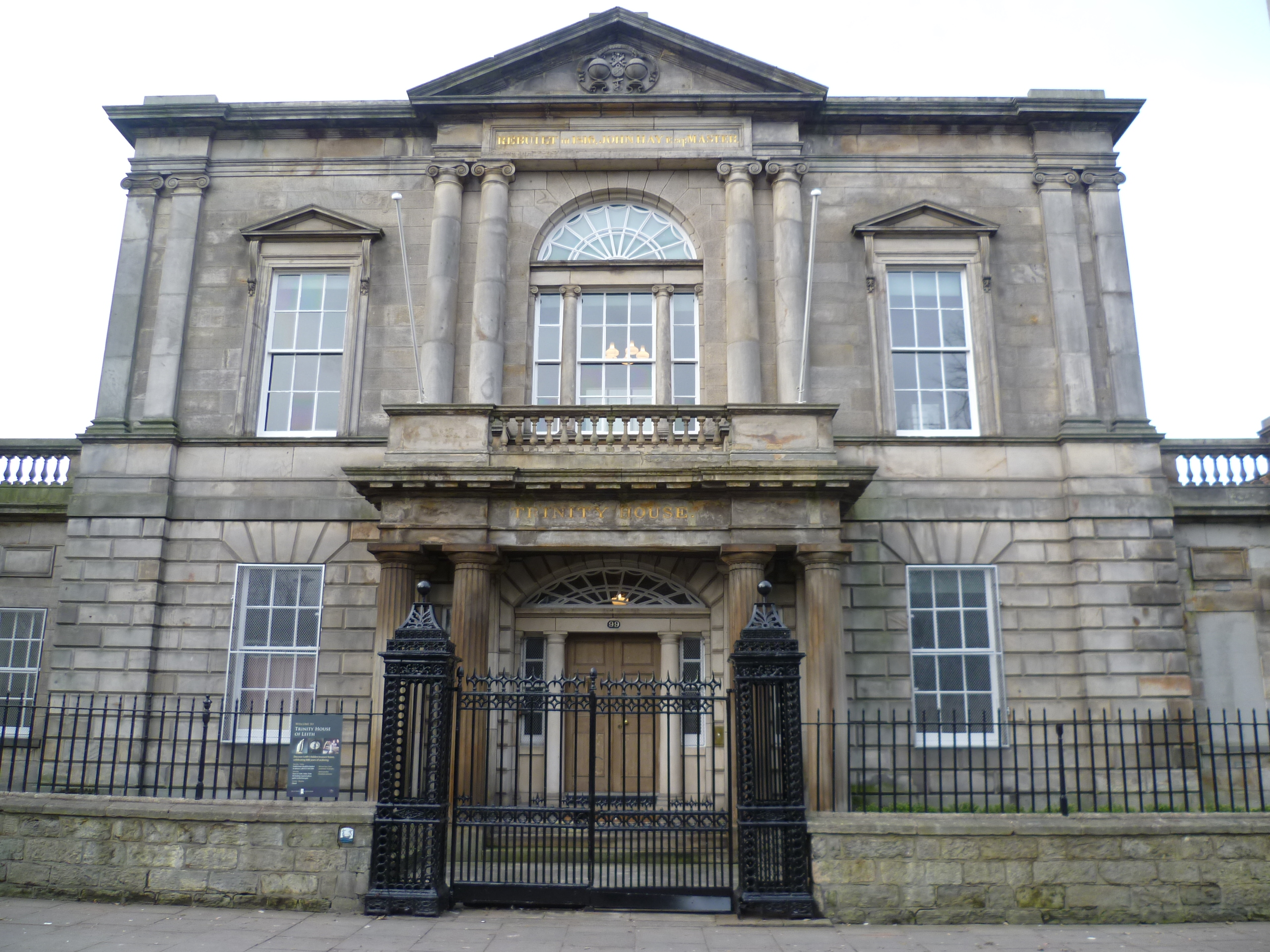
Trinity House, Kirkgate, Leith

His works include:

- Broughton Parish Church (1804)
- Exchange Buildings, Constitution Street, Leith (1809)
- Methodist Church, Nicolson Square, Edinburgh (1815)
- Trinity House, Leith (1816) (incorporating sections from 1555 including vaults)
- Terraced houses, Comely Bank, Stockbridge, Edinburgh (1817)
- United Presbyterian Church, North Leith (1818)
- London Street, Edinburgh redesign of south side (1819) (originally designed by Robert Reid
- Bellevue Crescent (north side) (1819) (following dismissal of Thomas Bonnar who designed the southern half).
- Completion of New Calton Cemetery (1819-1820) (designed by Thomas Bonnar in 1816–17)
- Fettes Row, Edinburgh (1821)
- Tenement, 14-17 Market Street (1821)
- United Presbyterian Church, Infirmary Street, Edinburgh (1822) commissioned by Rev George Paxton
- Layout and several detailed designs, villas, 5-57 Inverleith Row (1823-6)
- Cumberland Street (1823)
- 1-4 and 6-9 James Place Leith (1823) (renamed Links Gardens in 1922)
- St Marys Church, Bellevue, Edinburgh (1823-4) ("Bellevue Church")
- Tenements, 86-102 South Clerk Street, Edinburgh (1824)
- Bathgate Academy (1824) replaced in 1831
- Leith Prison, 75-79 Constitution Street (attaching the rear of Leith Police Station) (1824)
- Tenements, West Preston Street (1824)
- Trinity Crescent (1824-5)
- Houses, 3,4,5,6 West Newington Place (1825)
- Houses, east side of Newington Road (1825)
- Royal Crescent (1825) (an asymmetrical crescent, largely curved to avoid building on the huge hole in the ground immediately to the north)
- Corner tenement, 2/3 West Newington Place, 56 Newington Road (1825)
- Clarence Street, Stockbridge, corner blocks (1829)
- Tenement, 3-5 Hamilton Place, Stockbridge (1831)
- St. Giles Cathedral remodelling of nave (1842)
