= Millburn Church =

Ruined church in West Dunbartonshire, Scotland

Coordinates: 55.9760°N 4.5851°W

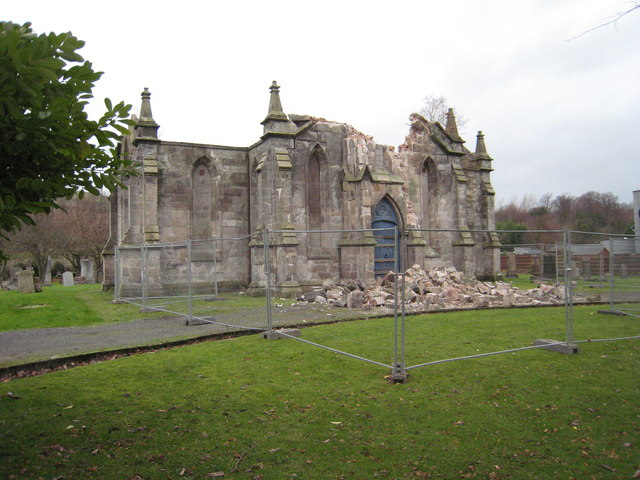

Millburn Church is a ruined former church in Renton, West Dunbartonshire, Scotland. It was built in 1845 for the Free Church of Scotland in the Gothic style. It is a category A listed building, and is on the Buildings at Risk Register for Scotland. The architect is thought to have been John Thomas Rochead, though it has also been attributed to George Meikle Kemp, architect of the Scott Monument. The church was disused by 1985, when it was threatened with demolition. It remained empty despite several plans for restoration, and the roof collapsed in the late 1990s. In 2006 a storm blew down the steeple of the building, and in 2009 a further application to demolish the building was lodged. The application was opposed locally, and was withdrawn in 2011. Two of Robert Burns' nieces are buried in the kirkyard.
