= Alexander Black (architect) =

Scottish architect (c.1790–1858)

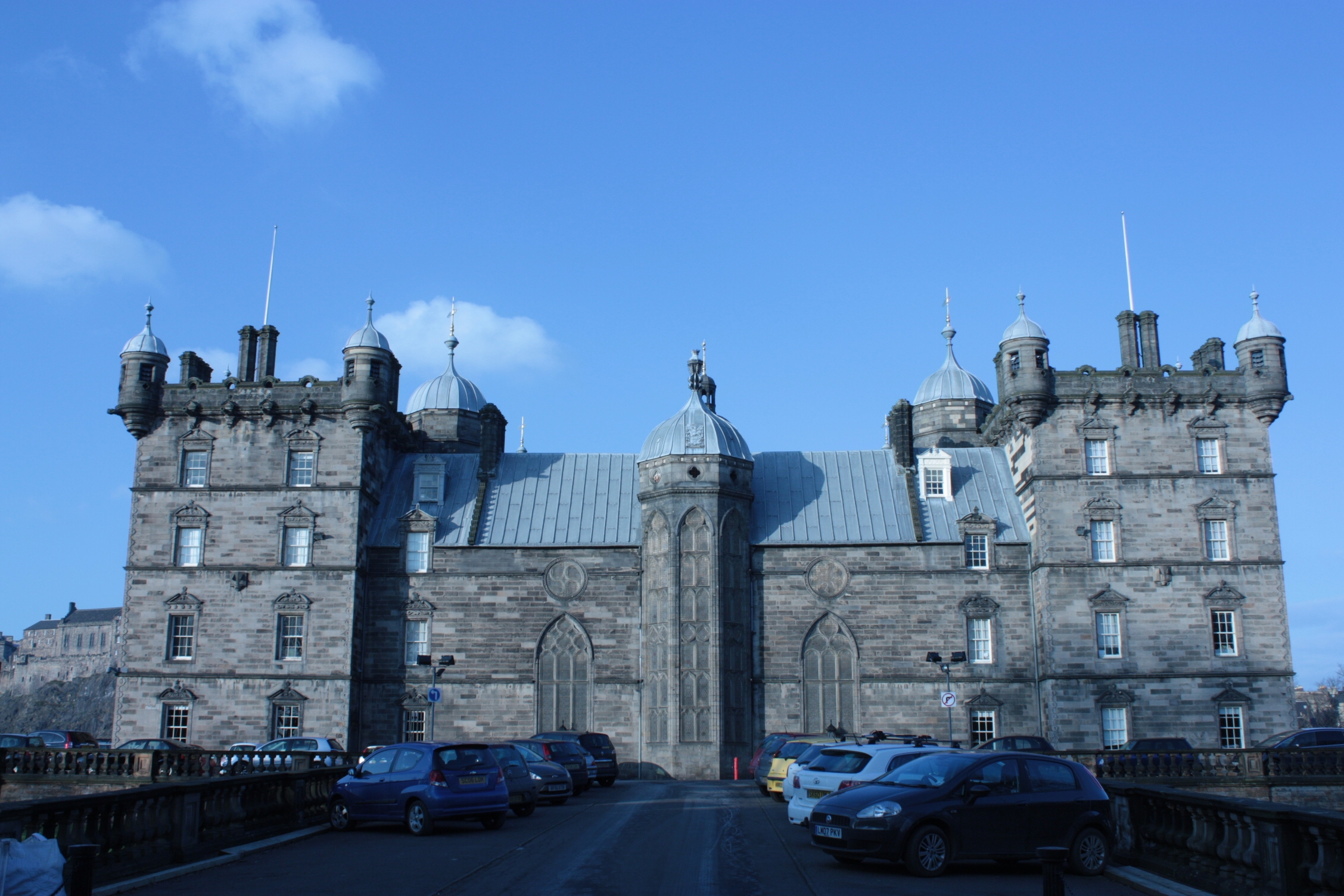
The remodelled south side of George Heriot's School

Alexander Black (c. 1790 – 19 February 1858) was a Scottish architect, born in Edinburgh around 1790 who is mainly known for his association with George Heriot’s School, where he acted as Superintendent of Works for most of his active life.

== Life ==
In 1832, he is shown as a surveyor living at 17 Calton Place in Edinburgh.

He operated as an architect for George Heriot's School from 1833, taking over from Thomas Bonnar on his retiral. He is particularly noteworthy for his Heriot Trust Schools, built by the school to serve the poorer children of Edinburgh.

His work is identifiable in its reuse of detailing from the main school particularly on the corner “quoins”. Two of the schools (Broughton Street and Cowgate/Pleasance) were notable for including their playground under the buildings behind an arcaded front, their being sited on tight urban plots with no space for conventional playgrounds. This device was later copied by Edward Robert Robson for some of his London School Board buildings, where land was equally tight.

He also feued many large areas of the city under Heriot Trust ownership notably the Henderson Row area, West Coates and Leith Walk. He was succeeded in his role by John Chesser.

In later life he lived at 19 Lauriston Street in the Tollcross area of Edinburgh.

He died on 19 February 1858 and is buried under a huge but simple stone sarcophagus on the edge of the south path in Dean Cemetery.

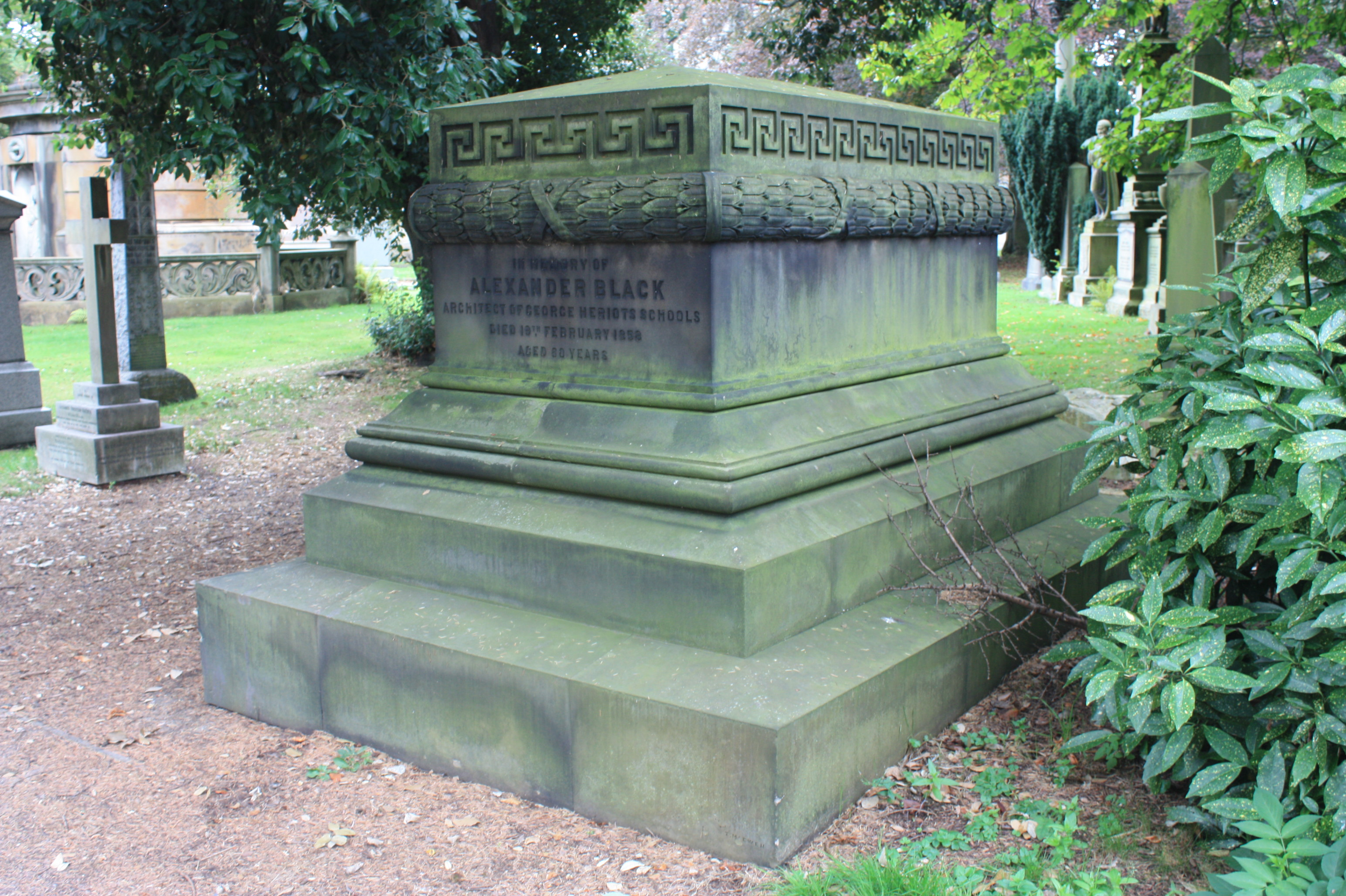
The grave of Alexander Black, Dean Cemetery

== List of works ==
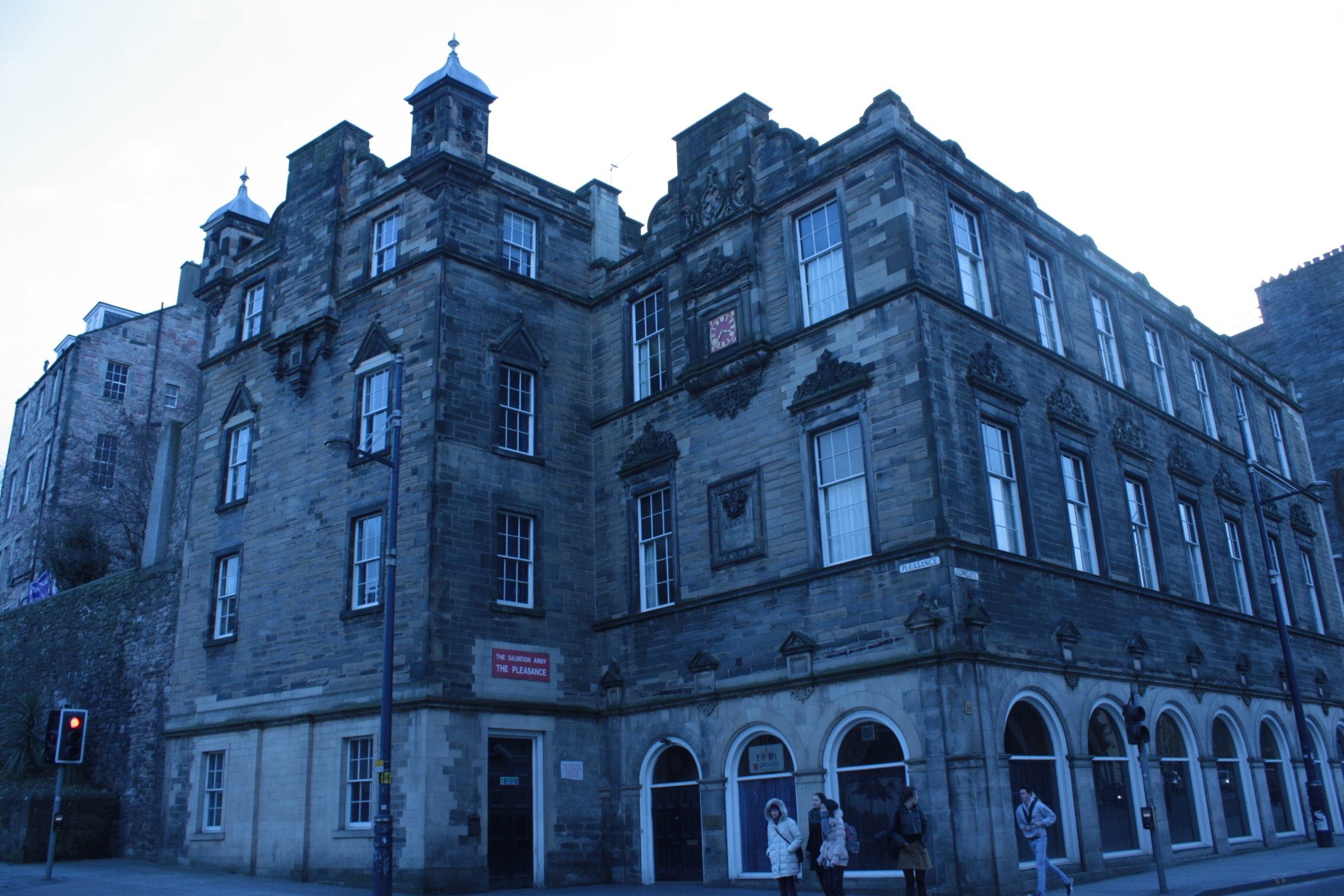
Heriot's Trust School Cowgate/Pleasance (now the Salvation Army)

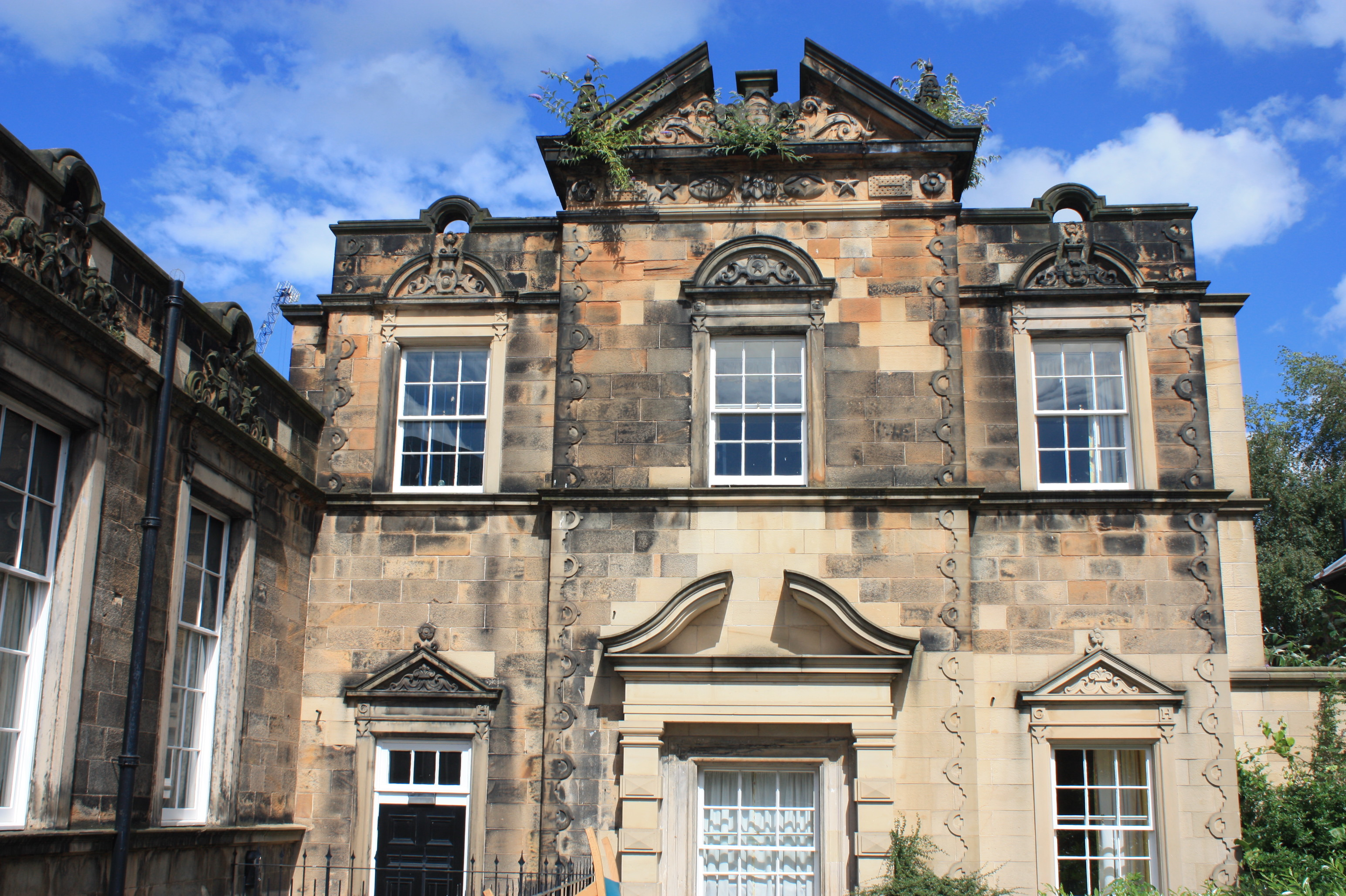
Rear entrance in High School Yards to Black's Heriot School on the Cowgate

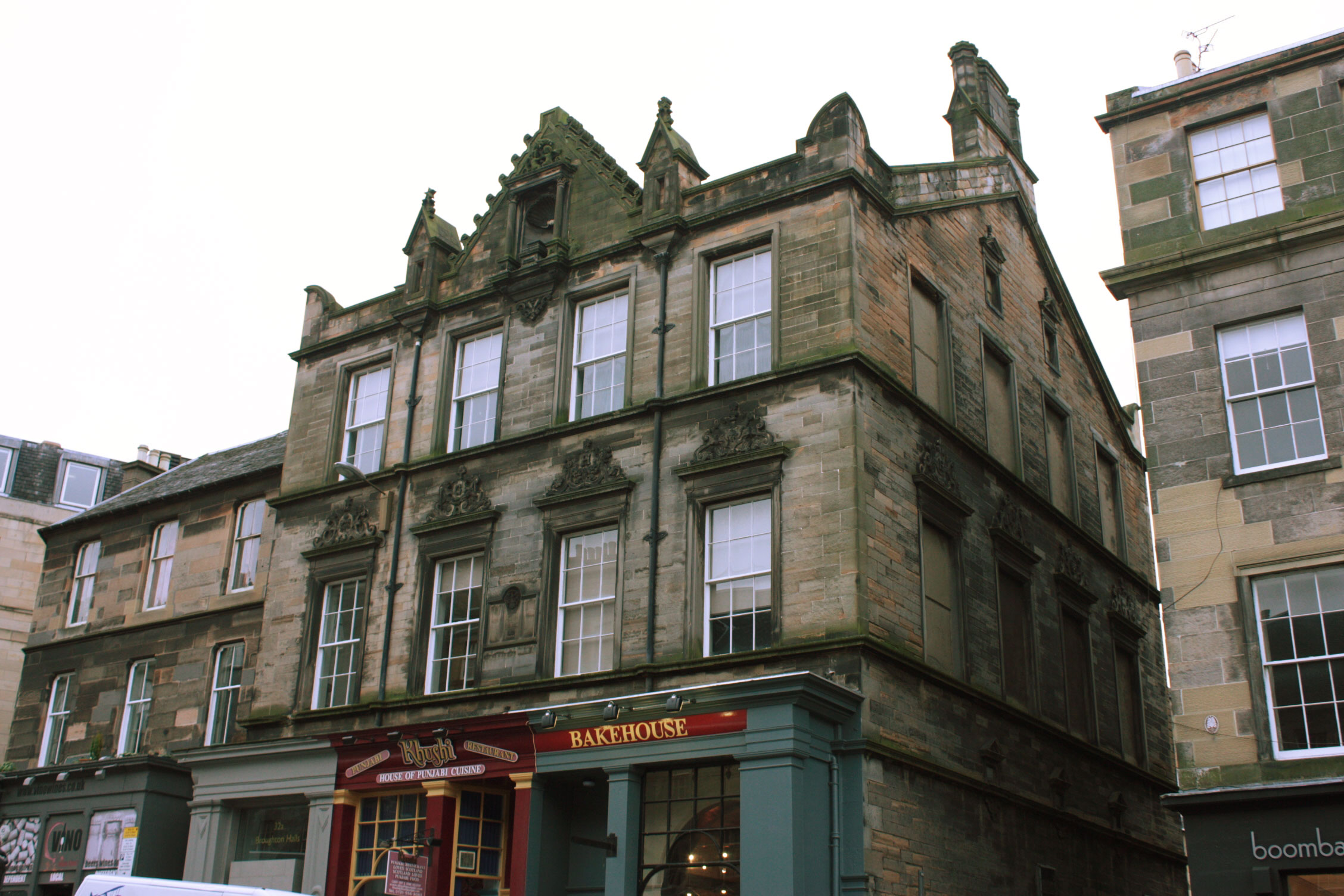
Heriot's Trust School on Broughton Street

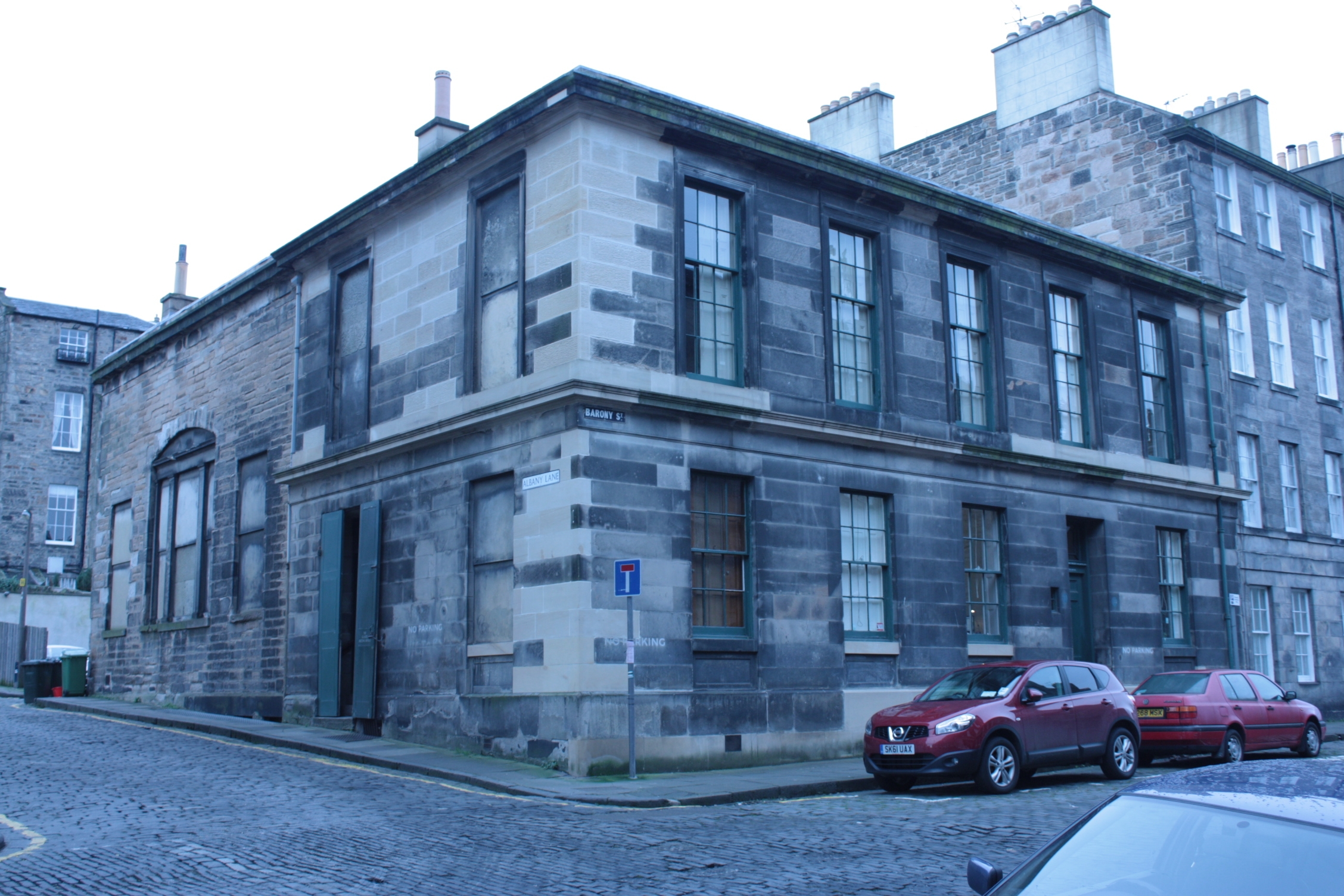
The Glasite Meeting House on Barony Street

- Refacing of George Heriot’s School in ashlar stonework (1833)
- Layout of roads between Stockbridge and Henderson Row (Saxe-Coburg Place, Clarence St etc.) (1834)
- Glasite Meeting House, Barony Street (1835) (from 1991 to 2012 the base of the Architectural Heritage Society of Scotland)
- George Heriot's Primary School (now the Science Block) (1838)
- Trust School at Old Assembly Close (1839)
- Trust School at Rose Street (1840)
- Trust School at Brown’s Square (1840)
- Trust School at Borthwick's Close (1840)
- Trust School at Cowgate/Pleasance (1840) (now a Salvation Army hostel)
- Masterplan for the area between Leith Walk and Easter Road (1848)
- Feuing of Wester Coates (1850)
- Trust School at Broughton Street (1853)
- Remodelling of Bonnington House near Ratho (1858)
- Tenements on Barony Street (works completed by William Notman in 1859)
