= George Meikle Kemp =

Scottish architect of the Scott Monument (1795–1844)

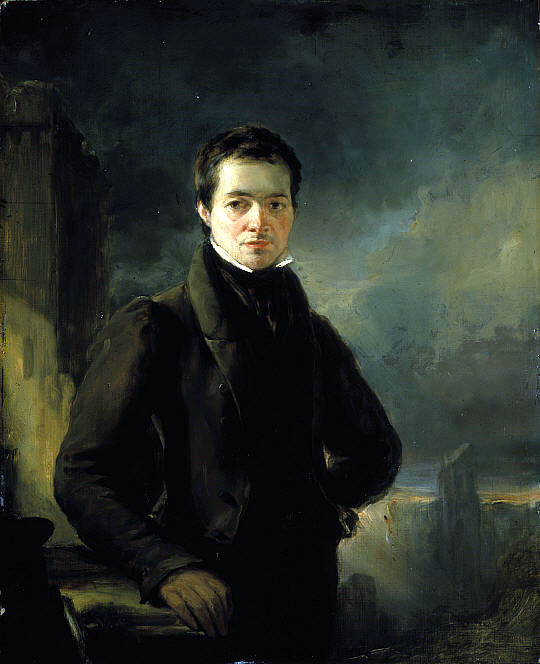
- Portrait of Kemp by William Bonnar c1840
- Born: 26 May 1795; Biggar, Lanarkshire, Scotland
- Died: 6 March 1844 (aged 48); Edinburgh, Scotland
- Burial place: Edinburgh, Scotland
- Occupations: Carpenter; joiner; draughtsman; architect
- Years active: 1813—1844
- Known for: The Scott Monument, Edinburgh
- Spouse: Elizabeth Wilson Bonnar

George Meikle Kemp (26 May 1795 — 6 March 1844) was a self-taught Scottish architect who designed and built the Scott Monument in Edinburgh, Scotland. The poorly educated son of a shepherd, showing talents in woodworking as a child, he was apprenticed to a joiner and millwright.

Kemp travelled and worked as a millwright for several years and, exercising a childhood fascination for Gothic architecture, took the opportunity to study many of the most important Gothic buildings in Scotland, England and France. As a result, he was said to have had a first-hand knowledge of Gothic architecture which was unrivalled in Scotland.

Settling in Edinburgh, Kemp won a competition to design a monument to the Scottish novelist Sir Walter Scott. He supervised its erection on Princes Street in the city but at the age of 48, before the building was finished, he drowned in the city's Union Canal. On its completion the monument was acclaimed and, despite his lack of formal training and with only the one building known to be for certain to his design, Kemp came to be revered as an architect.

== Childhood and education ==
George Meikle Kemp was the second of six children of James Kemp, a shepherd, and his wife Jean Mowbray. He was born on 25 May 1795 at Hillriggs Farm above the town of Biggar in Lanarkshire. (Note: There has been controversy over Kemp's place of birth since his first biographer, Thomas Bonnar, wrote in 1892 that Kemp was born at Moorfoot in Midlothian. In the mid-1980s, the Biggar Museum Trust established that Kemp was born at Hillriggs rather than at Moorfoot. In rewriting its entry for Kemp in 2004, the Oxford Dictionary of National Biography stated that Kemp was born at Hillriggs.) When Kemp was a child his father moved from farm to farm, wherever he could find work. The family were frequently on poor relief. Kemp was known to have lived at Newlanddale from just after his birth, moving to Ingraston in 1802 and Nine Mile Burn in 1805 before his father settled at Moorfoot, southeast of Penicuik, in 1807 when Kemp was 12.

Kemp's education, at parochial schools, was brief before he became a herdboy at the age of 11. At around this age, while on an errand, he visited the 15th century Rosslyn Chapel. The building awakened in Kemp an almost fanatical appreciation of Gothic architecture.

Kemp's artistic talents had already shown themselves in his childhood when he learned to carve local bog oak into trinkets and quaichs finished with intricate ornament. He also built miniature watermills in the hillside burns. His parents recognised his talents and they realised that he would benefit from proper training.

At the age of 14 Kemp was enrolled as an apprentice joiner with millwright and carpenter Andrew Noble at Moy Hall, Redscarhead, north of Peebles. He stayed there for four years, receiving a wide education. When at Moy Hall he repaired agricultural machinery and saw foundations laid and buildings erected. He taught himself to be a highly-skilled wood modeller. He also read ancient literature, wrote poetry and songs and played the violin.

Kemp developed a life-long habit of walking long distances. On Saturday nights he would walk for four hours from Redscarhead to visit his parents at Moorfoot, walking back late on Sundays. In adulthood he sometimes walked enormous distances so as to find work or study medieval architecture.

== Early career ==
Kemp's apprenticeship was completed on 20 June 1813 when he was 18. He started work as a millwright in Galashiels. His job entailed not just the upkeep of mills but also the repair of the various wooden agricultural and industrial machines being invented at this time. His expertise in this work and his willingness to labour as a journeyman was to provide his sometimes meagre income for the next 14 years.

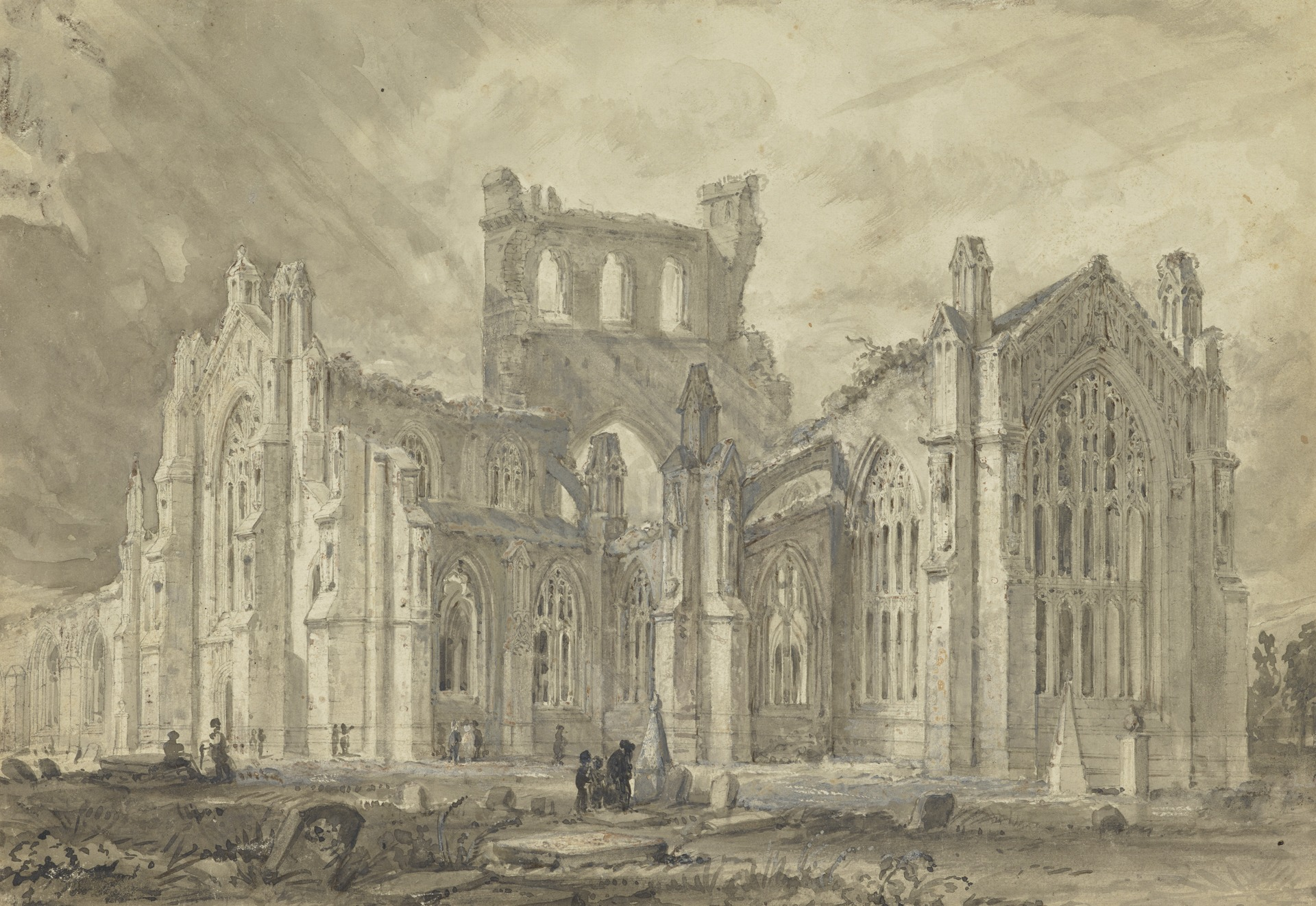
Melrose Abbey, Roxburghshire, drawn by George Meikle Kemp, c1830

At the same time Kemp began an intense study of Gothic architecture. His job required much local travel and he sketched and studied the monastic churches of the area, such as Melrose, Dryburgh, Jedburgh and Kelso. The abbey at Melrose was of great and lasting significance to Kemp; he returned to it repeatedly, and it became his most important inspiration for the Scott Monument. Kemp's method of looking at the architecture of a building was first to make a general study of it, then to carry out a few detailed sketches of decorative features. He did not draw plans there and then, but did so later, being able quickly to commit to memory the layout of a building and its intricacies.

In 1815 Kemp moved to John Cousin's building and joining workshop in Leith where he worked on the many new buildings in Edinburgh and learned the practicalities of converting architectural drawings into three-dimensional structures. In 1817 Kemp went to Manchester for three years, where he repaired machinery in the mills. He studied all the Gothic architecture he could find in the area, even walking for 24 hours to York in order to view the Minster. Kemp moved to Glasgow in 1820 and worked there for another four years while attending evening classes at Anderson's Institution, probably studying practical subjects like draughtsmanship, geometry and science. While in Glasgow he made a detailed study of Glasgow Cathedral and suggested restorations and additions.

In May 1824 Kemp went to London, but he failed to find permanent work there and disliked the city, so he stayed only a little over a year. From London, Kemp made for France in 1825, where he visited and studied more gothic buildings, including the great cathedrals and churches of Abbeville, Beauvais, Amiens, Paris and—in Belgium—Antwerp. At this time Kemp considered emigrating to Canada, but he instead returned to Scotland in 1827 because of the commercial embarrassments of a near relative. (Note: Not as reported by Kemp's first biographer, Thomas Bonnar, because of the death of his mother; she had died some ten years previously. The near relative is thought to have been Kemp's elder brother, Thomas Kemp (1792-1841), Clerk of Works to the Duke of Buccleuch.)

== Edinburgh ==
Kemp returned to Edinburgh in 1827 and never left Scotland again. He married Elizabeth Wilson Bonnar (1808-1889) on 11 September 1832. They had four children: two boys and two girls.

Kemp now had a knowledge of Gothic architecture unrivalled in Scotland, and in England surpassed by only three other men. (Note: John Chessell Buckler, Edward Blore and Thomas Rickman.) He had ambitions to become an architect, but he had not received specific training, and much of the architectural establishment was opposed to him. He became a Freemason, but the move failed to improve his prospects. While he had produced detailed, but uncommissioned, designs for the theoretical reconstructions of Glasgow Cathedral, Rosslyn Chapel, Trinity College Kirk and Melrose Abbey, he had never designed a new building.

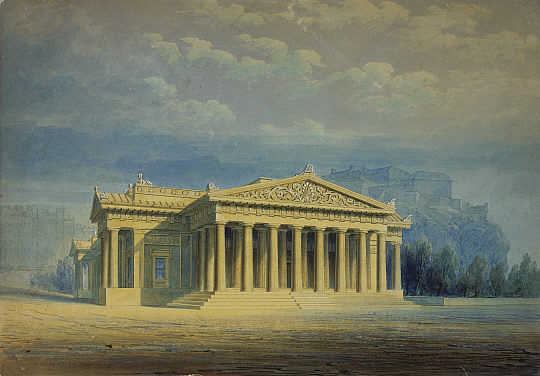
The Royal Institution, Edinburgh, drawn by Kemp, 1837–1839

In order to support himself and his wife and children Kemp became a cabinet-maker, but though he made impressively-crafted furniture he was largely unsuccessful. He was skilled at draughtsmanship, and drawings he made of Melrose Abbey were exhibited in the Scottish Academy Exhibition of 1830 and helped to make his name as an architectural illustrator. He was well-paid when the pictures were sold, but they could not support him adequately in the long term.

Kemp's elder brother, Thomas, helped by securing a job for him with the architect William Burn on the Duke of Buccleuch's estate at Bowhill near Selkirk. Burn engaged Kemp as a competent draughtsman, entrusting him with drawings for the new Bowhill House, and in 1831 commissioning him to make a wooden architectural model of Burn's design for a new palace for Buccleuch at Dalkeith. It took Kemp two years to build the model.

By 1834 Kemp's ideas on the restoration of Glasgow Cathedral and his proposed additions to it had been developed still further. He had produced an ambitious set of drawings of plans and elevations and had even built a large wooden model of the cathedral to illustrate his proposals. A local Glasgow committee took up the ideas, but Kemp's lack of practical experience as an architect went against him and the scheme failed to go ahead.

Some commentators have argued that Kemp was not wholly inexperienced as an architect, claiming that he designed and built the West Parish Church at Maybole in Ayrshire in 1836. But evidence is lacking and those who doubt Kemp's involvement claim the building's design lacks the Gothic inspiration that Kemp would have brought to it.

== The Scott Monument ==
In 1836 a competition was launched to design a monument to the Scottish author Sir Walter Scott, who had died in 1832, to be erected in Edinburgh. Several architects had already been invited to submit designs, but none was considered adequate. The competition's three best designs would each receive a prize of 50 guineas (equivalent to £5,234 in 2025).

Kemp recognised his opportunity and after working at great speed for five days submitted an entry, using the pseudonym John Morvo, one spelling of the name of the French master mason who had worked on the building of Melrose Abbey and Rosslyn Chapel. Kemp's design was described by his first biographer, Thomas Bonnar, as “a lofty tower or spire of beautiful proportions, with elaborate and carefully drawn details, chiefly taken from Melrose Abbey”.

There were 54 entries in the competition and John Morvo was one of the three winners. It was not known who John Morvo was, but Kemp's identity was eventually discovered and he was awarded one of the prizes. However, many of the competitors were aggrieved that someone unqualified, inexperienced and obscure, and not even an architect, was one of the winners.

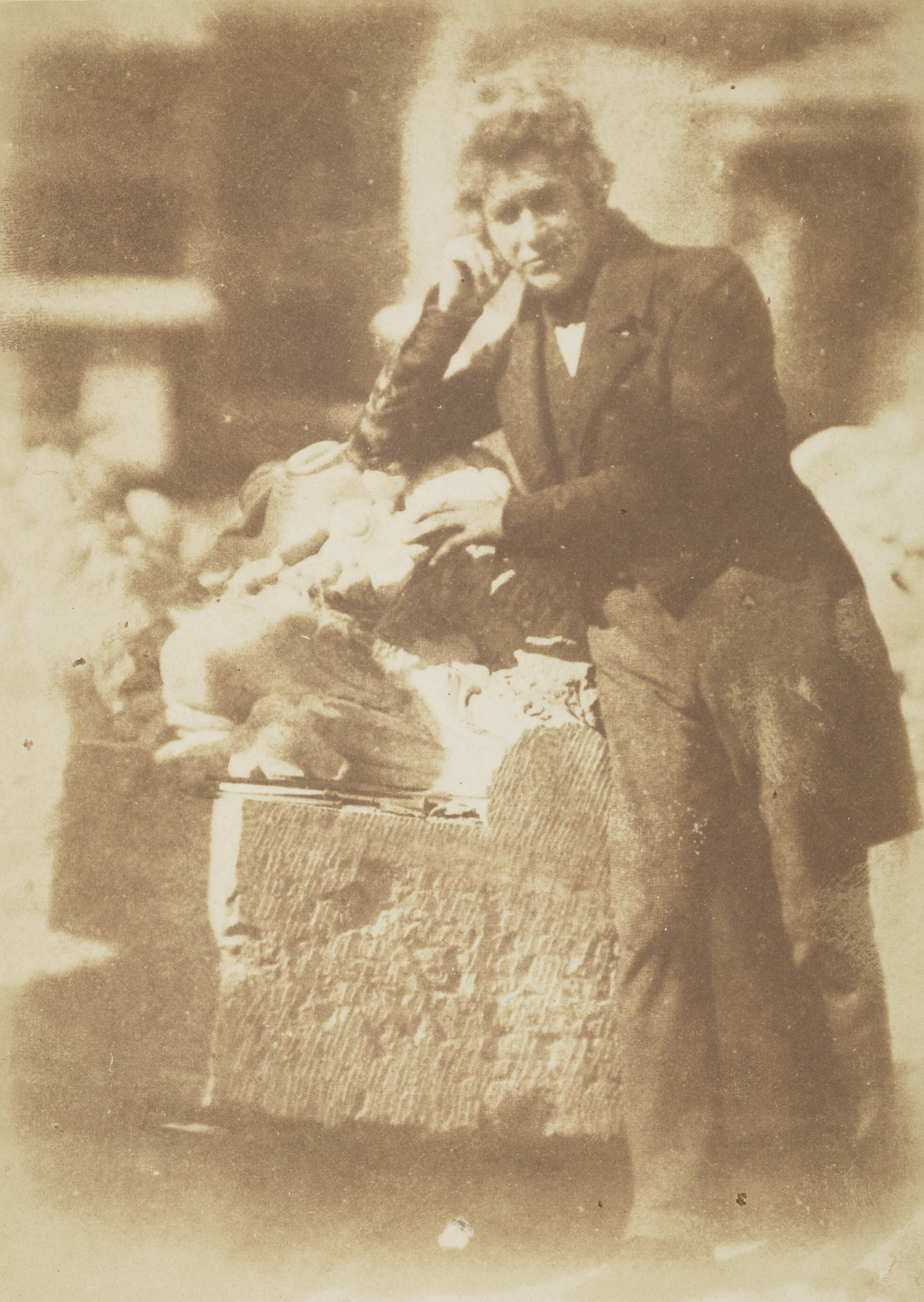
Kemp on the building site of the Scott Monument, photographed c. 1843 by David Octavius Hill and Robert Adamson

Unable to decide amongst the three winners, the competition committee invited further designs. Kemp submitted an improved version of his design under his own name and on 28 March 1838 he was announced as the winner. The organisers praised the "imposing structure ... of beautiful proportions, and in strict conformity with the purity of taste and style of Melrose Abbey, from which the author states it is in all its details derived”.

The site on Princes Street in Edinburgh was agreed. Kemp's approved builder was chosen, and it was decided that the monument was to be built of Binny sandstone. This stone was popular in Edinburgh because it was easily worked and could be transported into the city by the Union Canal, but hindsight has shown it be a poor choice because of its propensity for attracting soot.

Kemp took over as his own clerk of works, which gave him a regular income and the opportunity to supervise closely the building of his design. He was well liked by the craftsmen working for him, because of his humble origins and because he demanded accuracy and precision. In an early instance of his determination that the monument should be built in his own way, he rejected a proposal that wooden piles be driven into the ground to support the structure, insisting the excavation for the foundation should be carried down to the bedrock, 52 feet (16 metres) below the surface of Princes Street. However, Kemp at first lost an argument about the height of the monument; the organising committee blamed insufficient funds for their order to build it lower than originally planned, but Kemp eventually persuaded them to keep the structure's original height and in the end even slightly higher.

The foundation stone was laid on 15 August 1840, the 69th anniversary of Scott's birth, the day being especially declared a public holiday. Tens of thousands of people were present at the ceremony and Kemp was prominent among those being celebrated. As work progressed over the next four years, Kemp's presence on the building site, visible daily to passers-by on Princes Street, probably contributed to his growing public popularity. With the public interest in the Scott Monument, Kemp was now admired by the moneyed and influential classes in Edinburgh, and several potentially lucrative architectural commissions came his way.

In the early months of 1844 the monument was nearing completion. It was reported that as each step of the building was completed “the public eye detected some new beauty, and waited impatiently for the completion”. As the monument became a startlingly dramatic presence on Princes Street Kemp was being increasingly fêted.

== Death ==
During the evening of Wednesday 6 March 1844, while walking on his way home from a meeting with his builder, Kemp drowned in the Union Canal. His body was found the following Monday.

The circumstances of Kemp's death have not been explained. Suicide was discounted. Other theories such as drunkenness, an attack by robbers or in fog losing his footing on the towpath were considered, but the cause of his drowning has never been resolved.

Kemp's death brought an outpouring of public grief. Huge crowds came to observe the funeral procession. The workmen who had laboured with him in the building of the monument carried his coffin from his home in Morningside to St Cuthbert's churchyard below Edinburgh Castle, where he was buried.

Kemp died intestate, leaving assets of around £203 (equivalent to £22,300 in 2025), some furniture, and the model of Glasgow Cathedral, which proved unsaleable. A memorial concert to support the Kemp family was held and the Freemasons contributed, but Kemp's wife, Elisabeth, was left with little to live on and had to take work as a seamstress.

== Legacy ==
After Kemp's death, the construction of the monument continued, under the supervision of his brother-in-law, William Bonnar. It was made more elegant when the height was increased to 200 feet 6 inches (61.11 metres). It was completed in the autumn of 1844, with Kemp's 10-year-old son, Thomas, placing the topmost stone. Vast crowds attended the inauguration ceremony in 1846. Since then the Monument has become an icon of Edinburgh and indeed of Scotland, though an early critic was the author Charles Dickens who, in 1847, wrote: "I am sorry to report the Scott Monument a failure. It is like the spire of a Gothic church taken off and stuck in the ground". Similar denigrators were few and the building was, and still is, almost universally admired.

The Biographical Dictionary of Eminent Scotsmen sang the Monument's praises some 30 years after its completion:

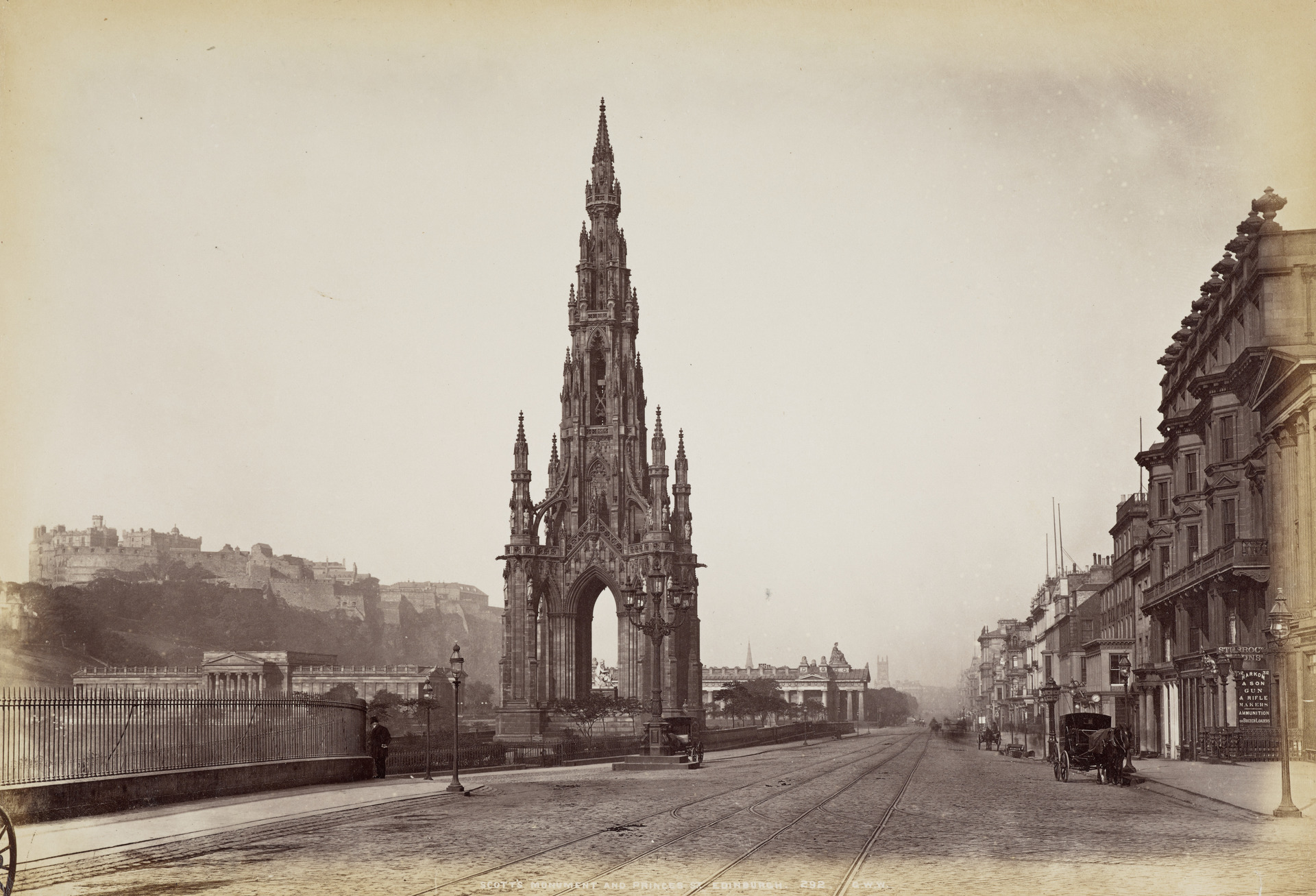
The Scott Monument on Princes Street, Edinburgh, photographed by George Washington Wilson

The Scott Monument has been visited from every land; engravings of it are diffused over the wide earth; and as long as it stands in its majestic and imposing beauty, the pilgrims of future centuries, who gaze upon it in silent admiration, will connect the name of its builder with the thought of him who it commemorates.

35,000–45,000 people a year visit it; roughly the same figure as have visited it every year since it was inaugurated: over seven million people in total. It has, as The Biographical Dictionary of Eminent Scotsmen predicted, almost eclipsed the reputation of Sir Walter Scott himself. Few people are thought to visit the Monument now because it is a memorial to the author. The huge majority of visitors do so because it, and its architect, are themselves famous. Kemp is revered in Scotland and within the great Scottish diaspora around the world.

The Scott Monument is the only confirmed completed building designed by Kemp. The West Parish Church at Maybole in Ayrshire is unlikely to be his work, and Millburn Church at Renton in Dunbartonshire (now ruined), which was for several years speculatively said to be Kemp's design, is now believed to have been designed by John Thomas Rochead. Reliably attributed to Kemp was a south wing added to the 1700s New Woodhouselee House in Glencorse, Midlothian in 1843 but the whole house was demolished in 1965. Stables attached to the house, built at around the same time, are tentatively attributed to Kemp. They are still standing, listed Category B, and may, with the Scott Monument, be the only other surviving Kemp building.

=== Memorials ===
In 1932 a memorial to Kemp, designed by James Grieve, was unveiled at Moy Hall, Redscarhead where Kemp served his apprenticeship. It is a single-storey Gothic gable added to the L-plan former workshop of Andrew Noble, joiner and millwright, who was Kemp's apprentice master.

Another Kemp memorial was installed by the Biggar Museum Trust on the 200th anniversary of his birth in 1995. It is of rough-hewn stone, bearing a bronze plaque, and stands just across the valley from where the Kemp cottage stood in 1795.

=== Kemp likenesses ===
Kemp's brother-in-law, William Bonnar, painted at least two portraits of him. One, with the half-built Monument seen behind Kemp, is in the possession of the Scottish National Portrait Gallery. The second portrait by Bonnar is owned by the City of Edinburgh Council. A portrait by an unknown artist of Kemp holding a model of the Scott Monument also belongs to the City of Edinburgh Council. Three sculpted representations of Kemp exist: a bust modelled from life by Alexander Handyside Ritchie and carved in marble by John Hutchison, is in the care of the City of Edinburgh Council; a profile, also by Ritchie, adorns Kemp's tombstone in St Cuthbert's churchyard. A further profile by Ritchie, in bronze, forms the centrepiece of the Kemp memorial at Redscarhead. Two photographic portraits of Kemp, posed on the Scott Monument's building site, were made by Robert Adamson (1821-48) in 1843. Salted paper prints from paper negative images are preserved by the City of Edinburgh Council.

== Personal life ==
While being a man with many friends, and towards the end of his life very popular with the public, Kemp has been described as disablingly shy, socially awkward and cantankerous. His latest biographer, Morven Leese, writes that Kemp demonstrated “a huge level of self-belief and drive, combined with a very unusual personality”. She suggests that his social disabilities were perhaps engendered by his humble background and exacerbated by him being “high on the autistic spectrum”.

Despite the impressive attendance at the funeral, the large number of dignitaries who attended, and the obvious high esteem in which the architect was held, the Kemps were not wealthy. A journalist observed that “The poor deceased, though he had risen, after a long struggle, into celebrity, had not risen into affluence.” He also commented on the humble appearance of the Kemp's house in Morningside from which the funeral procession left.
