= William Bonnar =

British artist

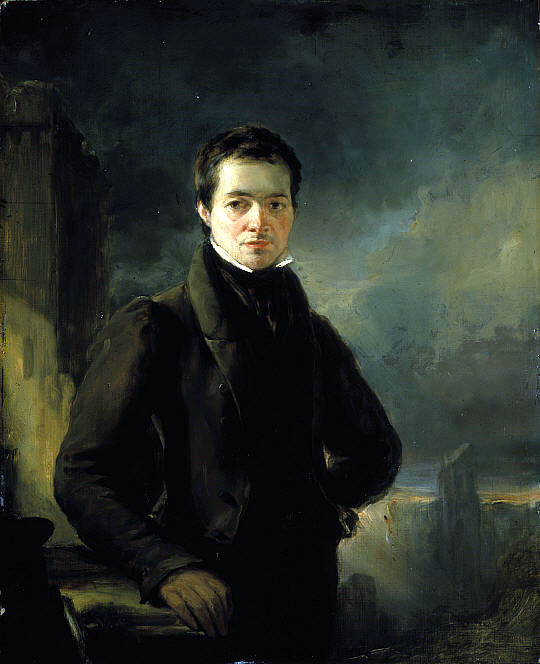
Portrait of George Meikle Kemp, 1840. Now at the National Gallery of Scotland.

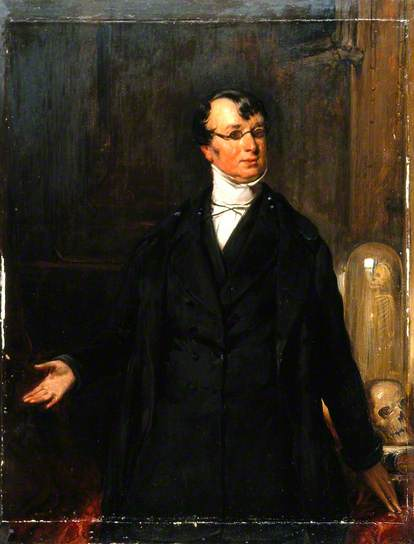
The surgeon Thomas Turner by William Bonnar

William Bonnar RSA (1800 – 27 January 1853) was a Scottish portrait painter.

== Life ==
Bonnar was born in Edinburgh in 1800. His father was Thomas Bonnar a house-painter and interior designer of considerable skill. Bonnar showed an early aptitude for drawing, and was apprenticed to one of the leading decorators of the time. When George IV visited Edinburgh in 1822, Bonnar assisted David Roberts in decorating the Assembly Rooms for the grand state ball which was given in honour of the occasion. Shortly afterwards some signboards painted by him attracted the notice of Captain Basil Hall, who sought out and encouraged the young artist. In the year 1824 his picture of 'The Tinkers ' established him as a favourite with the public, and shortly after the formation of the Royal Scottish Academy in 1830 he was elected one of its members.

In 1833 his address is given as Robb's Court, off the Canongate but by 1840 he was living at 113 Princes Street in a house looking over Princes Street Gardens to Edinburgh Castle.

Bonnar died at Edinburgh in 1853 and is buried in St Cuthbert's Kirkyard in Edinburgh. His monument is almost identical to that of his father in Dean Cemetery who had died only a few years earlier, and is therefore presumed to be by David Watson Stevenson. Both his sister Elizabeth and his daughter Elizabeth are buried elsewhere in the graveyard, both in the Kemp grave. William's sister, Elizabeth Bonnar (1808-1889) married George Meikle Kemp. He named his daughter Elizabeth (1826-1879) after his sister.

He left behind him many fine pictures, several of which were engraved by his younger brother, Thomas Bonnar (1810-1873).

Bonnar is often credited with overseeing the completion of the Scott Monument following the untimely death of his brother-in-law, George Meikle Kemp who had designed the monument and was overseeing its completion when he died in an accident. If true, William would be an odd choice, as one of the few non-architects in the family.

== Works ==
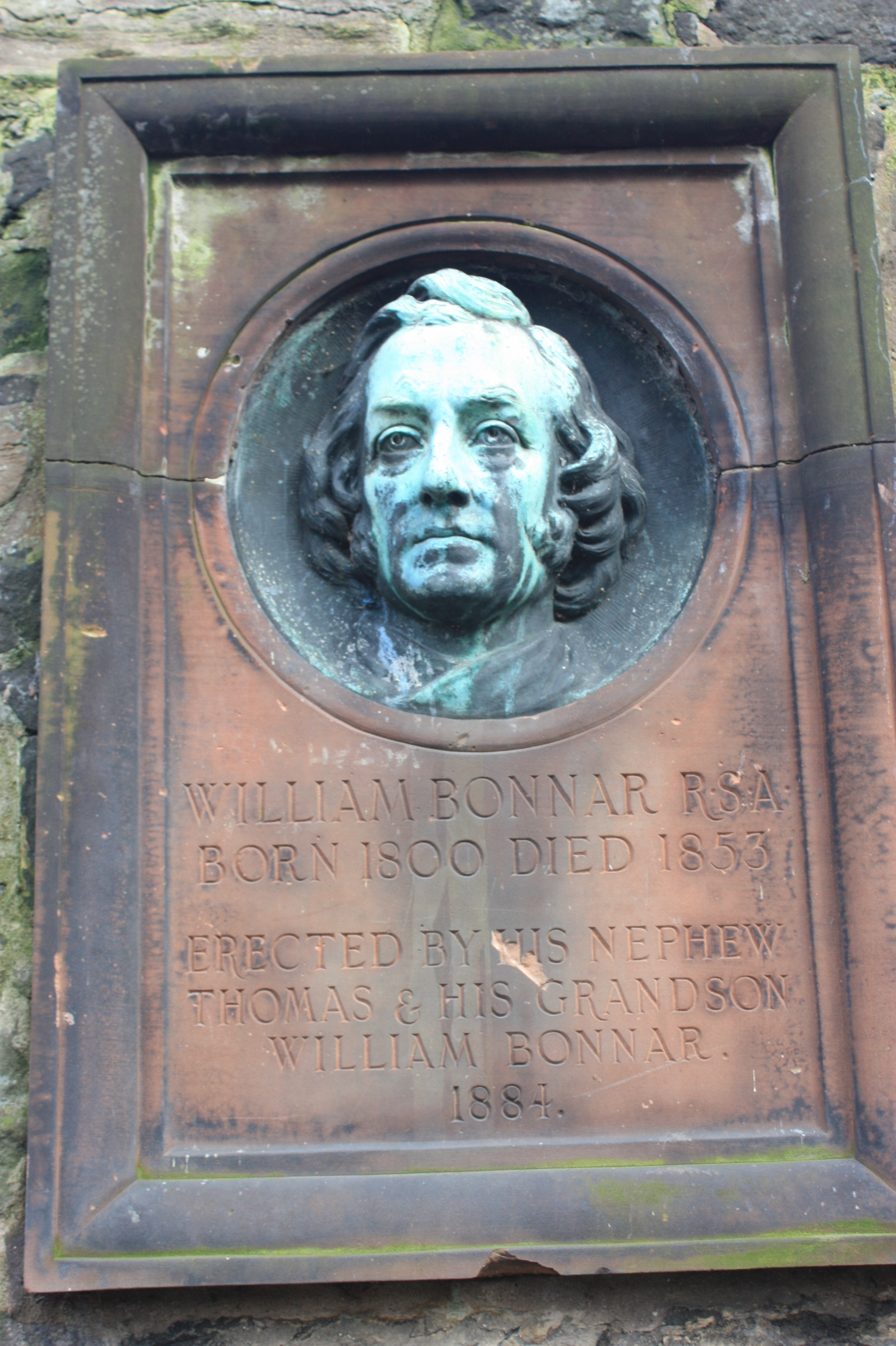
William Bonnar's grave, St Cuthberts, Edinburgh

Bonnar has several works within the National Gallery of Scotland.

- Reverend Dr Patrick Clason (1789-1867) of Buccleuch Church, National Gallery of Scotland
- Reverend William Cunningham (1805-1861), National Gallery of Scotland
- George Meikle Kemp (his brother-in-law), the architect of the Scott Monument, National Gallery of Scotland
- Self-portrait, National Gallery of Scotland
- Reverend Thomas Chalmers, two versions: National Gallery of Scotland and Angus Council
- Mrs Isabella Begg (1771-1858), Robert Burns' younger sister, National Gallery of Scotland
- George Johnston (naturalist) (1797-1855), National Gallery of Scotland
- "The Tinkers", National Gallery of Scotland
- John Caird (theologian) (1820-1898), painted in his youth, McLean Museum, Inverclyde
- Hugh Miller (1802-1856), Highland Council
- "A Scotch Toper", Perth and Kinross Council
- "Interior Scene, Woman with a Knife", University of Edinburgh Collection
