= James S. Barty =

Scottish minister

James Strachan Barty (26 June 1806 – 1 February 1875) was a Scottish minister and amateur botanist who served as Moderator of the General Assembly of the Church of Scotland in 1868/9.

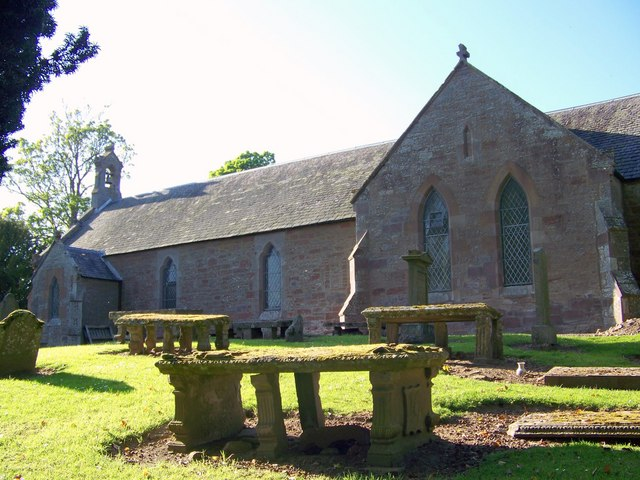
Bendochy Parish Kirk

== Life ==
Barty was born in the manse at Bendochy in Perthshire near Coupar Angus, the son of Thomas Barty (1758–1832), minister of the parish. He was educated at the University of St. Andrews.

In 1829 he was ordained assistant and successor to his father. On his father's death in 1832, he became the sole minister of Bendochy. In 1868 he succeeded Thomas Jackson Crawford as Moderator of the General Assembly. He was replaced in turn by Norman MacLeod (1812-1872) in 1869.

Barty was a noted amateur botanist. In October 1843, he produced the account of the parish of Bendochy, which included a substantial plant list, for the New Statistical Accounts of Scotland.

He was said to have been an eloquent and powerful preacher and debater who was a "a keen and valiant fighter on the side of the Moderates" during the debates leading to the Disruption of 1843. A proud Tory, he took part in public debates concerning agriculture, free trade, and education. He authored several pamphlets as well as a number of articles in Blackwood's Magazine and other publications. In 1844 he took part in a survey regarding the impact of the Poor Laws on his parish.

He died in the manse at Bendochy in late January 1875. He had lived in this house for his entire life.

== Family ==
On 19 April 1837, he married Margaret Webster (d. 28 April 1891), daughter of James Webster of Balruddery.

They had five children: Thomas (b. 1838), James Webster (1841-1915), Agnes Margaret (b. 1843), Jemima, and Elizabeth. James Webster Barty married Ann Moubray Boyd of Dunblane where he became a solictor. Thomas became minister of Kirkcolm.

== Publications ==
- "Bendochy, County of Perth". In The New Statistical Account of Scotland, Vol. 10 (Edinburgh, 1845), pp. 1176–1204. The Statistical Accounts of Scotland online: https://stataccscot.ed.ac.uk:443/link/nsa-vol10-p1204-parish-perth-bendochy
- Peter Plough's Letters to the Right Hon. Lord Kinnaird on High Farming and Free Trade (Edinburgh, 1850)
- Remarks on the Parochial and Burgh Schoolmasters Act (Edinburgh, 1862)
- Address Delivered at Close of the General Assembly (Edinburgh, 1868)
